= Paucilactobacillus =

Scientific classification
- Domain: Bacteria
- Kingdom: Bacillati
- Phylum: Bacillota
- Class: Bacilli
- Order: Lactobacillales
- Family: Lactobacillaceae
- Genus: Paucilactobacillus; Zheng et al. 2020

Type species
- Paucilactobacillus vaccinostercus (Kozaki and Okada 1983) Zheng et al. 2020

Species
- Paucilactobacillus hokkaidonensis (Tohno et al. 2013) Zheng et al. 2020; Paucilactobacillus kaifaensis (Liu and Gu 2019) Zheng et al. 2020; Paucilactobacillus nenjiangensis (Gu et al. 2013) Zheng et al. 2020; Paucilactobacillus oligofermentans (Koort et al. 2005) Zheng et al. 2020; Paucilactobacillus suebicus (Kleynmans et al. 1989) Zheng et al. 2020; Paucilactobacillus vaccinostercus (Kozaki and Okada 1983) Zheng et al. 2020; Paucilactobacillus wasatchensis (Oberg et al. 2016) Zheng et al. 2020

Genus of bacteria

Paucilactobacillus is a genus of lactic acid bacteria.

== Phylogeny ==
The currently accepted taxonomy is based on the List of Prokaryotic names with Standing in Nomenclature and the phylogeny is based on whole-genome sequences.

- - Paucilactobacillus
    - - - - Paucilactobacillus kaifaensis
          - Paucilactobacillus wasatchensis
        - Paucilactobacillus hokkaidonensis
      - - Paucilactobacillus suebicus
        - Paucilactobacillus vaccinostercus
    - - Paucilactobacillus nenjiangensis
      - Paucilactobacillus oligofermentans
  - outgroup
    Holzapfelia
