= Lacticaseibacillus =

Scientific classification
- Domain: Bacteria
- Kingdom: Bacillati
- Phylum: Bacillota
- Class: Bacilli
- Order: Lactobacillales
- Family: Lactobacillaceae
- Genus: Lacticaseibacillus; Zheng et al. 2020

Type species
- Lacticaseibacillus casei (Orla-Jensen 1916) Zheng et al. 2020

Species
- See text.

Synonyms
- "Caseobacterium" Orla-Jensen 1916

Genus of bacteria

Lacticaseibacillus is a genus of lactic acid bacteria.

== Species ==
The genus Lacticaseibacillus comprises the following species:

- Lacticaseibacillus absianus Bai et al. 2021
- Lacticaseibacillus baoqingensis (Long and Gu 2019) Zheng et al. 2020
- Lacticaseibacillus brantae (Volokhov et al. 2012) Zheng et al. 2020
- Lacticaseibacillus camelliae (Tanasupawat et al. 2007) Zheng et al. 2020
- Lacticaseibacillus casei (Orla-Jensen 1916) Zheng et al. 2020
- Lacticaseibacillus chiayiensis (Huang et al. 2018) Zheng et al. 2020
- Lacticaseibacillus daqingensis (Long et al. 2020) Zheng et al. 2020
- Lacticaseibacillus hegangensis (Long et al. 2020) Zheng et al. 2020
- Lacticaseibacillus hulanensis (Zhao and Gu 2019) Zheng et al. 2020
- Lacticaseibacillus jixianensis (Long and Gu 2019) Zheng et al. 2020
- Lacticaseibacillus manihotivorans (Morlon-Guyot et al. 1998) Zheng et al. 2020
- Lacticaseibacillus nasuensis (Cai et al. 2012) Zheng et al. 2020
- Lacticaseibacillus pantheris (Liu and Dong 2002) Zheng et al. 2020
- Lacticaseibacillus paracasei (Collins et al. 1989) Zheng et al. 2020
- Lacticaseibacillus porcinae (Nguyen et al. 2013) Zheng et al. 2020
- Lacticaseibacillus rhamnosus (Hansen 1968) Zheng et al. 2020
- Lacticaseibacillus saniviri (Oki et al. 2012) Zheng et al. 2020
- Lacticaseibacillus sharpeae (Weiss et al. 1982) Zheng et al. 2020
- Lacticaseibacillus songhuajiangensis (Gu et al. 2013) Zheng et al. 2020
- Lactobacillus suibinensis (Long et al. 2020) Zheng et al. 2020
- Lacticaseibacillus thailandensis (Tanasupawat et al. 2007) Zheng et al. 2020
- Lacticaseibacillus yichunensis (Long et al. 2020) Zheng et al. 2020
- Lacticaseibacillus zeae (Dicks et al. 1996) Liu and Gu 2020
- Lacticaseibacillus zhaodongensis (Li et al. 2020) Liu and Gu 2020

== Phylogeny ==
The currently accepted taxonomy is based on the List of Prokaryotic names with Standing in Nomenclature and the phylogeny is based on whole-genome sequences.

- - Lacticaseibacillus
    - - - - - - - Lacticaseibacillus manihotivorans
                - Lacticaseibacillus porcinae
              - Lacticaseibacillus baoqingensis
            - Lacticaseibacillus nasuensis
          - - Lacticaseibacillus camelliae
            - Lacticaseibacillus jixianensis
        - - - Lacticaseibacillus pantheris
            - Lacticaseibacillus thailandensis
          - - Lacticaseibacillus songhuajiangensis
            - - Lacticaseibacillus hulanensis
              - Lacticaseibacillus sharpeae
      - - Lacticaseibacillus brantae
        - Lacticaseibacillus saniviri
    - - Lacticaseibacillus rhamnosus
      - - Lacticaseibacillus paracasei
        - - Lacticaseibacillus casei
          - Lacticaseibacillus chiayiensis
  - outgroup
    Holzapfelia
