= Fructilactobacillus =

Scientific classification
- Domain: Bacteria
- Kingdom: Bacillati
- Phylum: Bacillota
- Class: Bacilli
- Order: Lactobacillales
- Family: Lactobacillaceae
- Genus: Fructilactobacillus; Zheng et al. 2020

Type species
- Fructilactobacillus fructivorans (Charlton et al. 1934) Zheng et al. 2020

Species
- Fructilactobacillus florum (Endo et al. 2010) Zheng et al. 2020; Fructilactobacillus fructivorans (Charlton et al. 1934) Zheng et al. 2020; Fructilactobacillus ixorae (Techo et al. 2016) Zheng et al. 2020; Fructilactobacillus lindneri (Back et al. 1997) Zheng et al. 2020; Fructilactobacillus sanfranciscensis (Weiss and Schillinger 1984) Zheng et al. 2020; Fructilactobacillus vespulae (Hoang et al. 2015) Zheng et al. 2020

Genus of bacteria

Fructilactobacillus is a genus of lactic acid bacteria.

== Phylogeny ==
The current taxonomy is based on the List of Prokaryotic names with Standing in Nomenclature and the phylogeny is based on whole-genome sequences.

- - Fructilactobacillus
    - - - - Fructilactobacillus florum
          - Fructilactobacillus ixorae
        - Fructilactobacillus lindneri
      - - Fructilactobacillus sanfranciscensis
        - Fructilactobacillus vespulae
    - Fructilactobacillus fructivorans
  - outgroup
    Holzapfelia
