= Bombilactobacillus =

Scientific classification
- Domain: Bacteria
- Kingdom: Bacillati
- Phylum: Bacillota
- Class: Bacilli
- Order: Lactobacillales
- Family: Lactobacillaceae
- Genus: Bombilactobacillus; Zheng et al. 2020

Type species
- Bombilactobacillus mellifer (Olofsson et al. 2014) Zheng et al. 2020

Species
- "Bombilactobacillus apium" Kang et al. 2021; Bombilactobacillus bombi (Killer et al. 2014) Zheng et al 2020; Bombilactobacillus mellifer (Olofsson et al. 2014) Zheng et al. 2020; Bombilactobacillus mellis (Olofsson et al. 2014) Zheng et al. 2020

Genus of bacteria

Bombilactobacillus is a genus of lactic acid bacteria.

== Phylogeny ==
The currently accepted taxonomy is based on the List of Prokaryotic names with Standing in Nomenclature and the phylogeny is based on whole-genome sequences.

- - Bombilactobacillus
    - - Bombilactobacillus bombi
      - Bombilactobacillus mellis
    - Bombilactobacillus mellifer
  - outgroup
    Holzapfelia
