= Liquorilactobacillus =

Scientific classification
- Domain: Bacteria
- Kingdom: Bacillati
- Phylum: Bacillota
- Class: Bacilli
- Order: Lactobacillales
- Family: Lactobacillaceae
- Genus: Liquorilactobacillus; Zheng et al. 2020

Type species
- Liquorilactobacillus mali (Carr and Davies 1970) Zheng et al. 2020

Species
- See text.

Genus of bacteria

Liquorilactobacillus is a genus of lactic acid bacteria.

== Species ==
The genus comprises the following species:

- Liquorilactobacillus aquaticus (Mañes-Lázaro et al. 2009) Zheng et al. 2020
- Liquorilactobacillus cacaonum (De Bruyne et al. 2009) Zheng et al. 2020
- Liquorilactobacillus capillatus (Chao et al. 2008) Zheng et al. 2020
- Liquorilactobacillus ghanensis (Nielsen et al. 2007) Zheng et al. 2020
- Liquorilactobacillus hordei (Rouse et al. 2008) Zheng et al. 2020
- Liquorilactobacillus mali (Carr and Davies 1970) Zheng et al. 2020
- Liquorilactobacillus nagelii (Edwards et al. 2000) Zheng et al. 2020
- Liquorilactobacillus oeni (Mañes-Lázaro et al. 2009) Zheng et al. 2020
- Liquorilactobacillus satsumensis (Endo and Okada 2005) Zheng et al. 2020
- Liquorilactobacillus sicerae (Puertas et al. 2014) Zheng et al. 2020
- Liquorilactobacillus sucicola (Irisawa and Okada 2009) Zheng et al. 2020
- Liquorilactobacillus uvarum (Mañes-Lázaro et al. 2009) Zheng et al. 2020
- Liquorilactobacillus vini (Rodas et al. 2006) Zheng et al. 2020

== Phylogeny ==
The currently accepted taxonomy is based on the List of Prokaryotic names with Standing in Nomenclature and the phylogeny is based on whole-genome sequences.

- - Liquorilactobacillus
    - - - - - Liquorilactobacillus aquaticus
            - Liquorilactobacillus uvarum
          - Liquorilactobacillus sucicola
        - Liquorilactobacillus capillatus
      - - Liquorilactobacillus cacaonum
        - - Liquorilactobacillus hordei
          - Liquorilactobacillus mali
    - - - Liquorilactobacillus oeni
        - Liquorilactobacillus satsumensis
      - - - Liquorilactobacillus ghanensis
          - Liquorilactobacillus nagelii
        - - Liquorilactobacillus sicerae
          - Liquorilactobacillus vini
  - outgroup
    Holzapfelia
