= Latilactobacillus =

Scientific classification
- Domain: Bacteria
- Kingdom: Bacillati
- Phylum: Bacillota
- Class: Bacilli
- Order: Lactobacillales
- Family: Lactobacillaceae
- Genus: Latilactobacillus; Zheng et al. 2020

Type species
- Latilactobacillus sakei (Katagiri et al. 1934) Zheng et al. 2020

Species
- Latilactobacillus curvatus (Troili-Petersson 1903) Zheng et al. 2020; Latilactobacillus fuchuensis (Sakala et al. 2002) Zheng et al. 2020; Latilactobacillus graminis (Beck et al. 1989) Zheng et al. 2020; Latilactobacillus sakei (Katagiri et al. 1934) Zheng et al. 2020; Latilactobacillus fragifolii (Legein et al. 2022)

Genus of bacteria

Latilactobacillus is a genus of lactic acid bacteria.

== Phylogeny ==
The currently accepted taxonomy is based on the List of Prokaryotic names with Standing in Nomenclature and the phylogeny is based on whole-genome sequences.

- - Latilactobacillus
    - - - Latilactobacillus curvatus
        - Latilactobacillus sakei
      - Latilactobacillus graminis
    - Latilactobacillus fuchuensis
  - outgroup
    Holzapfelia
