= Lapidilactobacillus =

Scientific classification
- Domain: Bacteria
- Kingdom: Bacillati
- Phylum: Bacillota
- Class: Bacilli
- Order: Lactobacillales
- Family: Lactobacillaceae
- Genus: Lapidilactobacillus; Zheng et al. 2020

Type species
- Lapidilactobacillus concavus (Tong and Dong 2005) Zheng et al. 2020

Species
- Lapidilactobacillus achengensis (Long et al. 2020) Zheng et al. 2020; Lapidilactobacillus bayanensis (Wei and Gu 2019) Zheng et al. 2020; Lapidilactobacillus concavus (Tong and Dong 2005) Zheng et al. 2020; Lapidilactobacillus dextrinicus (Coster and White 1964) Zheng et al. 2020; Lapidilactobacillus gannanensis (Long et al. 2020) Zheng et al. 2020; Lapidilactobacillus mulanensis (Long et al. 2020) Zheng et al. 2020; Lapidilactobacillus wuchangensis (Long et al. 2020) Zheng et al. 2020

Genus of bacteria

Lapidilactobacillus is a genus of lactic acid bacteria.

== Phylogeny ==
The currently accepted taxonomy is based on the List of Prokaryotic names with Standing in Nomenclature and the phylogeny is based on whole-genome sequences.

- - Lapidilactobacillus
    - - Lapidilactobacillus bayanensis
      - Lapidilactobacillus dextrinicus
    - Lapidilactobacillus concavus
  - outgroup
    Holzapfelia
