= Companilactobacillus =

Scientific classification
- Domain: Bacteria
- Kingdom: Bacillati
- Phylum: Bacillota
- Class: Bacilli
- Order: Lactobacillales
- Family: Lactobacillaceae
- Genus: Companilactobacillus; Zheng et al. 2020

Type species
- Companilactobacillus alimentarius (Reuter 1983) Zheng et al. 2020

Species
- See text.

Genus of bacteria

Companilactobacillus is a genus of lactic acid bacteria.

== Species ==
The genus Companilactobacillus comprises the following species:

- Companilactobacillus alimentarius (Reuter 1983) Zheng et al. 2020
- Companilactobacillus allii (Jung et al. 2017) Zheng et al. 2020
- Companilactobacillus baiquanensis (Wei and Gu 2019) Zheng et al. 2020
- Companilactobacillus bobalius (Mañes-Lázaro et al. 2008) Zheng et al. 2020
- Companilactobacillus crustorum (Scheirlinck et al. 2007) Zheng et al. 2020
- Companilactobacillus farciminis (Reuter 1983) Zheng et al. 2020
- Companilactobacillus formosensis (Chang et al. 2015) Zheng et al. 2020
- Companilactobacillus furfuricola (Irisawa et al. 2014) Zheng et al. 2020
- Companilactobacillus futsaii (Chao et al. 2012) Zheng et al. 2020
- Companilactobacillus ginsenosidimutans Zheng et al. 2020
- Companilactobacillus halodurans Zheng et al. 2020
- Companilactobacillus heilongjiangensis (Gu et al. 2013) Zheng et al. 2020
- Companilactobacillus huachuanensis (Fu and Gu 2019) Zheng et al. 2020
- Companilactobacillus hulinensis (Wei and Gu 2019) Zheng et al. 2020
- Companilactobacillus insicii (Ehrmann et al. 2016) Zheng et al. 2020
- Companilactobacillus jidongensis (Wei and Gu 2019) Zheng et al. 2020
- Companilactobacillus kedongensis (Wei and Gu 2019) Zheng et al. 2020
- Companilactobacillus keshanensis (Wei and Gu 2019) Zheng et al. 2020
- Companilactobacillus kimchiensis (Kim et al. 2013) Zheng et al. 2020
- Companilactobacillus kimchii (Yoon et al. 2000) Zheng et al. 2020
- Companilactobacillus metriopterae (Chiba et al. 2018) Zheng et al. 2020
- Companilactobacillus mindensis (Ehrmann et al. 2003) Zheng et al. 2020
- Companilactobacillus mishanensis (Wei and Gu 2019) Zheng et al. 2020
- Companilactobacillus musae (Chen et al. 2017) Zheng et al. 2020
- Companilactobacillus nantensis (Valcheva et al. 2006) Zheng et al. 2020
- Companilactobacillus nodensis (Kashiwagi et al. 2009) Zheng et al. 2020
- Companilactobacillus nuruki (Heo et al. 2018) Zheng et al. 2020
- Companilactobacillus pabuli Jung et al. 2021
- Companilactobacillus paralimentarius (Cai et al. 1999) Zheng et al. 2020
- Companilactobacillus salsicarnum Zheng et al. 2020
- Companilactobacillus suantsaicola Zheng et al. 2020
- Companilactobacillus tucceti (Chenoll et al. 2009) Zheng et al. 2020
- Companilactobacillus versmoldensis (Kröckel et al. 2003) Zheng et al. 2020
- Companilactobacillus zhachilii (Zhang et al. 2019) Zheng et al. 2020
- Companilactobacillus zhongbaensis (Wei and Gu 2019) Zheng et al. 2020

== Phylogeny ==
The currently accepted taxonomy is based on the List of Prokaryotic names with Standing in Nomenclature and the phylogeny is based on whole-genome sequences.

- - Companilactobacillus
    - - - - - - - - - - - Companilactobacillus formosensis
                        - Companilactobacillus futsaii
                      - Companilactobacillus farciminis
                    - Companilactobacillus zhachilii
                  - - Companilactobacillus nuruki
                    - Companilactobacillus crustorum
                - - Companilactobacillus musae
                  - - Companilactobacillus nantensis
                    - - Companilactobacillus heilongjiangensis
                      - Companilactobacillus huachuanensis
              - Companilactobacillus mindensis
            - Companilactobacillus kimchiensis
          - - - Companilactobacillus alimentarius
              - Companilactobacillus halodurans
            - - Companilactobacillus suantsaicola
              - - Companilactobacillus bobalius
                - - Companilactobacillus paralimentarius
                  - Companilactobacillus kimchii
        - - Companilactobacillus versmoldensis
          - - Companilactobacillus zhongbaensis
            - Companilactobacillus furfuricola
      - - Companilactobacillus allii
        - - Companilactobacillus insicii
          - - - - Companilactobacillus salsicarnum
                - Companilactobacillus mishanensis
              - Companilactobacillus ginsenosidimutans
            - - - - Companilactobacillus jidongensis
                  - Companilactobacillus nodensis
                - Companilactobacillus hulinensis
              - - Companilactobacillus tucceti
                - - Companilactobacillus baiquanensis
                  - - Companilactobacillus kedongensis
                    - Companilactobacillus keshanensis
    - Companilactobacillus metriopterae
  - outgroup
    Holzapfelia
