= Levilactobacillus =

Scientific classification
- Domain: Bacteria
- Kingdom: Bacillati
- Phylum: Bacillota
- Class: Bacilli
- Order: Lactobacillales
- Family: Lactobacillaceae
- Genus: Levilactobacillus; Zheng et al. 2020

Type species
- Levilactobacillus brevis (Orla-Jensen 1919) Zheng et al. 2020

Species
- See text.

Synonyms
- "Betabacterium" Orla-Jensen 1919

Genus of bacteria

Levilactobacillus is a genus of lactic acid bacteria.

== Species ==
The genus Levilactobacillus comprises the following species:

- Levilactobacillus acidifarinae (Vancanneyt et al. 2005) Zheng et al. 2020
- Levilactobacillus angrenensis (Long et al. 2020) Zheng et al. 2020
- Levilactobacillus bambusae (Guu et al. 2018) Zheng et al. 2020
- Levilactobacillus brevis (Orla-Jensen 1919) Zheng et al. 2020
- Levilactobacillus cerevisiae (Koob et al. 2017) Zheng et al. 2020
- Levilactobacillus enshiensis (Zhang et al. 2020) Zheng et al. 2020
- Levilactobacillus fujinensis (Long and Gu 2019) Zheng et al. 2020
- Levilactobacillus fuyuanensis (Long and Gu 2019) Zheng et al. 2020
- Levilactobacillus hammesii (Valcheva et al. 2005) Zheng et al. 2020
- Levilactobacillus huananensis (Long and Gu 2019) Zheng et al. 2020
- Levilactobacillus koreensis (Bui et al. 2011) Zheng et al. 2020
- Levilactobacillus lindianensis (Long and Gu 2019) Zheng et al. 2020
- Levilactobacillus mulengensis (Long and Gu 2019) Zheng et al. 2020
- Levilactobacillus namurensis (Scheirlinck et al. 2007) Zheng et al. 2020
- Levilactobacillus parabrevis (Vancanneyt et al. 2006) Zheng et al. 2020
- Levilactobacillus paucivorans (Ehrmann et al. 2010) Zheng et al. 2020
- Levilactobacillus senmaizukei (Hiraga et al. 2008) Zheng et al. 2020
- Levilactobacillus spicheri (Meroth et al. 2004) Zheng et al. 2020
- Levilactobacillus suantsaii (Liou et al. 2019) Zheng et al. 2020
- Levilactobacillus suantsaiihabitans Zheng et al. 2020
- Levilactobacillus tangyuanensis (Long and Gu 2019) Zheng et al. 2020
- Levilactobacillus tongjiangensis (Long and Gu 2019) Zheng et al. 2020
- Levilactobacillus yonginensis (Yi et al. 2013) Zheng et al. 2020
- Levilactobacillus zymae (Vancanneyt et al. 2005) Zheng et al. 2020

== Phylogeny ==
The currently accepted taxonomy is based on the List of Prokaryotic names with Standing in Nomenclature and the phylogeny is based on whole-genome sequences.

- - Levilactobacillus
    - - - - - - - - - Levilactobacillus fujinensis
                    - Levilactobacillus koreensis
                  - - Levilactobacillus tongjiangensis
                    - Levilactobacillus yonginensis
                - - Levilactobacillus cerevisiae
                  - Levilactobacillus mulengensis
              - - Levilactobacillus huananensis
                - - Levilactobacillus lindianensis
                  - Levilactobacillus paucivorans
            - - Levilactobacillus fuyuanensis
              - - Levilactobacillus parabrevis
                - Levilactobacillus tangyuanensis
          - - Levilactobacillus hammesii
            - Levilactobacillus senmaizukei
        - - Levilactobacillus brevis
          - Levilactobacillus suantsaiihabitans
      - - Levilactobacillus spicheri
        - - - Levilactobacillus acidifarinae
            - Levilactobacillus zymae
          - - Levilactobacillus namurensis
            - Levilactobacillus suantsaii
    - Levilactobacillus bambusae
  - outgroup
    Holzapfelia
