= Loigolactobacillus =

Scientific classification
- Domain: Bacteria
- Kingdom: Bacillati
- Phylum: Bacillota
- Class: Bacilli
- Order: Lactobacillales
- Family: Lactobacillaceae
- Genus: Loigolactobacillus; Zheng et al. 2020

Type species
- Loigolactobacillus coryniformis (Abo-Elnaga and Kandler 1965) Zheng et al. 2020

Species
- Loigolactobacillus backii (Tohno et al. 2013) Zheng et al. 2020; Loigolactobacillus bifermentans (Kandler et al. 1983) Zheng et al. 2020; Loigolactobacillus binensis (Long et al. 2020) Zheng et al. 2020; Loigolactobacillus coryniformis (Abo-Elnaga and Kandler 1965) Zheng et al. 2020; Loigolactobacillus iwatensis (Tohno et al. 2013) Zheng et al. 2020; Loigolactobacillus jiayinensis (Long and Gu 2019) Zheng et al. 2020; Loigolactobacillus rennini (Chenoll et al. 2006) Zheng et al. 2020; Loigolactobacillus zhaoyuanensis (Long and Gu 2019) Zheng et al. 2020

Genus of bacteria

Loigolactobacillus is a genus of lactic acid bacteria.

== Phylogeny ==
The currently accepted taxonomy is based on the List of Prokaryotic names with Standing in Nomenclature and the phylogeny is based on whole-genome sequences.

- - Loigolactobacillus
    - - - - Loigolactobacillus backii
          - Loigolactobacillus iwatensis
        - Loigolactobacillus bifermentans
      - - Loigolactobacillus zhaoyuanensis
        - - Loigolactobacillus coryniformis
          - Loigolactobacillus jiayinensis
    - Loigolactobacillus rennini
  - outgroup
    Holzapfelia
