= Schleiferilactobacillus =

Scientific classification
- Domain: Bacteria
- Kingdom: Bacillati
- Phylum: Bacillota
- Class: Bacilli
- Order: Lactobacillales
- Family: Lactobacillaceae
- Genus: Schleiferilactobacillus; Zheng et al. 2020

Type species
- Schleiferilactobacillus perolens (Back et al. 2000) Zheng et al. 2020

Species
- Schleiferilactobacillus harbinensis (Miyamoto et al. 2006) Zheng et al. 2020; Schleiferilactobacillus perolens (Back et al. 2000) Zheng et al. 2020; Schleiferilactobacillus shenzhenensis (Zou et al. 2013) Zheng et al. 2020

Genus of bacteria

Schleiferilactobacillus is a genus of lactic acid bacteria.

== Phylogeny ==
The currently accepted taxonomy is based on the List of Prokaryotic names with Standing in Nomenclature and the phylogeny is based on whole-genome sequences.

- - Schleiferilactobacillus
    - - Schleiferilactobacillus harbinensis
      - Schleiferilactobacillus shenzhenensis
    - Schleiferilactobacillus perolens
  - outgroup
    Holzapfelia
