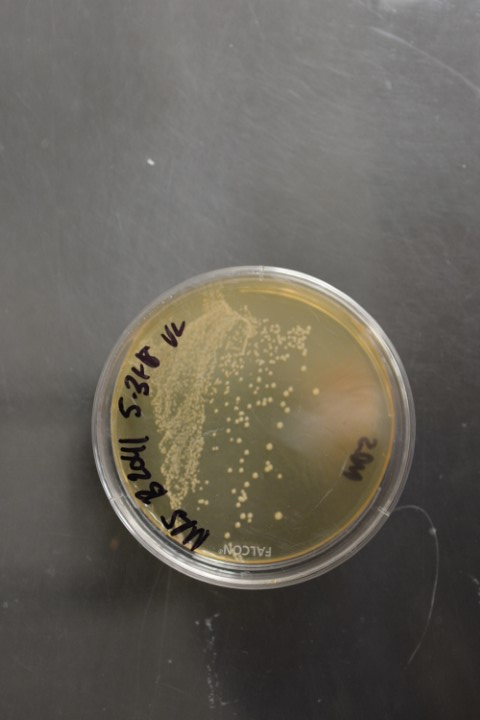
- Fructobacillus fructosus, formerly Leuconostoc fructosum

Scientific classification
- Domain: Bacteria
- Kingdom: Bacillati
- Phylum: Bacillota
- Class: Bacilli
- Order: Lactobacillales
- Family: Lactobacillaceae
- Genus: Fructobacillus; Endo and Okada 2008

Type species
- Fructobacillus fructosus (Kodama 1956) Endo and Okada 2008

Species
- Fructobacillus durionis (Leisner et al. 2005) Endo and Okada 2008; Fructobacillus ficulneus (Antunes et al. 2002) Endo and Okada 2008; Fructobacillus fructosus (Kodama 1956) Endo and Okada 2008; Fructobacillus pseudoficulneus (Chambel et al. 2006) Endo and Okada 2008; Fructobacillus tropaeoli Endo et al. 2011

= Fructobacillus =

Genus of bacteria

Fructobacillus is a genus of lactic acid bacteria belonging to the family Lactobacillaceae. It is a fructophilic lactic acid bacteria, indicating that it thrives better in fructose than in glucose and is characterized by its inability to produce ethanol.

== Phylogeny ==
The currently accepted taxonomy is based on the List of Prokaryotic names with Standing in Nomenclature and the phylogeny is based on whole-genome sequences.

- - Fructobacillus
    - - - Fructobacillus pseudoficulneus
        - Fructobacillus tropaeoli
      - Fructobacillus ficulneus
    - - Fructobacillus durionis
      - Fructobacillus fructosus
  - outgroup
    Convivina
