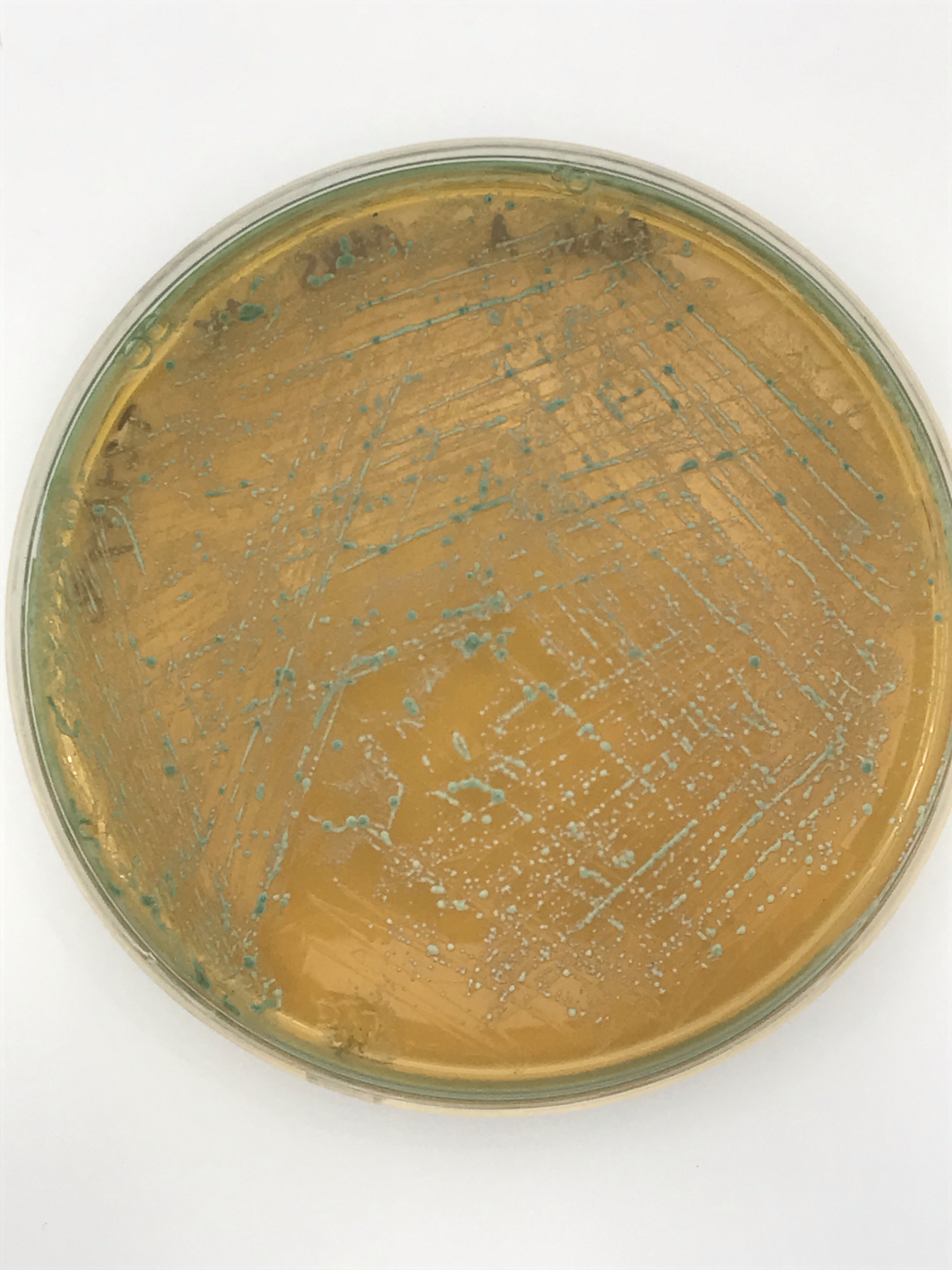
- Pediococcus acidilactici colonies streaked on a MRS plate

Scientific classification
- Domain: Bacteria
- Kingdom: Bacillati
- Phylum: Bacillota
- Class: Bacilli
- Order: Lactobacillales
- Family: Lactobacillaceae
- Genus: Pediococcus; Claussen 1903 (Approved Lists 1980)

Species
- See text

= Pediococcus =

Genus of bacteria

Pediococcus is a genus of gram-positive lactic acid bacteria, placed within the family Lactobacillaceae. They usually occur in pairs or tetrads, and divide along two planes of symmetry, as do the other lactic acid cocci genera Aerococcus and Tetragenococcus. They are purely homofermentative.

== Food processing ==
Pediococcus is, along with other lactic acid bacteria such as Leuconostoc and Lactobacillus, responsible for the fermentation of cabbage, making it sauerkraut. In this process, the sugars in fresh cabbage are fermented to lactic acid, which gives sauerkraut a sour flavour and good keeping qualities. Pediococcus bacteria are usually considered contaminants of beer and wine, although their presence is sometimes desired in beer styles such as lambic and Berliner Weisse. Certain Pediococcus isolates produce diacetyl which gives a buttery or butterscotch aroma to some wines (such as Chardonnay) and a few styles of beer. Pediococcus species are often used in silage inoculants. Pediococci are used as probiotics, and are commonly added as beneficial microbes in the creation of sausages, cheeses and yogurts.

== Species ==
The genus Pediococcus comprises the following species:

- Pediococcus acidilactici Lindner 1887 (Approved Lists 1980)
- Pediococcus argentinicus De Bruyne et al. 2008
- Pediococcus cellicola Zhang et al. 2005
- Pediococcus claussenii Dobson et al. 2002
- Pediococcus damnosus Claussen 1903 (Approved Lists 1980)
- Pediococcus ethanolidurans Liu et al. 2006
- Pediococcus inopinatus Back 1988
- Pediococcus parvulus Günther and White 1961 (Approved Lists 1980)
- Pediococcus pentosaceus Mees 1934 (Approved Lists 1980)
- "Pediococcus perniciosus" Claussen 1903 nom. inval.
- Pediococcus siamensis Tanasupawat et al. 2007
- Pediococcus stilesii Franz et al. 2006

Former members:

- "Pediococcus dextrinicus" reclassified as Lapidilactobacillus dextrinicus.
- "Pediococcus halophilus" reclassified as Tetragenococcus halophilus.
- "Pediococcus lolii" reclassified as Pediococcus acidilactici.
- "Pediococcus urinaeequi" reclassified as Aerococcus urinaeequi.
- "Pediococcus cerevisiae" strains reclassified to P. damnosus, P. acidilactici and P. pentosaceus.

== Phylogeny ==
The currently accepted taxonomy is based on the List of Prokaryotic names with Standing in Nomenclature and the phylogeny is based on whole-genome sequences.

- - Pediococcus
    - - - Pediococcus claussenii
        - Pediococcus argentinicus
      - - Pediococcus acidilactici
        - - Pediococcus pentosaceus
          - Pediococcus stilesii
    - - - Pediococcus damnosus
        - Pediococcus inopinatus
      - - Pediococcus cellicola
        - - Pediococcus ethanolidurans
          - Pediococcus parvulus
  - outgroup
    Furfurilactobacillus
