= Apilactobacillus =

Scientific classification
- Domain: Bacteria
- Kingdom: Bacillati
- Phylum: Bacillota
- Class: Bacilli
- Order: Lactobacillales
- Family: Lactobacillaceae
- Genus: Apilactobacillus; Zheng et al. 2020

Type species
- Apilactobacillus kunkeei (Edwards et al. 1998) Zheng et al. 2020

Species
- See text

Genus of bacteria

Apilactobacillus is a genus of bacteria from the family Lactobacillaceae.

== Species ==
The genus Apilactobacillus comprises the following species:

- Apilactobacillus apinorum (Olofsson et al. 2014) Zheng et al. 2020
- Apilactobacillus bombintestini (Heo et al. 2020) Mattarelli et al. 2021
- Apilactobacillus kunkeei (Edwards et al. 1998) Zheng et al. 2020
- Apilactobacillus micheneri (McFrederick et al. 2018) Zheng et al. 2020
- Apilactobacillus ozensis (Kawasaki et al. 2011) Zheng et al. 2020
- Apilactobacillus quenuiae (McFrederick et al. 2018) Zheng et al. 2020
- Apilactobacillus timberlakei (McFrederick et al. 2018) Zheng et al. 2020
- Apilactobacillus nanyangensis Liu et al. 2021

== Phylogeny ==
The currently accepted taxonomy is based on the List of Prokaryotic names with Standing in Nomenclature and the phylogeny is based on whole-genome sequences, except for the recently described A. nanyangensis, which has been added based on a 16S rRNA gene phylogeny by the GGDC web server.

- - Apilactobacillus
    - - - Apilactobacillus micheneri
        - - Apilactobacillus quenuiae
          - Apilactobacillus timberlakei
      - - Apilactobacillus apinorum
        - - Apilactobacillus kunkeei
          - Apilactobacillus nanyangensis
    - Apilactobacillus ozensis
  - outgroup
    Holzapfelia
