= Secundilactobacillus =

Scientific classification
- Domain: Bacteria
- Kingdom: Bacillati
- Phylum: Bacillota
- Class: Bacilli
- Order: Lactobacillales
- Family: Lactobacillaceae
- Genus: Secundilactobacillus; Zheng et al. 2020

Type species
- Secundilactobacillus malefermentans (Farrow et al. 1989) Zheng et al. 2020

Species
- See text.

Genus of bacteria

Secundilactobacillus is a genus of lactic acid bacteria containing secondary fermenters separated from the primary fermenters of Lactobacillus after the latter group depletes hexoses and disaccharides. These Gram-positive, rod-shaped heterofermenters have been isolated from beer and apple cider, and they are generally incapable of reducing fructose to mannitol.

== Species ==
Secundilactobacillus Cladogram

- - Secundilactobacillus
    - - - - - - Secundilactobacillus mixtipabuli
              - Secundilactobacillus silagincola
            - - Secundilactobacillus silagei
              - Secundilactobacillus pentosiphilus
          - - Secundilactobacillus odoratitofui
            - Secundilactobacillus similis
        - - Secundilactobacillus collinoides
          - Secundilactobacillus paracollinoides
      - Secundilactobacillus kimchicus
    - - Secundilactobacillus malefermentans
      - Secundilactobacillus oryzae
  - outgroup
    Holzapfelia

Phylogenetic relationships of twelve species reclassified by Zheng et al. 2020

Using whole-genome sequencing, Zheng et al. 2020 reclassified twelve Lactobacillus species into the novel genera Secundilactobacillus. The List of Prokaryotic names with Standing in Nomenclature (LPSN) currently recognizes fifteen member species:

- Secundilactobacillus angelensis Zhang et al. 2022
- Secundilactobacillus collinoides (Carr and Davies 1972) Zheng et al. 2020
- Secundilactobacillus folii Phuengjayaem et al. 2021
- Secundilactobacillus hailunensis Liu et al. 2021
- Secundilactobacillus kimchicus (Liang et al. 2011) Zheng et al. 2020
- Secundilactobacillus malefermentans (Farrow et al. 1989) Zheng et al. 2020
- Secundilactobacillus mixtipabuli (Tohno et al. 2015) Zheng et al. 2020
- Secundilactobacillus odoratitofui (Chao et al. 2010) Zheng et al. 2020
- Secundilactobacillus oryzae (Tohno et al. 2013) Zheng et al. 2020
- Secundilactobacillus paracollinoides (Suzuki et al. 2004) Zheng et al. 2020
- Secundilactobacillus pentosiphilus (Tohno et al. 2017) Zheng et al. 2020
- Secundilactobacillus silagei (Tohno et al. 2013) Zheng et al. 2020
- Secundilactobacillus silagincola (Tohno et al. 2017) Zheng et al. 2020
- Secundilactobacillus similis (Kitahara et al. 2010) Zheng et al. 2020
- Secundilactobacillus yichangensis Liu et al. 2021

These species have genomes sizes ranging from 1.85 Mbp for S. oryzae to 3.62 Mbp for S. collinoides, and their GC-content ranges from 41.03-47%.
