= Ligilactobacillus =

Scientific classification
- Domain: Bacteria
- Kingdom: Bacillati
- Phylum: Bacillota
- Class: Bacilli
- Order: Lactobacillales
- Family: Lactobacillaceae
- Genus: Ligilactobacillus; Zheng et al. 2020

Type species
- Ligilactobacillus salivarius (Rogosa et al. 1953) Zheng et al. 2020

Species
- Ligilactobacillus acidipiscis; Ligilactobacillus agilis; Ligilactobacillus animalis; Ligilactobacillus apodemi; Ligilactobacillus araffinosus; Ligilactobacillus aviarius; Ligilactobacillus ceti; Ligilactobacillus equi; Ligilactobacillus faecis; Ligilactobacillus hayakitensis; Ligilactobacillus murinus; Ligilactobacillus pabuli; Ligilactobacillus pobuzihii; Ligilactobacillus ruminis; Ligilactobacillus saerimneri; Ligilactobacillus salitolerans; Ligilactobacillus salivarius

Genus of bacteria

Ligilactobacillus is a genus of lactic acid bacteria associated with vertebrate hosts, formed through the 2020 division of the Lactobacillus genus. Most of these homofermentative species are motile and express urease to survive gastric acids, making them popular choices for probiotics. The G/C content of this genus varies between 32.5-43.3%.

== Species ==
The genus Ligilactobacillus comprises the following species:

- Ligilactobacillus acidipiscis (Tanasupawat et al. 2000) Zheng et al. 2020
- Ligilactobacillus agilis (Weiss et al. 1982) Zheng et al. 2020
- Ligilactobacillus animalis (Dent and Williams 1983) Zheng et al. 2020
- Ligilactobacillus apodemi (Osawa et al. 2006) Zheng et al. 2020
- Ligilactobacillus araffinosus (Fujisawa et al. 1986) Zheng et al. 2020
- Ligilactobacillus aviarius (Fujisawa et al. 1985) Zheng et al. 2020
- Ligilactobacillus ceti (Vela et al. 2008) Zheng et al. 2020
- Ligilactobacillus equi (Morotomi et al. 2002) Zheng et al. 2020
- Ligilactobacillus faecis (Endo et al. 2013) Zheng et al. 2020
- Ligilactobacillus hayakitensis (Morita et al. 2007) Zheng et al. 2020
- Ligilactobacillus murinus (Hemme et al. 1982) Zheng et al. 2020
- Ligilactobacillus pabuli Tohno et al. 2022
- Ligilactobacillus pobuzihii (Chen et al. 2010) Zheng et al. 2020
- Ligilactobacillus ruminis (Sharpe et al. 1973) Zheng et al. 2020
- Ligilactobacillus saerimneri (Pedersen and Roos 2004) Zheng et al. 2020
- Ligilactobacillus salitolerans (Tohno et al. 2019) Zheng et al. 2020
- Ligilactobacillus salivarius (Rogosa et al. 1953) Zheng et al. 2020

== Phylogeny ==
The currently accepted taxonomy is based on the List of Prokaryotic names with Standing in Nomenclature and the phylogeny is based on 16S rRNA sequences using Lactobacillus acidophilus ATCC 4356 as an outgroup.

- - Ligilactobacillus
    - - - - - - - Ligilactobacillus pobuzihii
                - Ligilactobacillus acidipiscis
              - Ligilactobacillus pabuli
            - Ligilactobacillus salitolerans
          - - Ligilactobacillus saerimneri
            - Ligilactobacillus ceti
        - - Ligilactobacillus aviarius
          - Ligilactobacillus araffinosus
        - - Ligilactobacillus salivarius
          - Ligilactobacillus hayakitensis
      - - - Ligilactobacillus agilis
          - Ligilactobacillus equi
        - - Ligilactobacillus ruminis
          - - Ligilactobacillus faecis
            - - Ligilactobacillus apodemi
              - - Ligilactobacillus murinus
                - Ligilactobacillus animalis
- outgroup
  Lactobacillus acidophilus
