= Lacticaseibacillus manihotivorans =

Scientific classification
- Domain: Bacteria
- Kingdom: Bacillati
- Phylum: Bacillota
- Class: Bacilli
- Order: Lactobacillales
- Family: Lactobacillaceae
- Genus: Lacticaseibacillus
- Species: L. manihotivorans

Binomial name
- Lacticaseibacillus manihotivorans (Morlon-Guyot et al. 1998) Zheng et al. 2020

Synonyms
- Lactobacillus manihotivorans Morlon-Guyot et al. 1998

Species of bacterium

Lacticaseibacillus manihotivorans is a starch-hydrolysing lactic acid bacterium first isolated during Cassava sour starch fermentation (common practise in parts of Africa and Asia). It is Gram-positive, catalase-negative, non-spore-forming, non-motile rod-shaped and homofermentative, with type strain OND 32^{T}.
