= Levilactobacillus brevis =

Scientific classification
- Domain: Bacteria
- Kingdom: Bacillati
- Phylum: Bacillota
- Class: Bacilli
- Order: Lactobacillales
- Family: Lactobacillaceae
- Genus: Levilactobacillus
- Species: L. brevis

Binomial name
- Levilactobacillus brevis (Orla-Jensen 1919) Zheng et al. 2020

Synonyms
- "Betabacterium breve" Orla-Jensen 1919; Lactobacillus brevis (Orla-Jensen 1919) Bergey et al. 1934 (Approved Lists 1980)

Species of bacterium

Levilactobacillus brevis is a gram-positive, rod shaped species of lactic acid bacteria which is heterofermentative, creating CO_{2}, lactic acid and acetic acid or ethanol during fermentation. L. brevis is the type species of the genus Levilactobacillus (previously L. brevis group), which comprises 24 species. It can be found in many different environments, such as fermented foods, and as normal microbiota. Ingestion has been shown to improve human immune function, and it has been patented several times. Normal gut microbiota L. brevis is found in human intestines, vagina, and feces.

== History ==
E.B. Fred, W.H. Peterson, and J.A. Anderson initially discovered the species in 1921 and the it was categorized based on the ability to metabolize certain carbon compounds such as the sugars. This early study showed that this can produce acetic acid, carbon dioxide and large amounts of mannitol, which is another carbon source that can be used to produce lactic acid.

== Growth and metabolism ==
L. brevis has been shown to actively transport glucose and galactose. When fructose was used as a carbon source there was only some growth and L. brevis was able to partially metabolize the fructose to mannitol. There are some strains that poorly metabolize glucose but prefer disaccharides as carbon source.

By using the fermentation pathway the result is lactic acid and acetic acid. It appears that under high temperature conditions, 50°C and in acidic environments the survival of this bacteria is longer than most bacteria under acidic conditions, the bacteria can live about 45 minutes.

Antibiotic resistance is acquired through conjugation, a method of bacterial reproduction. Conjugation permits a sharing of DNA allowing the bacterium to identify various antibiotics through exposure and this information is passed down through replication between bacteria.

Conjugation

L. brevis produces more organic acids, specifically acetic acid and ethanol. This means that this bacterium produces an increased acidic environment and alcohol. Growth conditions all depend on the location of the bacterium within the intestines. It does seem that they are unable to significantly replicate in anaerobic environments.

L. brevis is heterofermentative and uses the phosphoketolase pathway to metabolize pentoses and hexoses.

== Food preservation ==
L. brevis is found in food such as sauerkraut and pickles. It is also one of the most common causes of beer spoilage. The hop, which is an antimicrobial bitter flavoring agent in beer, fails to suppress some strains of L. brevis because they produce a transporter that pumps the active agents of hops out of the bacterial cell. Major metabolites of L. brevis include lactic acid and ethanol. Strains of L. brevis and L. hilgardii have been found to produce the biogenic amines tyramine, which is found by the fermentation metabolic pathway and is commonly found in spoiled or fermented foods and phenylethylamine, which is found in chocolates but can also produce a fishy odor in other foods.

L. brevis is one of the major lactobacilli found in water kefir grains, and has been identified as one of the species responsible for the production of the polysaccharide (dextran and kefiran) that forms the grains.

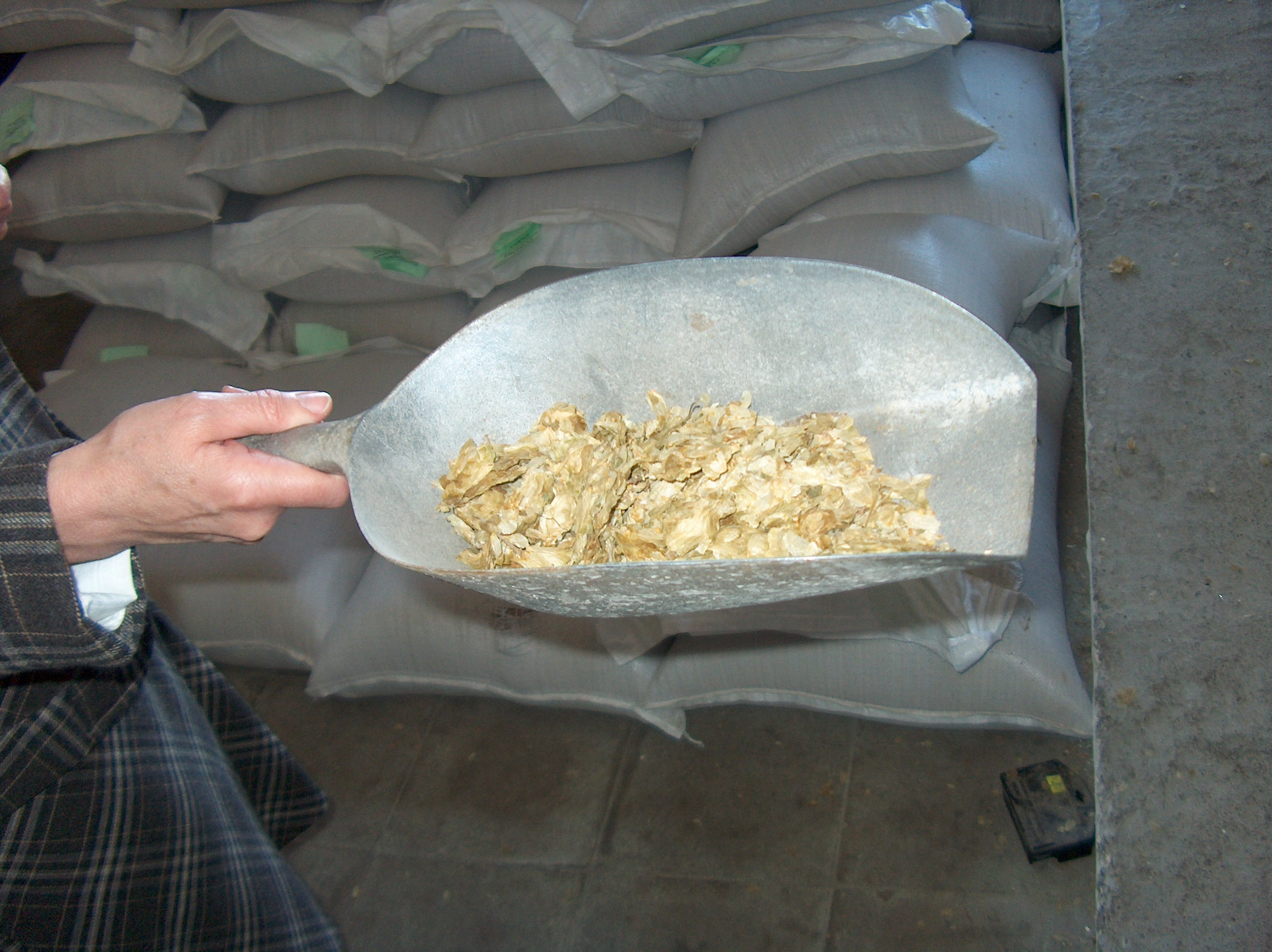
Crushed hop

.

== Microbial physiology ==
As a bacterium there are some physical attributes of L. brevis that are common for all bacteria. Gram-positive bacteria consists of an external plasma membrane, followed by periplasmic space and finally a peptidoglycan layer, which faces the interior of the bacteria. The external plasma membrane is very important for bacteria because this is how cells recognize the possible pathogenesis of the bacteria. Peptidoglycan is also called murein and is made up of a series of sugars and amino acid monomers. Within gram-positive bacteria the peptidoglycan layer is much thicker than gram-negative bacteria. The actual lattice that comprises peptidoglycan is referred to as the S-layer; this lattice is linked to the peptidoglycan layer. However, the S-layer is normally lost when processing the bacteria under laboratory conditions, which can affect measuring adhesion. When the S-layer is dissolved with high concentration levels of substances that break down hydrogen bonds the S-layers have a survival time of about 20 minutes with each generation. L. brevis contains approximately two promoters within this area, meaning that there is significant transcription of the S-layer by high levels of transcribing of the sIpA gene. SipA is a gene that has been found to aid in the coding for the production of murin (peptidoglycan) within the bacteria. The purpose of transcription is to copy DNA into a mRNA, which is used to create proteins. The promoter is used during transcription to identify the appropriate location to begin transcribing. Within probiotics it is actually the S-layer that attaches to the cellular wall of the gastrointestinal tract.

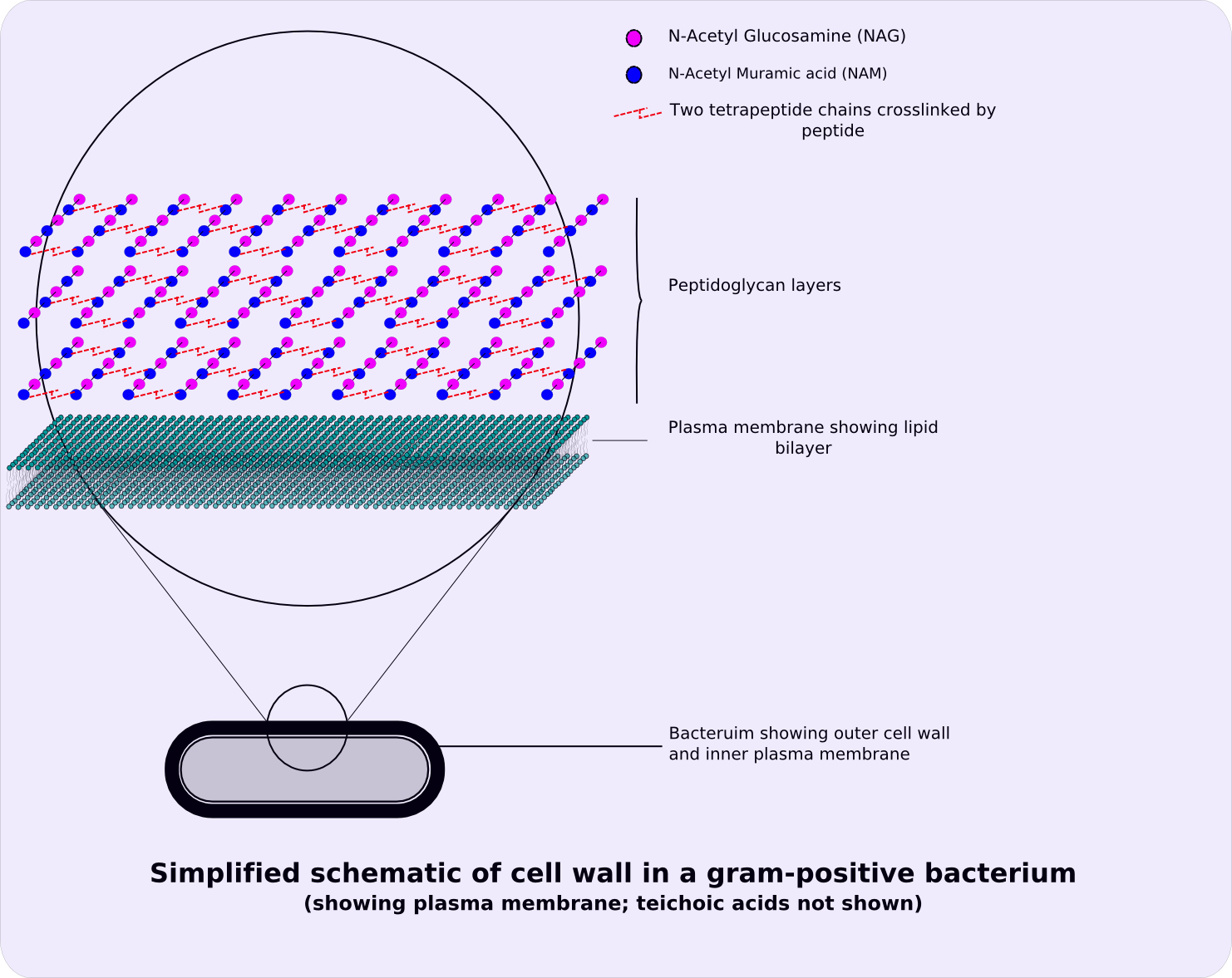
Gram-positive cellwall-schematic

== Probiotics ==
Ingestion of probiotics has been shown to improve human immune function, and L. brevis has been patented several times. L. brevis has been shown to survive in the gastrointestinal tract in humans and can therefore be used as a probiotic. Currently the bacterium does not have the ability to convert milk to yogurt however, they are appropriate to be used as an alternative to other probiotics in yogurts. Within the geriatric population use of the bacteria in milk has been shown to increase cellular immunity. Dietary probiotic supplementation enhances natural killer cell activity in the elderly (an investigation of age-related immunological changes). L. brevis is considered appropriate for probiotic use because there is significant growth at pH 4–5, particularly pH=5 is normally the appropriate range for milk and yogurts.

== Biotherapies ==
There are significant vaginal bacteria that are found within the vagina and L. brevis is included in this microbiome. The bacteria collaborate on protecting the vagina and vaginal maintenance. Women of childbearing ages have a significant amount of L. brevis and this is normally found in a healthy vagina. For some illnesses or disruptions of the vagina, this bacteria can be used in aiding to restore the microbiome. Most lactobacilli have been found useful in preventing urinary tract infections. The efficiency in which a bacterium can defend the body is:

1. Their symbiosis with potential pathogens.
2. Their capability of producing antibacterial materials, such as hydrogen peroxide, to limit pathogen growth.
3. Their production of biosurfactants that inhibit pathogen adherence.
4. Their ability to prime macrophages, leukocytes, cytokines, and other host defenses.

During normal childbirth, it appears that newborns after a period of days receive transmission of L. brevis from the mother. It appears that the transmission occurs through breast feeding or through natural child birth. In infants, this resistance is also helpful with protecting the gut against various bile and acids. Helicobacter pylori, which is a common gut pathogen in humans, studies have shown that certain strains of L. brevis are successful at combating this pathogen.

Vaginosis is the most common form of bacterial infection this is commonly diagnosed as a yeast infection or trichomoniasis, which is a sexually transmitted parasite commonly acquired during intercourse. L. brevis along with Lactobacillus jensenii has been shown to produce high levels of hydrogen peroxide which may be able remediate the bacterial vaginosis pathogenesis. L. brevis is a commonly used ingredient in pharmaceutical materials used to treat vaginosis. An evaluation of clue cells is one method of assessing vaginosis; this assessment is performed by mounting clue cells and vaginal discharge onto a slide then adding sodium chloride followed by a microscopic assessment which involves bacteria identification.

In addition to surviving within the gut of an organism, L. brevis can also act to inhibit the pathogenic effects of certain gut pathogens and can also proliferate in the presence of additional bacteria. Some strains are resistant to certain antibiotics, specifically erythromycin and clindamycin. This antibiotic resistance may be helpful in maintaining a healthy gut microbiome when taking prescribed antibiotics.

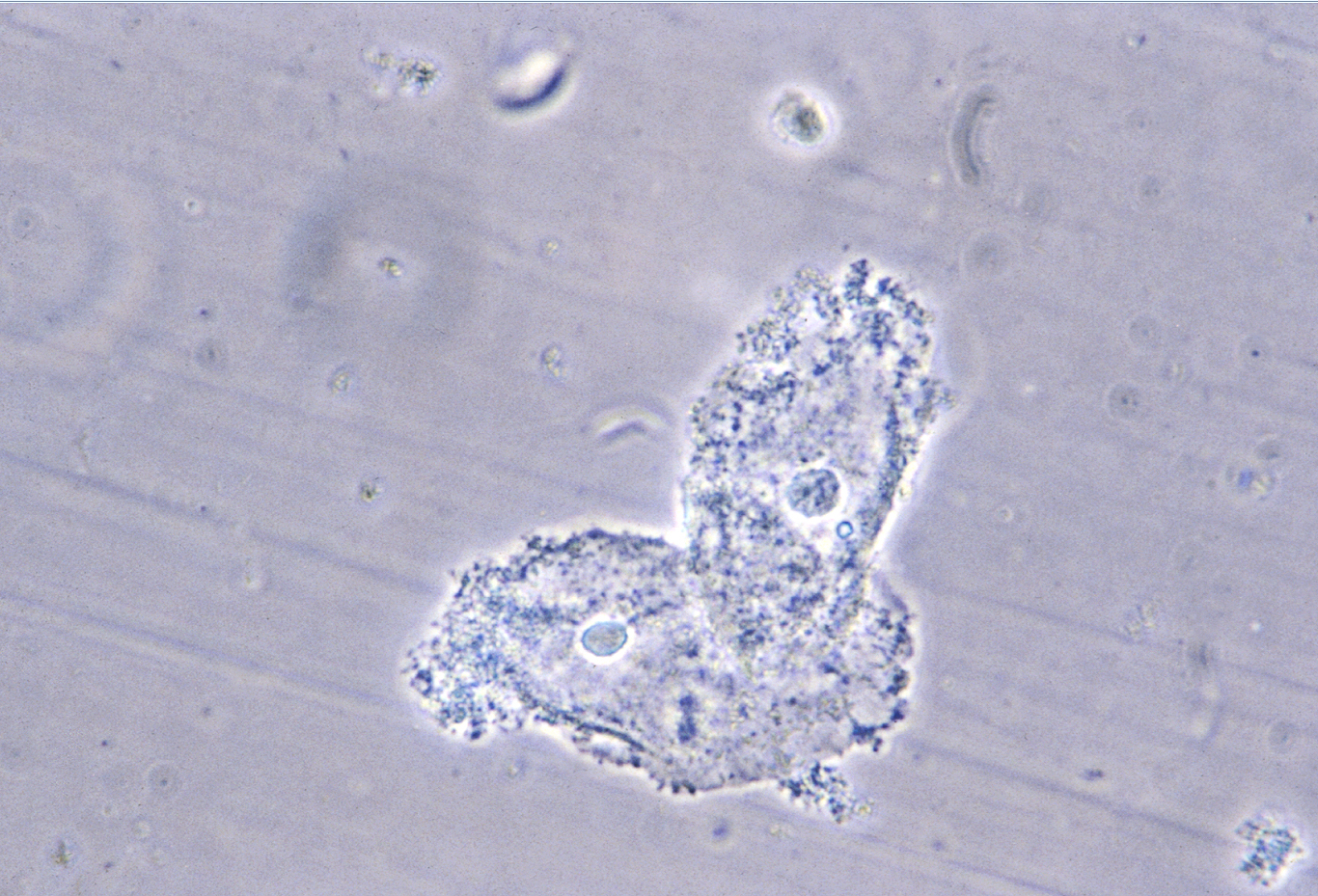
Clue cells — CDC PHIL 3720
