= Secundilactobacillus collinoides =

Scientific classification
- Domain: Bacteria
- Kingdom: Bacillati
- Phylum: Bacillota
- Class: Bacilli
- Order: Lactobacillales
- Family: Lactobacillaceae
- Genus: Secundilactobacillus
- Species: S. collinoides

Binomial name
- Secundilactobacillus collinoides (Carr and Davies 1972) Zheng et al. 2020

Synonyms
- Lactobacillus collinoides Carr and Davies 1972 (Approved Lists 1980)

Species of bacterium

Secundilactobacillus collinoides is a rod shaped species of lactic acid bacteria found in fermenting apple juice or cider. It is part of the Lactobacillaceae family. It is Gram-positive, non-spore forming and non-motile prokaryote.

== History ==
Lactobacillus was discovered in 1921 by E.B. Fred, W.H. Peterson, and J.A. Anderson and was categorized based on its ability to metabolize certain carbon and sugars. Secundilactobacillus collinoides was discovered by J.G. Carr and P.A. Davies. It was isolated in fermenting apple juice.

== Characteristics ==
Secundilactobacillus collinoides is found in fermenting apple juice or cider. It is found more frequently in factories where sulfur dioxide is either used in small quantities or not at all. It is characterized by it ability to produce lactic acid as a by-product of glucose metabolism. Sugars are necessary for growth of S. collinoides and fructose is preferred to glucose. When S. collinoides was grown with fructose or glucose as the lone carbon-source, it produced lactic acid, acetic acid and ethanol. When glycerol was present, lactic acid production was lower than expected and production of acetic acid and ethanol was higher than expected.

Secundilactobacillus collinoides is also responsible for converting glycerol to 3-hydroxy-propionaldehyde (3 HPA) which is a precursor of acrolein, which spoils product quality by conferring a bitter taste. The presence of such complex acids in fruit may indicate that more preservatives are needed to prevent spoilage.

== Risk Ffactors ==
Secundilactobacillus collinoides can be handled in Biosafety level 1 facilities, following appropriate safety procedures.

== Genomics ==
There are 9 strains of S. collinoides: JCM 1123, NBRC 107765, CECT 922, LMG 9194, KCTC 5050, DSM 20486, DSM 20515, LMG 9195, BCRC 11649. All were discovered in fermenting apple juice or cider.

== Growth ==
Depending upon the strain, the optimal growth temperature can range from 30 °C to 40 °C. The GC-content is between 39.7 mol% and 48.5 mol%. It is found in anaerobic conditions . The medium used to grow S. collinoides is lactobacilli MRS agar or broth. It cannot be grown with a medium containing glycerol as the sole carbon source.
