= Convivina intestini =

Scientific classification
- Domain: Bacteria
- Kingdom: Bacillati
- Phylum: Bacillota
- Class: Bacilli
- Order: Lactobacillales
- Family: Lactobacillaceae
- Genus: Convivina
- Species: C. intestini

Binomial name
- Convivina intestini Praet et al. 2015

Type strain
- DSM 28795; LMG 28291

Species of bacteria

Convivina intestini is a species of lactic acid bacteria.
