= Pediococcus cellicola =

Scientific classification
- Domain: Bacteria
- Kingdom: Bacillati
- Phylum: Bacillota
- Class: Bacilli
- Order: Lactobacillales
- Family: Lactobacillaceae
- Genus: Pediococcus
- Species: P. cellicola

Binomial name
- Pediococcus cellicola Zhang et al. 2005

Species of bacterium

Pediococcus cellicola is a species of Gram-positive bacteria. Strains of this species were originally isolated from a fermenting cellar in Hebei Province, China.
