= Ligilactobacillus acidipiscis =

Scientific classification
- Domain: Bacteria
- Kingdom: Bacillati
- Phylum: Bacillota
- Class: Bacilli
- Order: Lactobacillales
- Family: Lactobacillaceae
- Genus: Ligilactobacillus
- Species: L. acidipiscis

Binomial name
- Ligilactobacillus acidipiscis (Tanasupawat et al. 2000) Zheng et al. 2020

Type strain
- CCUG 46556; CIP 106750; FS60-1; HSCC 1411; JCM 10692; NBRC 102163; NRIC 300; PCU 207; TISTR 1386

Synonyms
- Lactobacillus cypricasei Lawson et al. 2001; Lactobacillus acidipiscis Tanasupawat et al. 2000

Species of bacterium

Ligilactobacillus acidipiscis is a species in the genus Ligilactobacillus. It is a homofermentative, rod-shaped lactic acid bacteria. Its type strain is FS60-1^{T}.
