= Agrilactobacillus yilanensis =

Scientific classification
- Domain: Bacteria
- Kingdom: Bacillati
- Phylum: Bacillota
- Class: Bacilli
- Order: Lactobacillales
- Family: Lactobacillaceae
- Genus: Agrilactobacillus
- Species: A. yilanensis

Binomial name
- Agrilactobacillus yilanensis (Wei and Gu 2019) Zheng et al. 2020

Type strain
- 54-2

Synonyms
- Lactobacillus yilanensis

Genus of bacteria

Agrilactobacillus yilanensis is a Gram-positive bacterium from the genus Agrilactobacillus.
