= Pediococcus damnosus =

Scientific classification
- Domain: Bacteria
- Kingdom: Bacillati
- Phylum: Bacillota
- Class: Bacilli
- Order: Lactobacillales
- Family: Lactobacillaceae
- Genus: Pediococcus
- Species: P. damnosus

Binomial name
- Pediococcus damnosus Claussen 1904

Species of bacterium

Pediococcus damnosus is a species of Gram-positive bacteria. The genus Pediococcus is a spherical cocci shaped bacteria with nonmotile, non spore-forming and homofermentative properties. P. damnosus is a chemo-organotrophic, catalase negative, facultative anaerobe. Strains of this species frequently grow in wine and beer, where they overproduce glucan and spoil products by increasing their viscosity. P. damnosus is a lactic acid bacteria (LAB), that can tolerate the low pH and higher ethanol levels that are found in beer. The ability to grow in beer is a strain specific characteristic of the species P. damnosus. Pediococcus damnosus LMG 28219 is a lactic acid bacterium that has proved to be capable of growing in beer.

== Characteristics ==
=== Growth in wine ===
Increased viscosity in wines is known as ropiness. Ropiness is a common type of spoilage in wines. Ropy wines have an oily or slimy appearance and higher viscosity due to the production of extracellular polysaccharide glucan. Lactic acid bacteria do not often produce glucan and only a few strains of lactic acid bacteria have been reported to produce glucan. P. damnosus also produces acetic acid and biogenic amines. In alcohol fermentation the presence of acetic acid inhibits the fermentation of ethanol. Increased levels of biogenic amines are correlated to compounds in wine that are indicative of wine spoilage. At increased concentrations, biogenic amines have an enhanced level of toxicity, affecting the hygienic quality of wine.

=== Growth conditions for Pediococcus damnosus ===
Pediococcus damnosus has been reported to grow successfully on MRS (CECT 8) medium with 40% beer or wine added to the culture medium with a reported pH of 5.8 and incubated at 26 °C in an anaerobic chamber for 48+ hours. CECT 8 is a growth medium designed to support the growth of lactic acid bacteria. It was designed by de Man, Rogosa, and Sharpe in 1960.

== Genome analysis ==
=== Spoilage identification of Pediococcus damnosus ===
Identification of spoilage associated diacetyl in strains of P. damnosus can be used to determine the risk of spoilage in the brewery environment. Diacetyl is a plasmid encoded trait that can be identified through diagnostic marker genes (DMG). Diagnostic marker genes are used for the identification of different bacterial groups.

BIAst Diagnostic Gene findEr (BADGE) is a tool used to predict DMG's in bacteria. It offers a straightforward procedure to comparative genomics. BADGE is used to successfully identify a DMG called fabZ. fabZ is used to discriminate between strains of P. damnosus capable of growing in beer.
