= Fructilactobacillus fructivorans =

Scientific classification
- Domain: Bacteria
- Kingdom: Bacillati
- Phylum: Bacillota
- Class: Bacilli
- Order: Lactobacillales
- Family: Lactobacillaceae
- Genus: Fructilactobacillus
- Species: F. fructivorans

Binomial name
- Fructilactobacillus fructivorans (Charlton et al. 1934) Zheng et al. 2020

Synonyms
- Lactobacillus trichodes Fornachon et al. 1949 (Approved Lists 1980); Lactobacillus fructivorans Charlton et al. 1934 (Approved Lists 1980); Lactobacillus homohiochii Kitahara et al. 1957 (Approved Lists 1980); Lactobacillus heterohiochii Kitahara et al. 1957 (Approved Lists 1980)

Species of bacterium

Fructilactobacillus fructivorans is a gram-positive bacteria and a member of the genus Fructilactobacillus in the family Lactobacillaceae. It is found in wine, beer, grape must, dairy, sauerkraut, meat, and fish. They are facultative anaerobics and experience best growth in environments with 5-10% CO_{2}. Temperature for growth is between 2 °C and 53 °C, with the optimum temperature between 30 °C and 40 °C and a pH level between 5.5 and 6.2. The bacterium is rod shaped and can be found in the following forms: single, pairs, chains of varying lengths, or long curved filaments. F. fructivorans is non-motile. The main end product of the metabolic process is lactate, although ethanol, acetate, formate, CO_{2}, and succinate may also be produced.

== Food production ==
The bacteria have several metabolic properties that allow them to function as starter cultures in the production of fermented dairy, meat, and vegetable products and beverages. F. fructivorans is mainly produces lactic acid. Once the microbe metabolizes sugars into lactic acids, the foods and beverages develop the sour taste that is characteristic of fermented foods and beverages.

While there are several types of lactobacilli that are able to convert sugars into lactic acid and CO_{2}, most are unable to survive alcoholic fermentation and will die off in this type of environment. F. fructivorans is one of the few species that successfully survives alcoholic fermentation and continues to grow and engage in cell multiplication afterwards. It therefore plays an important role in the production of fermented beverages such as wine, beer, sake and cider, yogurt, cheese, kimchi, pickled vegetables, sourdough bread and sauerkraut. In addition, the microbe is often found in meat and fish products and is responsible for spoilage of canned fruit.

== See also ==
- Mevalonic acid
