= Agrilactobacillus composti =

Scientific classification
- Domain: Bacteria
- Kingdom: Bacillati
- Phylum: Bacillota
- Class: Bacilli
- Order: Lactobacillales
- Family: Lactobacillaceae
- Genus: Agrilactobacillus
- Species: A. composti

Binomial name
- Agrilactobacillus composti (Endo and Okada 2007) Zheng et al. 2020

Type strain
- NRIC 0689

Synonyms
- Lactobacillus composti

Genus of bacteria

Agrilactobacillus composti is a bacterium from the genus Agrilactobacillus which has been isolated from compost in Japan.
