= Salivarius-1 RNA motif =

salivarius-1
- Consensus secondary structure and sequence conservation of salivarius-1 RNA

Identifiers
- Symbol: salivarius-1
- Rfam: RF03030

Other data
- RNA type: Gene; sRNA
- SO: SO:0001263
- PDB structures: PDBe

The salivarius-1 RNA motif is a conserved RNA structure that was discovered by bioinformatics. The salivarius-1 motif occurs in various strains of the species Lactobacillus salivarius, as well as some metagenomic sequences that come from unknown species. salivarius-1 RNAs likely function in trans as small RNAs. While most salivarius-1 RNAs are upstream of protein-coding genes, which could suggest a function as cis-regulatory elements, the downstream gene is often located far away. Salivarius-1 RNAs are often located nearby to other salivarius-1 RNAs.
