= Ligilactobacillus salivarius =

Scientific classification
- Domain: Bacteria
- Kingdom: Bacillati
- Phylum: Bacillota
- Class: Bacilli
- Order: Lactobacillales
- Family: Lactobacillaceae
- Genus: Ligilactobacillus
- Species: L. salivarius

Binomial name
- Ligilactobacillus salivarius (Rogosa et al. 1953) Zheng et al. 2020

Synonyms
- Lactobacillus salivarius subsp. salicinius Rogosa et al. 1953 (Approved Lists 1980); Lactobacillus salivarius Rogosa et al. 1953 (Approved Lists 1980)

Species of bacterium

Ligilactobacillus salivarius is a probiotic bacteria species that has been found to live in the gastrointestinal tract and exert a range of therapeutic properties including suppression of pathogenic bacteria.

== Therapeutic research ==
=== Irritable bowel syndrome ===
Ligilactobacillus salivarius has been found to be of benefit in the alleviation of flatulence in individuals suffering from irritable bowel syndrome.

=== Pancreatic necrosis ===
Pancreatic necrosis, if left untreated, has an almost 100 percent fatality rate due to bacterial translocation. Ligilactobacillus salivarius has been found to have a wide spectrum of coverage against pathogenic organisms that translocate from the gastrointestinal tract thereby demonstrating therapeutic benefit in the management of pancreatic necrosis. Research has shown that the addition of this species along with other probiotic species (specifically Bifidobacterium bifidum, Bifidobacterium infantis, Lactobacillus acidophilus, Lacticaseibacillus casei, and Lactococcus lactis) suppressed pro-inflammatory cytokines and further suppressed bacterial overgrowth in the small intestine leading to a reduction in bacterial translocation.

=== Atopic dermatitis ===
Some studies have shown atopic dermatitis symptoms have been shown to be reversed in some children who given probiotics containing L. salivarius.

=== Oral health ===
Ligilactobacillus salivarius has been shown in some studies to improve periodontal health by reducing bleeding on probing and inhibiting harmful bacteria. While some strains may increase the risk of dental caries, others can decrease levels of Streptococcus mutans and enhance salivary buffering capacity, which may create a protective effect against dental caries and tooth decay. Additionally, L. salivarius may help manage halitosis by reducing bacteria associated with bad breath.
