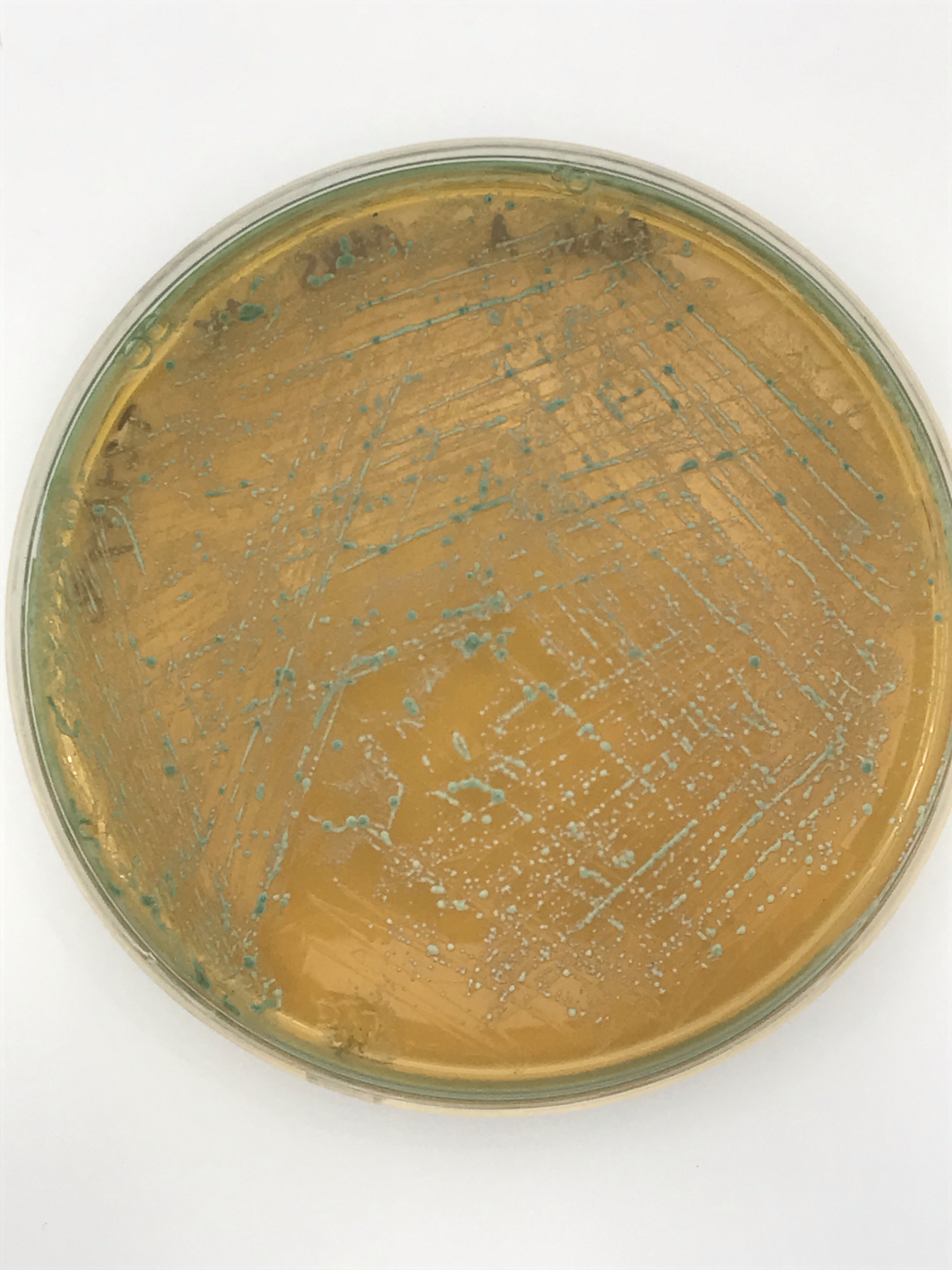
- Pediococcus acidilactici colonies on an MRS agar plate

Scientific classification
- Domain: Bacteria
- Kingdom: Bacillati
- Phylum: Bacillota
- Class: Bacilli
- Order: Lactobacillales
- Family: Lactobacillaceae
- Genus: Pediococcus
- Species: P. acidilactici

Binomial name
- Pediococcus acidilactici Lindner 1887 (Approved Lists 1980)

= Pediococcus acidilactici =

Species of bacterium

Pediococcus acidilactici is a species of Gram-positive cocci that is often found in pairs or tetrads. P. acidilactici is a homofermentative bacterium that can grow in a wide range of pH, temperature, and osmotic pressure, therefore being able to colonize the digestive tract. It has emerged as a potential probiotic that has shown promising results in animal and human experiments. However, some of the results are limited. They are commonly found in fermented vegetables, fermented dairy products, and meat.

Pediococcus acidilactici is a facultative anaerobe that grows well on de Man, Rogosa, Sharpe agar of an optimum pH of 6.2, with an overnight incubation at 37 and 45 °C (99 and 113 °F). It is also viable at higher temperatures up to 65 °C (149 °F).

This species is also acidophilic, and viable at very low pH. The probiotic P. acidilactici is a facultative anaerobe with lesser sensitivity to oxygen. Pediococci exert antagonism against other microorganisms, including enteric pathogens, primarily through the production of lactic acid and secretion of bacteriocins known as pediocins.

== Potential benefits ==
Pediococcus acidilactici has a wide range of potential benefits which are still being studied. Though it is being used as a probiotic supplement to treat constipation, and diarrhea, relieve stress, and enhance immune response among birds and small animals, human trials are still limited. P. acidilactici is also known to prevent colonization of the small intestine by pathogens such as Shigella spp., Salmonella spp., Clostridioides difficile, and Escherichia coli among small animals.

=== Digestive disorders ===
Pediococcus acidilactici has been used to treat dogs with digestive disorders and those infected by parvovirus. Before treatment with orally administered mixtures of P. acidilactici and Saccharomyces boulardii, the dogs diagnosed with parvovirus infection were shown to exhibit severe gastrointestinal distress such as vomiting and bloody diarrhea. After the treatment for three days, the bloody diarrhea ceased and the dogs had solid stools.

=== Alternative medicine ===
Pediococcus acidilactici has not been stated in any literature to have toxic effects. Another potential benefit of using them as probiotics is their use as alternative medicines against infectious parasitic pathogens such as Eimeria in broiler chickens. P. acidilactici in conjunction with S. boulardii stimulates humoral immune response to produce higher Eimeria-specific antibody levels while also reducing the number of oocysts shed by possible competitive inhibition and pediocin production, which inhibit pathogenic bacteria and other Gram-positive spoilage.

=== Immune health benefits ===
Pediococcus acidilactici can function as an immune modulator. Animals fed with P. acidilactici have shown enhanced immune responses against infectious coccidioidal diseases.

=== Antibiotic treatment ===
Dogs typically undergo antibiotic treatment to eliminate infectious pathogens or parasites and to prevent secondary infections. However, the treatment with antibiotics can also disrupt the ecosystems of beneficial microorganisms in the dog's gastrointestinal (GI) tract. When dogs with digestive disorders were treated by antibiotics together with P. acidilactici probiotic products, the surviving millions of bacteria were able to alleviate the disrupted balance of microorganisms in dogs’ GI tracts caused by antibiotics treatment and to normalize the intestinal microflora.

Moreover, since antibiotics kill many of competitive pathogenic microorganisms, Pediococcus products can have better beneficial effects in dogs and cats' GI tracts when administered with antibiotics.

== Difference from other probiotic strains ==
Most strains of Lactobacillus and Bifidobacterium are sensitive to room temperature, which raises concerns for storage conditions and maintenance of cell viability. In addition, most Lactobacillus and Bifidobacterium species are sensitive to acidic exposure and have difficulty surviving environments with low pH, such as stomach acid. Therefore, obtaining consistent and reproducible results becomes the major challenge for the commercial products of Lactobacillus and Bifidobacterium.
