= Secundilactobacillus kimchicus =

Scientific classification
- Domain: Bacteria
- Kingdom: Bacillati
- Phylum: Bacillota
- Class: Bacilli
- Order: Lactobacillales
- Family: Lactobacillaceae
- Genus: Secundilactobacillus
- Species: S. kimchicus

Binomial name
- Secundilactobacillus kimchicus (Liang et al. 2011) Zheng et al. 2020

Synonyms
- Lactobacillus kimchicus Liang et al. 2011

Species of bacterium

Secundilactobacillus kimchicus is a rod-shaped species of lactic acid bacteria isolated from kimchi, a Korean dish involving fermented vegetables. It is part of the Lactobacillaceae family. It is Gram-positive, non-spore forming and non-motile prokaryote.

This species grows between 15 and 45 °C and pH 5.0-9.0. Whole-genome sequencing has shown that S. kimchicus has a 2.59 Mbp long genome with 46.6% GC-content.
