= Pediococcus claussenii =

Scientific classification
- Domain: Bacteria
- Kingdom: Bacillati
- Phylum: Bacillota
- Class: Bacilli
- Order: Lactobacillales
- Family: Lactobacillaceae
- Genus: Pediococcus
- Species: P. claussenii

Binomial name
- Pediococcus claussenii Dobson et al. 2002

Species of bacterium

Pediococcus claussenii is a species of Gram-positive bacteria. Like other Pediococcus species, P. claussenii is implicated in the spoilage of fermented beverages due to its production of diacetyl. Strains of this species were originally isolated from spoiled beer.

The genome of P. claussenii strain ATCC BAA-344 has been sequenced.
