= Paucilactobacillus wasatchensis =

Scientific classification
- Domain: Bacteria
- Kingdom: Bacillati
- Phylum: Bacillota
- Class: Bacilli
- Order: Lactobacillales
- Family: Lactobacillaceae
- Genus: Paucilactobacillus
- Species: P. wasatchensis

Binomial name
- Paucilactobacillus wasatchensis (Oberg et al. 2016) Zheng et al. 2020

Type strain
- DSM 29958; LMG 28678; WDC04

Synonyms
- Lactobacillus wasatchensis Oberg et al. 2016

Species of bacteria

Paucilactobacillus wasatchensis is a species of heterofermentative lactic acid bacteria (LAB). It is a non-starter LAB that was first isolated from aged Cheddar cheese showing gas defects from three different continents. The growth of P. wasatchensis is accelerated when ripening cheese is supplemented with ribose and galactose and incubated at elevated temperature (12 °C versus 6 °C). P. wasatchensis can be controlled by pasteurization, but post-pasteurization sources of contamination must be controlled.
