= Outgroup =

Outgroup may refer to:

- Outgroup (cladistics), an evolutionary-history concept
- Outgroup (sociology), a social group
