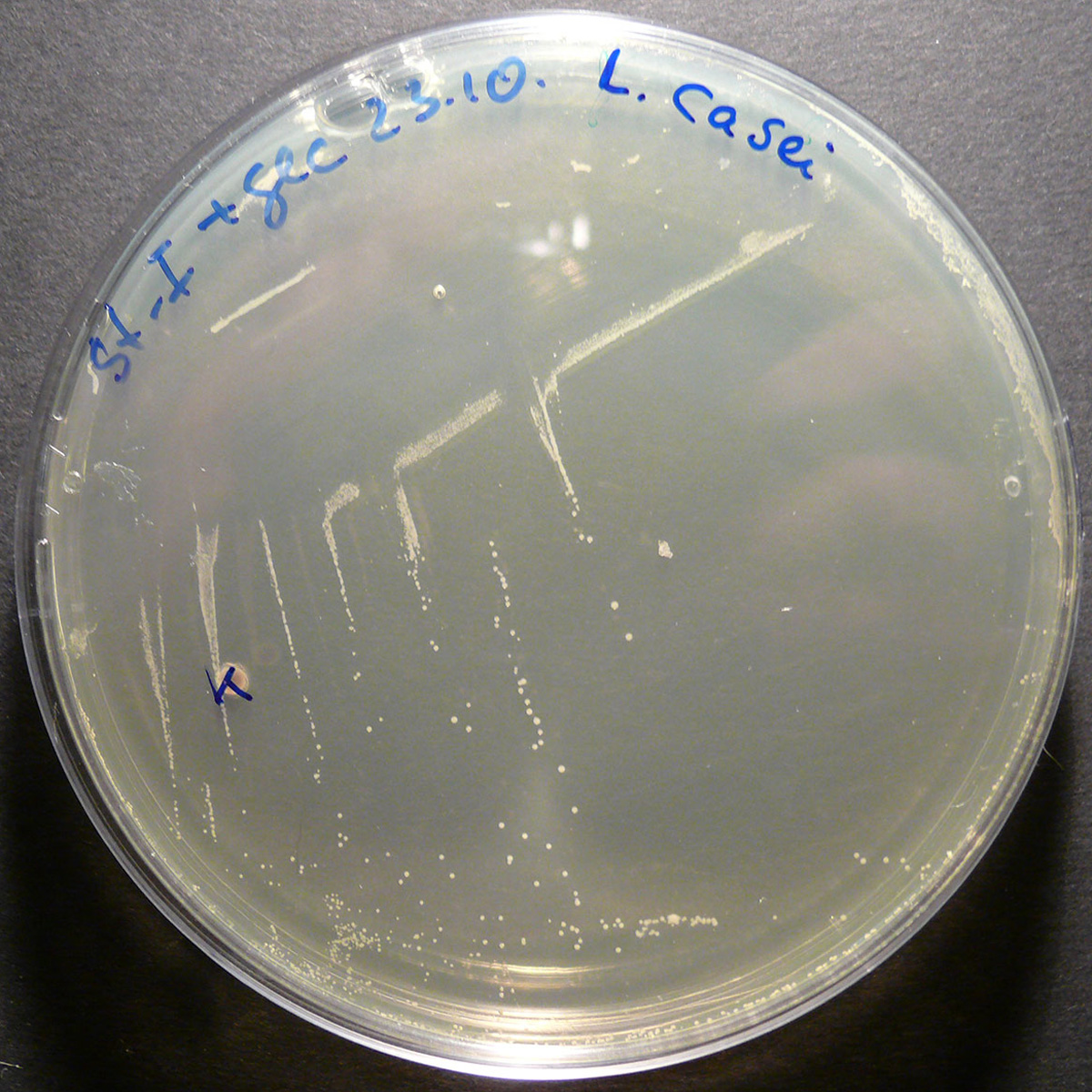
- Lactobacillus casei in a Petri dish

Scientific classification
- Domain: Bacteria
- Kingdom: Bacillati
- Phylum: Bacillota
- Class: Bacilli
- Order: Lactobacillales
- Family: Lactobacillaceae
- Genus: Lacticaseibacillus
- Species: L. casei

Binomial name
- Lacticaseibacillus casei (Orla-Jensen 1916) Zheng et al. 2020

Synonyms
- "Caseobacterium vulgare" Orla-Jensen 1916; Lactobacillus casei (Orla-Jensen 1916) Hansen and Lessel 1971 (Approved Lists 1980)

= Lacticaseibacillus casei =

Species of bacterium

Lacticaseibacillus casei is an organism that belongs to the largest genus in the family Lactobacillaceae, a lactic acid bacteria (LAB), that was previously classified as Lactobacillus casei. This bacteria has been identified as facultatively anaerobic or microaerophilic, acid-tolerant, non-spore-forming bacteria.

This species is a non-sporing, rod-shaped, gram positive microorganism that can be found within the reproductive and digestive tract of the human body. Since L. casei can survive in a variety of environmental habitats, it has and continues to be extensively studied by health scientists. Commercially, L. casei is used in fermenting dairy products and its application as a probiotic.

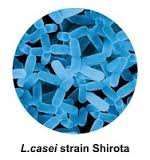
Shirota, a Lactobacillus casei strain.

In bacteraemia, it is regarded to be similar in pathogenicity to Lactobacillus and associated with infective endocarditis.

== Taxonomy ==
The taxonomy of the L. casei group has been debated for several years because researchers struggled to differentiate between the strains of L. casei and L. paracasei using methods of traditional bacteriology, i.e. phenotypic, physiological, and biochemical similarities. In the 1990s, researchers began to realize that the type strain for L. casei, ATCC 393, does not quite match most other strains classified as "L. casei" by then. To solve this discrepancy, Dellaglio et al. argued to simply replace the type with ATCC 334, which is closer to these "other strains", and to bury the name "L. paracasei". This argument was not accepted by the ICSP, which ruled in 1994 and 2008 that the type strain should not be changed. ICSP also mentions that ATCC 334 is a strain of L. paracasei, meaning that it's the aforementioned "other strains" that need to be moved to paracasei.

The next major event in taxonomic revision came with Zheng et al. 2020, which split Lactobacillus into several genera on phylogenomic grounds. L. casei was made the type species of Lacticaseibacillus, containing more than 20 species.

As of December 2023, the accepted taxonomy under the species complex is as follows:

- Lacticaseibacillus casei (Orla-Jensen 1916) Zheng et al. 2020
  - Lactobacillus casei subsp. pseudoplantarum Abo-Elnaga and Kandler 1965 (Approved Lists 1980) was not adjusted by Zheng, but remains valid. It is, however, phylogenomically problematic: the type strain is classified by ATCC, JCM, and BCCM as L. paracasei subsp. paracasei.
- Lacticaseibacillus chiayiensis (Huang et al. 2018) Zheng et al. 2020
- Lacticaseibacillus paracasei (Collins et al. 1989) Zheng et al. 2020
  - Lacticaseibacillus paracasei subsp. paracasei (Collins et al. 1989) Zheng et al. 2020
  - Lacticaseibacillus paracasei subsp. tolerans (Abo-Elnaga and Kandler 1965) Zheng et al. 2020
- Lacticaseibacillus rhamnosus (Hansen 1968) Zheng et al. 2020
- Lactobacillus zeae (Dicks et al. 1996 ex Kuznetsov 1959) Liu and Gu 2020

== Uses ==
=== Dairy ===
The most common application of L. casei is industrial, specifically for dairy production.

Lacticaseibacillus casei is typically the dominant species of nonstarter lactic acid bacteria (i.e. contaminant bacteria) present in ripening cheddar cheese, and, recently, the complete genome sequence of L. casei ATCC 334 has become available. L. casei is also the dominant species in naturally fermented Sicilian green olives.

=== Medical ===
A commercial beverage containing L. casei strain Shirota has been shown to inhibit the in vivo growth of Helicobacter pylori, but when the same beverage was consumed by humans in a small trial, H. pylori colonization decreased only slightly, and the trend was not statistically significant. Some L. casei strains are considered to be probiotic, and may be effective in alleviation of gastrointestinal pathogenic bacterial diseases. According to World Health Organization, those properties have to be demonstrated on each specific strain—including human clinical studies—to be valid. L. casei has been combined with other probiotic strains of bacteria in randomized trials studying its effects in preventing antibiotic-associated diarrhea (AAD) and Clostridioides difficile infections (CDI), and patients in the trials who were not given the placebo had significantly lower rates of AAD or CDI (depending on the trial) with no adverse effects reported. Additionally, trials have shown significantly shorter recovery times in children suffering from acute diarrhea (primarily caused by rotavirus) when given different L. casei treatments when compared to placebo. Studies suggest that lactobacilli are a safe and effective treatment for acute and infectious diarrhea.

In the preparation of food, L. casei bacteria can be used in the natural fermentation of beans to lower levels of the compounds causing flatulence upon digestion.

Another strain that has been studied is "01", also known as "Lc-01" or Lacticaseibacillus casei-01.

=== Commercial probiotic ===
Among the best-documented probiotic strains of L. casei, L. casei DN-114001 (Actimel/DanActive) and L. casei Shirota (Yakult) have been extensively studied and are widely available as functional foods.

The genomes of these two strains have been sequenced from commercial yogurt, re-designated "LcA" and "LcY" respectively. They were found to be extremely closely related.

=== Others ===
In the past few years, many studies have been conducted in the decolorization of azo dyes by lactic acid bacteria such as L. casei TISTR 1500, L. paracasei, Oenococcus oeni, etc. With the azoreductase activity, mono- and diazo bonds are degraded completely, and generate other aromatic compounds as intermediates.

== Characteristics of Lactocaseibacillus casei ==
The following table includes the colony, morphological, physiological, and biochemical characteristics of L. casei.

Test type	Test	Characteristics
Colony characteristics	Type	Smooth
Colony characteristics	Color	Opaque without pigment
Colony characteristics	Shape	Convex
Morphological characteristics	Arrangement	Short chains
Morphological characteristics	Size	0.7-1.1 x 2.0-4.0 mm
Morphological characteristics	Shape	Rod
Morphological characteristics	Gram stain	+
Morphological characteristics	Spores	-
Physiological characteristics	Motility	-
Physiological characteristics	Growth on 4% NaCl	+
Physiological characteristics	Growth on 6.5% NaCl	-
Biochemical characteristics	Oxidase	-
Biochemical characteristics	Catalase	-
Biochemical characteristics	Glucose	-
Biochemical characteristics	Lactose	+
Biochemical characteristics	Sucrose	+
Biochemical characteristics	Mannitol	+
Biochemical characteristics	Starch	+
Biochemical characteristics	Liquid hydrolysis	+
Biochemical characteristics	Indole	-
Biochemical characteristics	Methyl red	-
Biochemical characteristics	Voges-Proskauer	-
Biochemical characteristics	Citrate	+
Biochemical characteristics	Nitrate reduction	-
Biochemical characteristics	Urease	-
Hydrolysis of	Galactose	+
Hydrolysis of	Casein	+
Utilization of	Glycerol	+
Utilization of	Galactose	+
Utilization of	D-Glucose	+
Utilization of	D-Fructose	+
Utilization of	D-Mannose	+
Utilization of	Mannitol	+

=== Transformation ===
Bacterial evolution is frequently influenced by the incorporation of extracellular genetic material through a process called horizontal gene transfer (HGT). A wide variety of comparative analyses were used to determine that HGT influenced the evolution of the Lactobacillus genus. HGT in L. casei includes transformation, conjugation, and transduction. The mobile genetic elements found within the genome, known as mobilomes, play an important role in Lactobacillaceae transfer. This includes insertion sequences, bacteriophages, integrons, plasmids, genomic islands, and transposons. In lactobacilli, they are responsible for metabolizing different molecules, hydrolyzing proteins, resisting antibiotics, DNA, and phages, and modifying genetic elements.

One type of gene transfer used by Lactobacillus is transformation. This includes the uptake of naked DNA by a recipient bacterial cell to gain the genetic information of a donor cell. This occurs after a donor bacterium has undergone autolysis and its DNA fragments are left within the free extracellular fluid. The recipient bacterium will then ingest the DNA fragments and will result in either a bacterial cell with a plasmid or recombination of the recipient DNA will transpire within the chromosome.

Alternatively, gene transfer may occur through conjugation, a process that involves the transfer of DNA from a Lactobacillus donor to a recipient via cell-to-cell contact or direct cytoplasmic contact. In conjugation, the recipient cell is known as the transconjugant. Once the cells come together, fragments of DNA are directly transferred from the donor to the transconjugant. This is mediated by pheromone-induced cell aggregation and mobilization proteins since many of the plasmids are unable to transfer on their own. Afterward, the mating cells will separate and a recombinant cell will be produced after homologous recombination.

Finally, transduction in Lactobacillus cells is a bacteriophage-mediated transfer of plasmid or chromosomal genetic information. To initiate transduction, a bacteriophage must first infect the donor cell so that lysis of the cell will occur. At this point, the cell lysate will be filled with phages which carry donated genome fragments and the recipient cell will be injected with abnormal phage. The result of transduction is a recombinant cell whether the cell is infected after homologous recombination or after the infection occurs by bacteriophage integrase.

== See also ==
- Prebiotic (nutrition)
- Lactic acid bacteria
