= Furfurilactobacillus =

Scientific classification
- Domain: Bacteria
- Kingdom: Bacillati
- Phylum: Bacillota
- Class: Bacilli
- Order: Lactobacillales
- Family: Lactobacillaceae
- Genus: Furfurilactobacillus; Zheng et al. 2020

Type species
- Furfurilactobacillus rossiae (Corsetti et al. 2005) Zheng et al. 2020

Species
- Furfurilactobacillus curtus (Asakawa et al. 2017) Zheng et al. 2020; Furfurilactobacillus rossiae (Corsetti et al. 2005) Zheng et al. 2020; Furfurilactobacillus siliginis (Aslam et al. 2006) Zheng et al. 2020

Genus of bacteria

Furfurilactobacillus is a genus of lactic acid bacteria.

== Phylogeny ==
The currently accepted taxonomy is based on the List of Prokaryotic names with Standing in Nomenclature and the phylogeny is based on whole-genome sequences.

- - Furfurilactobacillus
    - - Furfurilactobacillus rossiae
      - Furfurilactobacillus siliginis
    - Furfurilactobacillus curtus
  - outgroup
    Holzapfelia
