= Apilactobacillus apinorum =

Scientific classification
- Domain: Bacteria
- Kingdom: Bacillati
- Phylum: Bacillota
- Class: Bacilli
- Order: Lactobacillales
- Family: Lactobacillaceae
- Genus: Apilactobacillus
- Species: A. apinorum

Binomial name
- Apilactobacillus apinorum (Olofsson et al. 2014) Zheng et al. 2020

Synonyms
- Lactobacillus apinorum Olofsson et al. 2014

Bacterium

Apilactobacillus apinorum is a Gram-positive, non-spore-forming and non-motile bacterium from the genus of Apilactobacillus which has been isolated from the stomach of a Western honey bee.
