= L. kimchii =

L. kimchii may refer to:

- Lactobacillus kimchii, a bacteriocin-producing lactic acid bacterium
- Leuconostoc kimchii, a Gram-positive bacterium in the genus Leuconostoc

== See also ==
- Kimchii
