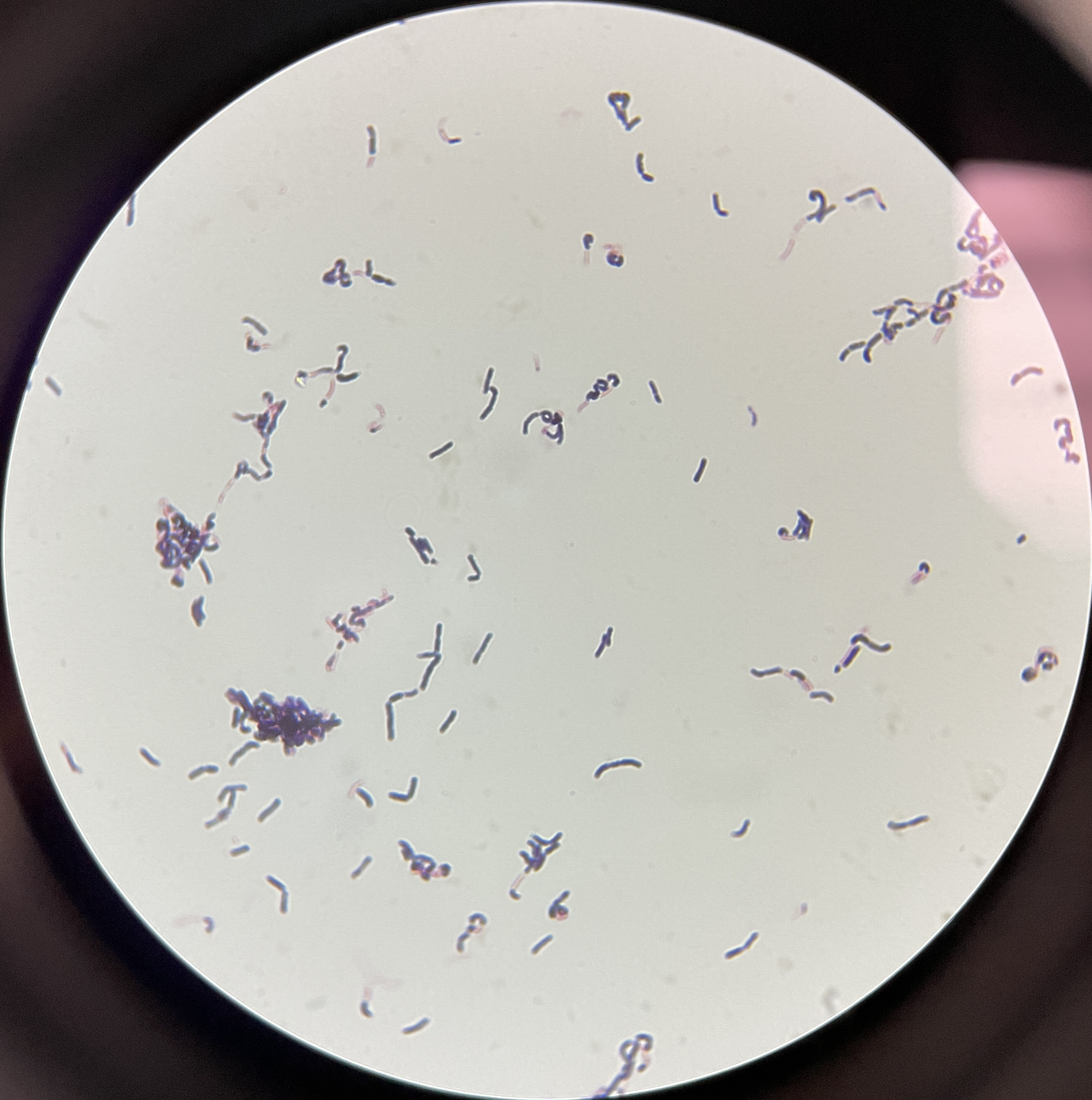
- 1000x magnification of a Gram-stained sample of Ligilactobacillus animalis

Scientific classification
- Domain: Bacteria
- Kingdom: Bacillati
- Phylum: Bacillota
- Class: Bacilli
- Order: Lactobacillales
- Family: Lactobacillaceae
- Genus: Ligilactobacillus
- Species: L. animalis

Binomial name
- Ligilactobacillus animalis (Dent and Williams 1983) Zheng et al. 2020

Type strain
- ATCC 35046; CCUG 33906; CIP 103152; DSM 20602; IFO 15882; JCM 5670; LMG 9843; NBRC 15882; NCDO 2425; NCFB 2425; NCIMB 13278; NRRL B-14176

Synonyms
- Lactobacillus animalis Dent and Williams 1983

= Ligilactobacillus animalis =

Species of bacterium

Ligilactobacillus animalis is a non-motile, homofermentative species in the Gram-positive genus Ligilactobacillus, initially isolated from the dental plaque of primates and intestinal samples of a dog and mouse. L. animalis has optimal growth at 37 °C on MRS agar, making this species mesophilic. The first reported isolates could ferment cellobiose, fructose, glucose, lactose, maltose, melibiose, raffinose, and salicin, but not xylose. The genome size of the type strain is 1.89 Mbp and the G/C content is 41.1%.
