= Paralactobacillus selangorensis =

Scientific classification
- Domain: Bacteria
- Kingdom: Bacillati
- Phylum: Bacillota
- Class: Bacilli
- Order: Lactobacillales
- Family: Lactobacillaceae
- Genus: Paralactobacillus
- Species: P. selangorensis

Binomial name
- Paralactobacillus selangorensis Leisner et al. 2000

Type strain
- ATCC BAA-66; CCUG 43347; CIP 106482; DSM 13344; LMG 17710

Synonyms
- Paralactobacillus selangorensis Zheng et al. 2020; Lactobacillus selangorensis (Leisner et al. 2000) Haakensen et al. 2011

Species of bacteria

Paralactobacillus selangorensis is a species of lactic acid bacteria.
