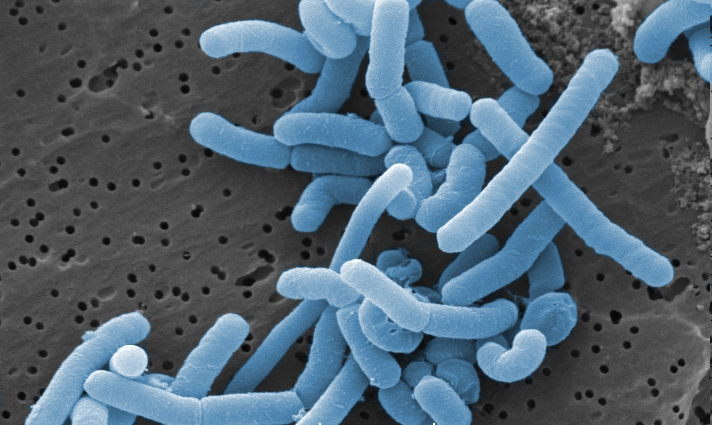

Scientific classification
- Domain: Bacteria
- Kingdom: Bacillati
- Phylum: Bacillota
- Class: Bacilli
- Order: Lactobacillales
- Family: Lactobacillaceae
- Genus: Lacticaseibacillus
- Species: L. paracasei

Binomial name
- Lacticaseibacillus paracasei (Collins et al. 1989) Zheng et al. 2020

Subspecies
- Lacticaseibacillus paracasei subsp. paracasei; Lacticaseibacillus paracasei subsp. tolerans

Synonyms
- Lactobacillus paracasei Collins et al. 1989

= Lacticaseibacillus paracasei =

Species of bacterium

Lacticaseibacillus paracasei (commonly abbreviated as Lc. paracasei) is a gram-positive, heterofermentative species of lactic acid bacteria that are commonly used in dairy product fermentation and as probiotic cultures. Lc. paracasei is a bacterium that operates by commensalism. It is commonly found in many human habitats such as human intestinal tracts and mouths as well as sewages, silages, and previously mentioned dairy products especially yogurt. The name includes morphology, a rod-shaped (bacillus shape) bacterium with a width of 2.0 to 4.0μm and length of 0.8 to 1.0μm.

Strains of L. paracasei have been isolated from a variety of environments including dairy products, plants or plant fermentations, and from the human and animal gastrointestinal tracts. A protracted refrigeration period before in vitro gastrointestinal transit (GIT) did not affect or influenced very weakly cell resistance.

Lacticaseibacillus paracasei is genotypically and phenotypically closely related from other members of the Lacticaseibacillus casei group which also includes Lacticaseibacillus casei, Lacticaseibacillus zeae and Lacticaseibacillus rhamnosus. However, these species are readily differentiated from each other by Multi-Locus-Sequence-Typing, core genome phylogeny, or Average Nucleotide Identity. Its fermentative properties allows it to be used as biological food processors and supplements for diets and medical disorders, especially in the gastrointestinal tract.

Although probiotics are considered safe, they may cause bacteria-host interactions and adverse health consequences. In certain cases there is a risk of bacteremia when probiotics are used. Currently, the probiotic strain, frequency, dose and duration of the probiotic therapies are not established.

== Physiology ==
Lacticaseibacillus paracasei is a gram-positive, facultatively heterofermentative, non-spore forming microorganism. The cells of Lc. paracasei are typically rod shaped, with a size range of 2.0μm to 4.0μm in width, and 0.8 to 1.0μm in length. The organism is nonmotile. Lc. paracasei cells often have square ends, and may exist either in single form or in chains.

Lacticaseibacillus paracasei grows optimally in a temperature range between 10 and 37 °C. No growth takes place above 40 °C. The organism is able to survive for approximately 40 seconds in a maximum temperature of 72 °C. The survivability of Lc. paracasei was remarkably higher when stored under refrigeration (4 °C). In contrast, the lowest survival was observed during non-refrigerated storage(22 °C) Freezing at -20 degrees C and -70 degrees C had much less adverse effect on viability than did storage at 7 degrees C

Lacticaseibacillus paracasei temporarily exists as a common inhabitant of the human gastrointestinal tract as part of the normal microbiota. Naturally fermented vegetables, milk, and meat may also contain strains of L. paracasei.

== Phylogeny ==
Lacticaseibacillus paracasei belongs to kingdom Bacteria. Lc. paracasei is part of the phylum Bacillota, the class Bacilli, the order Lactobacillales and the family Lactobacillaceae respectively. The argument on the nomenclature of L. paracasei versus L. casei was intensely debated as many strains of L. casei or L. paracasei for which sequence data is available in the databases are mis-labeled. In 1989, it was proposed that L. paracasei be designated a subspecies (paracasei) to account for the species that it shares DNA homology with. It has been shown their names have been used interchangeably in scientific literature. 16S RNA sequence homology has confirmed the relatedness between these species but core genome phylogeny confirmed that the closely related species Lc. casei, Lc. paracasei, Lc. rhamnosus and Lc. zeae are separate species.

Historically, the difference between Lacticaseibacillus paracasei and other lactobacilli has been based on biochemical characteristics. There is an approximately 90% sequence identity between casei, paracasei, and rhamnosus. However, there are some differential criteria that are commonly used to differentiate between them. These differential criteria include nutritional requirements and growth environment. L. paracasei has been found to show specific differences with other lactobacilli in that it is somewhat heat resistant, grows well in ripening cheese, and it has high proteolytic activity.

== Genomics ==
Lacticaseibacillus paracasei's genome contains circular DNA and varies slightly among the different strains isolated. On average, the genomes are 2.9 to 3.0 million base pairs (commonly abbreviated Mb). It has a GC-content between 46.2 and 46.6% and is predicted to encode about 2800 to 3100 proteins. The difference in the genomes of these strains lies in variant cell envelopes, secretory proteins, and polysaccharides. Many of the commonly coded proteins are cell-surface associated cell-wall hydrolases that protect the cell against apoptosis. These enzymes have been shown to provide cellular protection to human epithelial cells.

Genetic diversity for the different L. paracasei genomes was assessed using multilocus sequence typing (MLST) and amplified fragment length polymorphism (AFLP). MLST is a technique used for classifying microbes by the use of DNA fragments from essential genes of the organism. AFLP is a Polymerase Chain Reaction (PCR) tool used in DNA profiling to amplify a desired DNA fragment with the use of restriction enzymes and ligands.

== Clinical and research applications ==
Lacticaseibacillus paracasei has been identified as a bacterium that has probiotic properties.

=== Allergic respiratory disease ===
A systematic review provided significant evidence of beneficial clinical and immunologic effects of Lc. paracasei LP-33 strains in the treatment of Allergic rhinitis.

Ingestion of LP-33(Lactobacillus paracasei 33 )-fortified fermented milk for 30 days can effectively and safely improve the quality of life of patients with allergic rhinitis, and may serve as an alternative treatment for allergic rhinitis.

Lacticaseibacillus paracasei BRAP01 are the dominant strains inducing IFN-γ/IL-10 production in Taiwanese individuals.

Lacticaseibacillus paracasei HB89 mitigates respiratory tract allergies stimulated by PM_{2.5}.

For allergic rhinitis (AR), oral administration of Lactobacillus paracasei (all stored at 4°C before consumption) with more than 10 billion bacteria (1x1010CFU) per day for 8 weeks can improve nasal itching (AR's key clinical features) and reduced secretion of the pro-inflammatory mediator IL-5.

=== Atopic dermatitis, Urticaria ===
Oral administration of L. paracasei KBL382 significantly reduced atopic dermatitis(AD)-associated skin lesions, epidermal thickening, serum levels of immunoglobulin E, and immune cell infiltration.

=== Influenza ===
Oral administration of heat-killed Lactobacillus paracasei MoLac-1 increased the proportion of NK cells in spleen, and ameliorated the symptoms of influenza virus(IFV) infection in mice.

=== Common cold ===
L. paracasei MCC1849 has the potential to improve resistance to common cold infections in susceptible subjects and maintain a desirable mood state, even under mental stress conditions.

=== Coronavirus disease (COVID-19) ===
The Lacticaseibacillus paracasei DG strain significantly induced the expression of genes involved in protective antiviral immunity and prevented the expression of proinflammatory genes triggered by SARS-CoV-2 infection.

=== Inflammatory bowel disease ===
A formulation of live bacteria including Lc. paracasei may be used in combination with conventional therapies to treat ulcerative colitis. Lipoteichoic acid from the cell wall of a heat killed Lacticaseibacillus paracasei D3-5 ameliorates aging-related leaky gut, inflammation and improves physical and cognitive functions in mice

=== Diarrhea ===
Lactobacillus paracasei has been shown to inhibit the bacterial activity of Escherichia coli, a common strain of diarrhea-causing bacteria, so Lactobacillus paracasei is used in the treatment of diarrhea. 。

=== Helicobacter pylori Infection ===
Lacticaseibacillus paracasei showed bacteriostatic and bactericidal activity vs. H. pylori.

=== Irritable bowel syndrome ===
The Lactobacillus paracasei may reduce GI symptom severity and improve the psychological well-being of individuals with certain IBS subtypes.

=== Cancer ===
L. paracasei IMPC2.1 may be a chemoprophylactic in gastrointestinal cells. Gastrointestinal cells are susceptible to apoptosis and cell growth from both heat-killed and viable IMPC2.1 strains.

Lc. paracasei 8700:2 has been isolated from healthy human gastrointestinal mucosa and human feces. Strain 8700:2 was also found to inhibit Salmonella enterica and Helicobacter pylori, two pathogens commonly found in the gastrointestinal tract. Strain 8700:2 breaks down oligofructose and inulin, while also growing rapidly on both and producing lactic acid as the end product.

== Health concerns ==
The manipulation of the gut microbiota is complex and may cause bacteria-host interactions. Although probiotics are considered safe, when they are used by oral administration there is a risk of passage of viable bacteria from the gastrointestinal tract to the internal organs (bacterial translocation) and subsequent bacteremia, which can cause adverse health consequences. Some people, such as those with immune compromise, short bowel syndrome, central venous catheters, cardiac valve disease and premature infants, may be at higher risk for adverse events.

Currently, the probiotic strain, frequency, dose and duration of the probiotic therapy are not established. Live bacteria might not be essential because the beneficial effects of probiotics seem to be mediated by their DNA, and by secreted soluble factors; their therapeutic effects may be obtained by systemic administration rather than orally.

== History ==
LAB (Lactic Acid Bacteria) were classified and grouped in the early 1900s after gaining scientists' attention after observing the bacteria's interactions in different foods, especially dairy products. In 1991, Martinus Beijerinck, a Dutch microbiologist, separated Lactobacillus as gram positive bacteria from the previously known LAB group. L. paracasei has been recently classified as a part of the Lacticaseibacillus casei group of probiotics. The name Lc. paracasei was proposed for rejection in 1996 by Dicks, Duplessis, Dellaglio, and Lauer but subsequent work confirmed the validity of the species.
