= Amylolactobacillus =

Scientific classification
- Domain: Bacteria
- Kingdom: Bacillati
- Phylum: Bacillota
- Class: Bacilli
- Order: Lactobacillales
- Family: Lactobacillaceae
- Genus: Amylolactobacillus; Zheng et al. 2020

Type species
- Amylolactobacillus amylophilus (Nakamura and Crowell 1981) Zheng et al. 2020

Species
- Amylolactobacillus amylophilus (Nakamura and Crowell 1981) Zheng et al. 2020; Amylolactobacillus amylotrophicus (Naser et al. 2006) Zheng et al. 2020

Genus of bacteria

Amylolactobacillus is a genus of lactic acid bacteria.
