= Acetilactobacillus =

Scientific classification
- Domain: Bacteria
- Kingdom: Bacillati
- Phylum: Bacillota
- Class: Bacilli
- Order: Lactobacillales
- Family: Lactobacillaceae
- Genus: Acetilactobacillus; Zheng et al. 2020
- Species: A. jinshanensis

Binomial name
- Acetilactobacillus jinshanensis Zheng et al. 2020

Type strain
- CICC 6269; HSLZ-75 JCM 33270

Synonyms
- "Lactobacillus jinshani" Yu et al. 2020

Species of bacteria

Acetilactobacillus jinshanensis is a species of lactic acid bacteria. It is the only species in the genus Acetilactobacillus.
