= Companilactobacillus kimchii =

Scientific classification
- Domain: Bacteria
- Kingdom: Bacillati
- Phylum: Bacillota
- Class: Bacilli
- Order: Lactobacillales
- Family: Lactobacillaceae
- Genus: Companilactobacillus
- Species: C. kimchii

Binomial name
- Companilactobacillus kimchii (Yoon et al. 2000) Zheng et al. 2020

Synonyms
- Lactobacillus kimchii Yoon et al. 2000

Species of bacterium

Companilactobacillus kimchii is a bacteriocin-producing lactic acid bacterium of the genus Companilactobacillus. It is named for and found in the Korean fermented-vegetable food kimchi.

The cells of C. kimchii are short, slender and rod-shaped. The bacterium is Gram-positive, non-spore-forming and non-motile.
