= Agrilactobacillus =

Scientific classification
- Domain: Bacteria
- Kingdom: Bacillati
- Phylum: Bacillota
- Class: Bacilli
- Order: Lactobacillales
- Family: Lactobacillaceae
- Genus: Agrilactobacillus; Zheng et al. 2020

Type species
- Agrilactobacillus composti (Endo and Okada 2007) Zheng et al. 2020

Species
- Agrilactobacillus composti (Endo and Okada 2007) Zheng et al. 2020; Agrilactobacillus yilanensis (Wei and Gu 2019) Zheng et al. 2020

Genus of bacteria

Agrilactobacillus is a genus of lactic acid bacteria.
