= Paralactobacillus =

Scientific classification
- Domain: Bacteria
- Kingdom: Bacillati
- Phylum: Bacillota
- Class: Bacilli
- Order: Lactobacillales
- Family: Lactobacillaceae
- Genus: Paralactobacillus; Leisner et al. 2000

Species
- "Candidatus Paralactobacillus gallistercoris" Gilroy et al. 2021; Paralactobacillus selangorensis Leisner et al. 2000

Genus of bacteria

Paralactobacillus is a genus of bacteria in the family Lactobacillaceae.
