= Azobenzene reductase =

Class of enzymes

Azobenzene reductase (azoreductase)

Identifiers
- EC no.: 1.7.1.6
- CAS no.: 9029-31-6

Databases
- IntEnz: IntEnz view
- BRENDA: BRENDA entry
- ExPASy: NiceZyme view
- KEGG: KEGG entry
- MetaCyc: metabolic pathway
- PRIAM: profile
- PDB structures: RCSB PDB PDBe PDBsum
- Gene Ontology: AmiGO / QuickGO
Search
- PMC: articles
- PubMed: articles
- NCBI: proteins

Azobenzene reductase also known as azoreductase (EC 1.7.1.6) is an enzyme that catalyzes the chemical reaction:

4-(dimethylamino)azobenzene
+ 2 NADPH
2 H^{+}
2 H^{+}
aniline
+ 2 NADP^{+} +
N,N-dimethylphenylenediamine

The substrates of this enzyme are trans-4-(dimethylamino)azobenzene, two equivalents of reduced nicotinamide adenine dinucleotide phosphate (NADPH), and two protons. Its products are aniline, N,N-dimethylphenylenediamine, and oxidised NADP^{+}.

This enzyme belongs to the family of oxidoreductases, specifically those acting on other nitrogenous compounds as donors with NAD+ or NADP+ as acceptor.

== Mechanism ==
The reaction catalyzed by this enzyme proceeds via a ping-pong mechanism by using 2 equivalents of NAD(P)H to reduce one equivalent of the azo compound substrate (for example methyl red where Ar = p-dimethylaniline and Ar' = o-benzoic acid) into two equivalents of aniline product:

Ar–N=N–Ar' + 2(NAD(P)H + H^{+}) $\rightleftharpoons$ Ar–NH_{2} + NH_{2}–Ar' + 2NAD(P)^{+}

== Substrate specificity ==
Most azoreductase isoenzymes can reduce methyl red, but are not able to reduce sulfonated azo dyes. The unique azoreductase isozyme from Bacillus sp. B29 has the ability to reduce sulfonated azo dyes however.

== Nomenclature ==
The systematic name of this enzyme class is N,N-dimethyl-1,4-phenylenediamine, aniline:NADP+ oxidoreductase. Other names in common use include:

- azo reductase,
- azoreductase,
- azo-dye reductase,
- dibromopropylaminophenylazobenzoic azoreductase,
- dimethylaminobenzene reductase,
- methyl red azoreductase,
- N,N-dimethyl-4-phenylazoaniline azoreductase,
- NAD(P)H:1-(4'-sulfophenylazo)-2-naphthol oxidoreductase,
- NADPH2-dependent azoreductase,
- NADPH2:4-(dimethylamino)azobenzene oxidoreductase,
- NC-reductase,
- new coccinea (NC)-reductase,
- nicotinamide adenine dinucleotide (phosphate) azoreductase,
- orange I azoreductase,
- orange II azoreductase,
- p-aminoazobenzene reductase, and
- p-dimethylaminoazobenzene azoreductase.

== Structural studies ==
As of late 2007, 3 structures have been solved for this class of enzymes, with PDB accession codes 1NNI, 1V4B, and 2D5I. Please check the last updated data on RCSB PDB site.
