= Convivina =

Scientific classification
- Domain: Bacteria
- Kingdom: Bacillati
- Phylum: Bacillota
- Class: Bacilli
- Order: Lactobacillales
- Family: Lactobacillaceae
- Genus: Convivina; Praet et al. 2015

Species
- Convivina intestini Praet et al. 2015; Convivina praedatoris Hettiarachchi et al. 2024

Genus of bacteria

Convivina is a genus of bacteria in the family Lactobacillaceae.
