= Holzapfelia =

Holzapfelia floricola

Scientific classification
- Domain: Bacteria
- Kingdom: Bacillati
- Phylum: Bacillota
- Class: Bacilli
- Order: Lactobacillales
- Family: Lactobacillaceae
- Genus: Holzapfelia; Zheng et al. 2020
- Species: H. floricola

Binomial name
- Holzapfelia floricola (Kawasaki et al. 2011) Zheng et al. 2020

Type strain
- DSM 23037; JCM 16512; NRIC 774; Ryu1-2

Synonyms
- Lactobacillus floricola Kawasaki et al. 2011

Genus of bacteria

Holzapfelia floricola is a species of lactic acid bacteria. It is the only described species in the monotypic genus Holzapfelia.
