= Outgroup (cladistics) =

More distantly related group of organisms

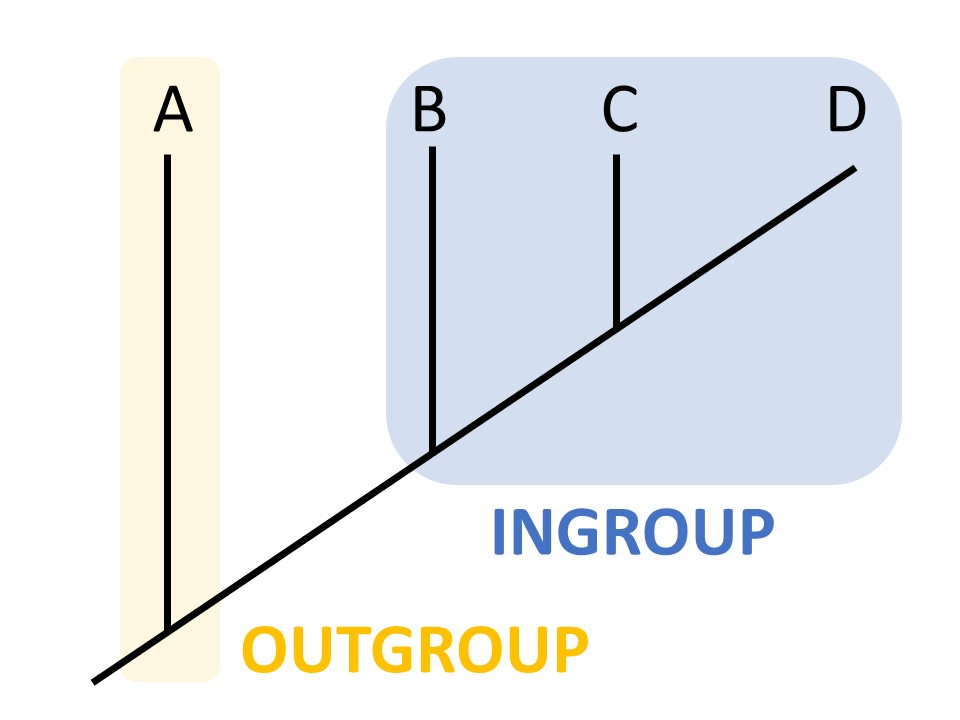
A simple cladogram showing the evolutionary relationships between four species: A, B, C, and D. Here, Species A is the outgroup, and Species B, C, and D form the ingroup.

In cladistics or phylogenetics, an outgroup is a more distantly related group of organisms that serves as a reference group when determining the evolutionary relationships of the ingroup, the set of organisms under study, and is distinct from sociological outgroups. Character states present in the ingroup but absent in the outgroup are often synapomorphies that provide empirical support for the inferred monophyly of the ingroup; character states that are present in the outgroup and some members of the ingroup are symplesiomorphies, and their complementary synapomorphies shared among some members of the ingroup provide hypotheses of relationship within the ingroup clade. The outgroup is used as a point of comparison for the ingroup and allows the phylogeny to be rooted. Because the polarity (direction) of character change can be determined only on a rooted phylogeny, the choice of outgroup is essential for understanding the evolution of traits along a phylogeny.

== History ==
Although the concept of outgroups has been in use from the earliest days of cladistics, the term "outgroup" is thought to have been coined in the early 1970s at the American Museum of Natural History. Prior to the advent of the term, various other terms were used by evolutionary biologists, including "exgroup", "related group", and "outside groups".

== Choice of outgroup ==
The chosen outgroup is hypothesized to be less closely related to the ingroup than the ingroup is related to itself. The evolutionary assumption from these relationships is that the outgroup species has a common ancestor with the ingroup that is older than the common ancestor of the ingroup. Choice of outgroup can change the topology of a phylogeny. Therefore, phylogeneticists typically use more than one outgroup in cladistic analysis. The use of multiple outgroups is preferable because it provides a more robust phylogeny, buffering against poor outgroup candidates. If one outgroup taxon is designated as the root and the others are included simply as additional taxa in the analysis, this provides a test of the ingroup's hypothesized monophyly.

To qualify as an outgroup, a taxon must satisfy the following two characteristics:

- It must not be a member of the ingroup.
- It must be related to the ingroup closely enough so that its characteristics are comparable to those of the ingroup.

Therefore, an appropriate outgroup must be unambiguously outside the clade of interest in the phylogenetic study. An outgroup that is nested within the ingroup will, when used to root the phylogeny, result in incorrect inference of phylogenetic relationships and trait evolution. However, the optimal level of relatedness of the outgroup to the ingroup depends on the depth of phylogenetic analysis. Choosing a closely related outgroup relative to the ingroup is more useful when looking at subtle differences, while choosing an unduly distant outgroup can result in mistaking convergent evolution for a direct evolutionary relationship due to a common ancestor. For shallow phylogenetics—for example, resolving the evolutionary relationships of a clade within a genus—an appropriate outgroup would be a member of the sister clade. However, for deeper phylogenetic analysis, less closely related taxa can be used. For example, Jarvis et al. (2014) used humans and crocodiles as outgroups while resolving the early branches of the avian phylogeny. In molecular phylogenetics, satisfying the second requirement typically means that DNA or protein sequences from the outgroup can be successfully aligned to sequences from the ingroup. Although there are algorithmic approaches to identify the outgroups with maximum global parsimony, they are often limited by failing to reflect the continuous, quantitative nature of certain character states. Character states are traits, either ancestral or derived, that affect the construction of branching patterns in a phylogenetic tree.

== Examples ==
Ingroup	Outgroup
Great Apes	Gibbons
Placental mammals	Marsupials
Chordates	Ambulacrarians
Angiosperms	Gymnosperms

In each example, a phylogeny of organisms in the ingroup may be rooted by scoring the same character states for one or more members of the outgroup.

== See also ==
- Apomorphy, a derived trait (character state) of an organism
- Sister group, a taxon that is more closely related to the group of interest than any other.
- Plesiomorphy, an ancestral trait (character state) of an organism
- Primitive (phylogenetics), a term for ancestral traits; the complement of "derived".
