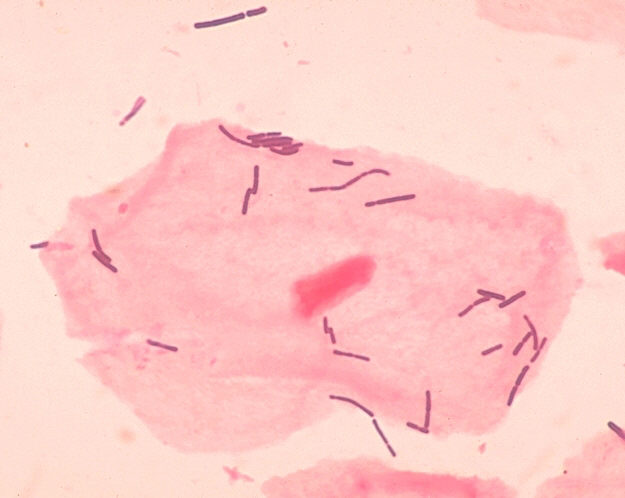
- Lactobacillus near a squamous epithelial cell

Scientific classification
- Domain: Bacteria
- Kingdom: Bacillati
- Phylum: Bacillota
- Class: Bacilli
- Order: Lactobacillales
- Family: Lactobacillaceae; Winslow et al. 1917 (Approved Lists 1980)

Type genus
- Lactobacillus Beijerinck 1901 (Approved Lists 1980)

Synonyms
- "Acidobacteriaceae" Orla-Jesen 1909 non Thrash & Coates 2012; Leuconostocaceae Schleifer 2010

= Lactobacillaceae =

Family of bacteria

The Lactobacillaceae are a family of lactic acid bacteria. It is the only family in the lactic acid bacteria which includes homofermentative and heterofermentative organisms; in the Lactobacillaceae, the pathway used for hexose fermentation is a genus-specific trait. Lactobacillaceae include the homofermentative lactobacilli Lactobacillus, Holzapfelia, Amylolactobacillus, Bombilactobacillus, Companilactobacillus, Lapidilactobacillus, Agrilactobacillus, Schleiferilactobacillus, Loigolactobacillus, Lacticaseibacillus, Latilactobacillus, Dellaglioa, Liquorilactobacillus, Ligilactobacillus, and Lactiplantibacillus; the heterofermentative lactobacilli Furfurilactobacillus, Paucilactobacillus, Limosilactobacillus, Fructilactobacillus, Acetilactobacillus, Apilactobacillus, Levilactobacillus, Secundilactobacillus, and Lentilactobacillus, which were previously classified in the genus Lactobacillus; and the heterofermentative genera Convivina, Fructobacillus, Leuconostoc, Oenococcus, and Weissella which were previously classified in the Leuconostocaceae.

The Lactobacillaceae are also the only family of the lactic acid bacteria which does not include pathogenic or opportunistic pathogenic organisms although some species, particularly Lacticaseibacillus rhamnosus and Weissella spp. can cause rare infections in critically ill patients.

With the exception of Lactococcus lactis, Streptococcus thermophilus and Tetragenococcus halophilus, most food fermenting lactic acid bacteria are now classified in the Lactobacillaceae.

The grandfathered term lactobacilli refers to all bacteria classified in Lactobacillaceae prior to 2020, i.e. Lactobacillus sensu lato (pre-split), Pediococcus, and Sharpea. Some authors use lactobacilli to refer to Lactobacillus sensu lato only.

== Leuconostocaceae ==
At one point five genera (Convivina, Fructobacillus, Leuconostoc, Oenococcus and Weissella) were considered a separate family called Leuconostocaceae. These genera are non-spore-forming, round or elongated in shape, and anaerobic or aerotolerant. They usually inhabit nutrient-rich environments such as milk, meat, vegetable products, and fermented drinks. Lactic acid is the main end product of their characteristic heterofermentative carbohydrate metabolism. In 2020 Leuconostocaceae was synonymized with Lactobacillaceae.

== Phylogeny ==
The currently accepted taxonomy is based on the List of Prokaryotic names with Standing in Nomenclature (LPSN) and National Center for Biotechnology Information (NCBI).

Zheng et al. 2020

- Lactobacillaceae
  - - Loigolactobacillus
    - - - Paralactobacillus
        - Latilactobacillus
      - - Lacticaseibacillus
        - - - Schleiferilactobacillus
            - Agrilactobacillus
          - - Lapidilactobacillus
            - - - Bombilactobacillus
                - Companilactobacillus
              - - Holzapfelia
                - - Lactobacillus
                  - Amylolactobacillus
  - - - Dellaglioa
      - - Ligilactobacillus
        - Liquorilactobacillus
    - - - Pediococcus
        - - - Furfurilactobacillus
            - - Limosilactobacillus
              - Paucilactobacillus
          - - Lactiplantibacillus
            - - - Levilactobacillus
                - Secundilactobacillus
              - - Lentilactobacillus
                - - Fructilactobacillus
                  - - Apilactobacillus
                    - Acetilactobacillus
      - - Weissella
        - - Oenococcus
          - - Leuconostoc
            - - Fructobacillus
              - Convivina

16S rRNA based LTP_10_2024

- - Leuconostocaceae
    - Periweissella
    - - Weissella
      - - Oenococcus
        - - Leuconostoc fallax
          - - Convivina
            - - Fructobacillus
              - Leuconostoc
  - Lactobacillaceae
    - Paralactobacillus
    - - - Dellaglioa
        - - Ligilactobacillus
          - Liquorilactobacillus
      - - - - Schleiferilactobacillus
            - - Holzapfelia
              - Agrilactobacillus
          - - Lapidilactobacillus
            - - - - Xylocopilactobacillus Kawasaki et al. 2024
                  - Bombilactobacillus
                - Companilactobacillus
              - - Amylolactobacillus
                - Lactobacillus
        - - - Loigolactobacillus
            - - Latilactobacillus
              - - Lacticaseibacillus
                - - Furfurilactobacillus
                  - - Paucilactobacillus
                    - Limosilactobacillus
          - - Pediococcus
            - - - Lentilactobacillus
                - - - - Acetilactobacillus
                      - Nicoliella
                    - Fructilactobacillus
                  - - Philodulcilactobacillus
                    - Apilactobacillus
              - - Secundilactobacillus
                  [incl. Levilactobacillus bambusae]
                - - Lactiplantibacillus
                  - Levilactobacillus

120 marker proteins based GTDB 09-RS220

- Lactobacillaceae
  - - Loigolactobacillus Zheng et al. 2020
    - - - Paralactobacillus Leisner et al. 2000
        - - Latilactobacillus Zheng et al. 2020
          - Lacticaseibacillus Zheng et al. 2020
      - - - Schleiferilactobacillus Zheng et al. 2020
          - Agrilactobacillus Zheng et al. 2020
        - - Lapidilactobacillus Zheng et al. 2020
          - - - Bombilactobacillus Zheng et al. 2020
              - Companilactobacillus Zheng et al. 2020
            - - Holzapfelia Deshmukh & Oren 2023
              - - Amylolactobacillus Zheng et al. 2020
                - Lactobacillus Beijerinck 1901
  - - - Dellaglioa Zheng et al. 2020
      - - Liquorilactobacillus Zheng et al. 2020
        - Ligilactobacillus Zheng et al. 2020
    - - - - Limosilactobacillus Zheng et al. 2020
          - Paucilactobacillus Zheng et al. 2020
        - - - "Ca. Gallilactobacillus" Gilroy et al. 2021
            - Furfurilactobacillus Zheng et al. 2020
          - - Periweissella Bello, Rudra & Gupta 2022
            - - Weissella Collins et al. 1994
              - - Oenococcus Dicks, Dellaglio & Collins 1995
                - - - Convivina Praet et al. 2015
                    - Fructobacillus Endo & Okada 2008
                  - Leuconostoc van Tieghem 1878
      - - - Pediococcus Balcke 1884 ex Claussen 1903
          - Lactiplantibacillus Zheng et al. 2020
        - - - - Fructilactobacillus Zheng et al. 2020
              - - - Nicoliella Deshmukh & Oren 2023
                  - - Philodulcilactobacillus Kouya et al. 2023
                    - Acetilactobacillus Zheng et al. 2020
                - Apilactobacillus Zheng et al. 2020
            - Lentilactobacillus Zheng et al. 2020
          - - Secundilactobacillus Zheng et al. 2020
            - Levilactobacillus Zheng et al. 2020

Unassigned genus:

- Eupransor Botero et al. 2024

== See also ==
- List of Bacteria genera
- List of bacterial orders
