= Human microbiome =

Microorganisms in or on human skin and biofluids

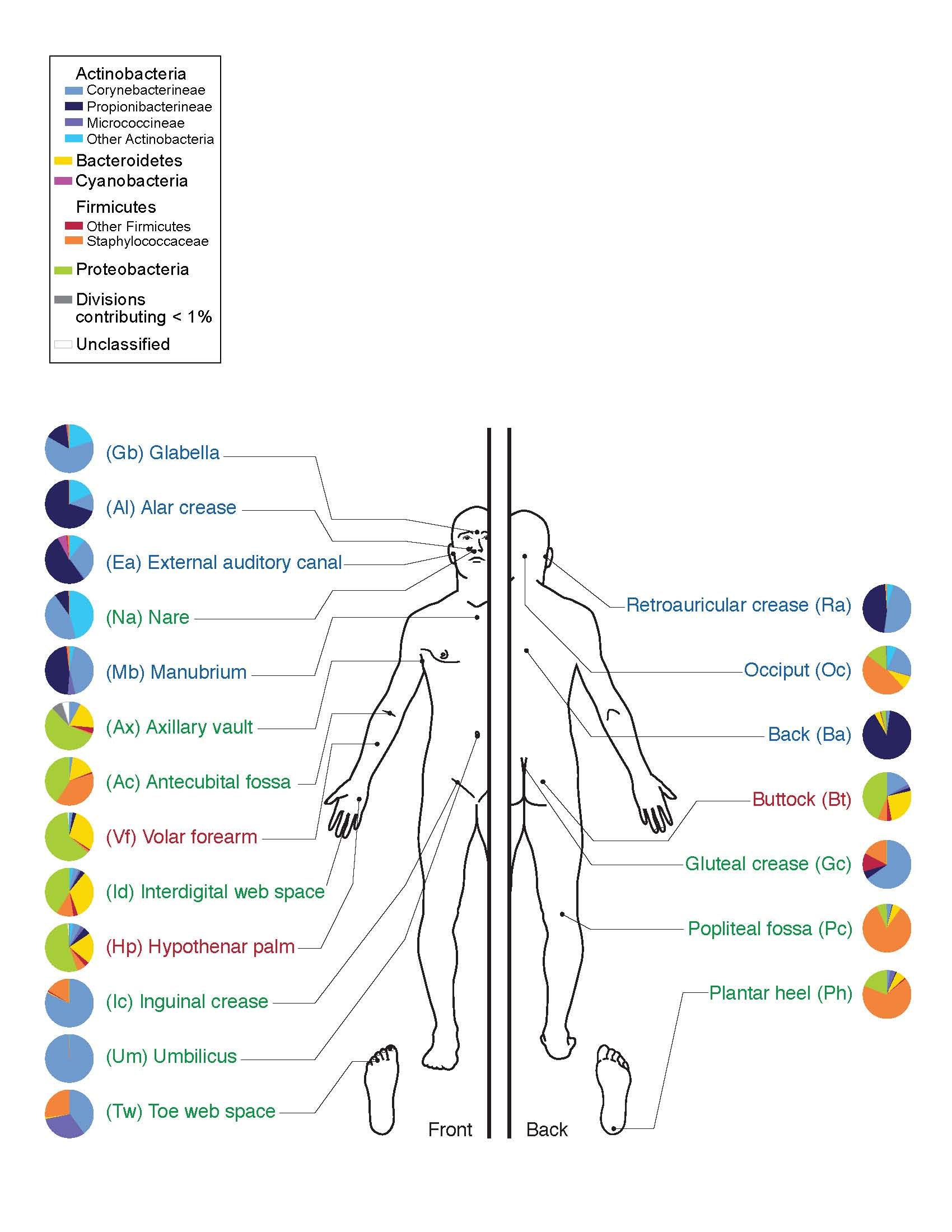
Graphic depicting the human skin microbiota, with relative prevalences of various classes of bacteria

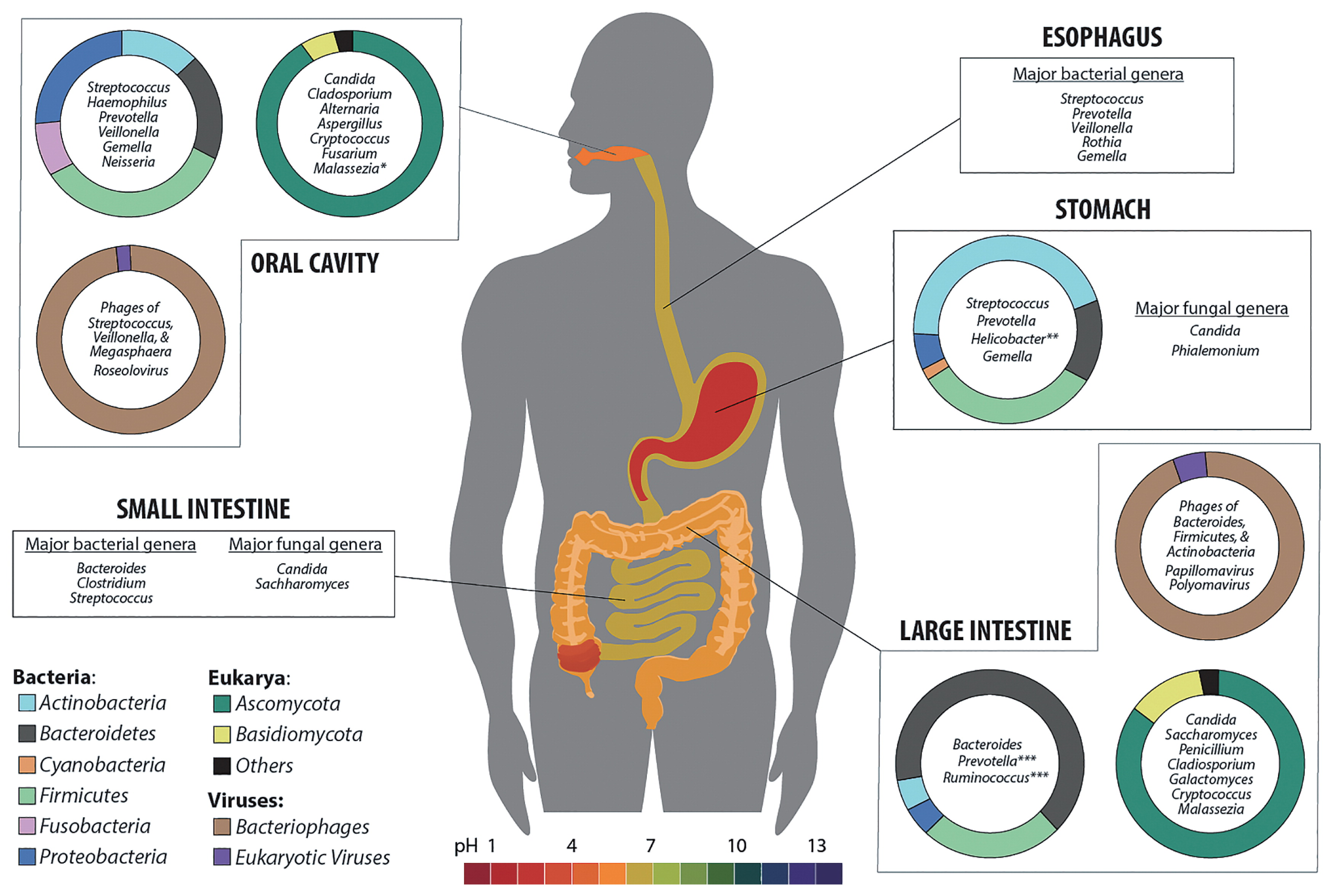
Diagram of human gastrointestinal tract microbiota depicted in various regions

The human microbiome is the aggregate of all microbiota that reside on or within human tissues and biofluids along with the corresponding anatomical sites in which they reside, including the gastrointestinal tract, skin, mammary glands, seminal fluid, uterus, ovarian follicles, lung, saliva, oral mucosa, ocular surface, and the biliary tract. Types of human microbiota include bacteria, archaea, fungi, protists, and viruses. Though micro-animals can also live on the human body, they are typically excluded from this definition. In the context of genomics, the term human microbiome is sometimes used to refer to the collective genomes of resident microorganisms; however, the term human metagenome has the same meaning.

The human body hosts many microorganisms, with approximately the same order of magnitude of non-human cells as human cells. Some microorganisms that humans host are commensal, meaning they co-exist without harming or benefiting humans; others have a mutualistic relationship with their human hosts, where both parties benefit. Conversely, some non-pathogenic microorganisms can harm human hosts via the metabolites they produce, like trimethylamine, which the human body converts to trimethylamine N-oxide via FMO3-mediated oxidation. Certain microorganisms perform tasks that are known to be useful to the human host, but the role of most of them is not well understood. Those that are expected to be present, and that under normal circumstances do not cause disease, are sometimes deemed normal flora or normal microbiota.

The Human Microbiome Project (HMP) took on the project of sequencing the genome of the human microbiota, focusing particularly on the microbiota that normally inhabit the skin, mouth, nose, digestive tract, and vagina. It reached a milestone in 2012 when it published its initial results.

== Terminology ==
Life timeline
← / Earth formed; ← / Earliest water; ← / LUCA; ← / Earliest fossils; ← / Great Oxygenation Event; ← / Sexual reproduction; ← / Earliest fungi; ← / Neoproterozoic oxygenation event; ← / Ediacaran biota; ← / Cambrian explosion; ← / Earliest tetrapods; ← / Earliest hominoid
(million years ago)

Though widely known as flora or microflora, this is a misnomer in technical terms, since the word root flora pertains to plants, and biota refers to the total collection of organisms in a particular ecosystem. Recently, the more appropriate term microbiota is applied, though its use has not eclipsed the entrenched use and recognition of flora with regard to bacteria and other microorganisms. Both terms are being used in different literature.

== Relative numbers ==
The number of bacterial cells in the human body is estimated to be around 38 trillion, while the estimate for human cells is around 30 to 40 trillion. The number of bacterial genes is estimated to be 2 million, 100 times the number of approximately 20,000 human genes.

== Evaluation ==
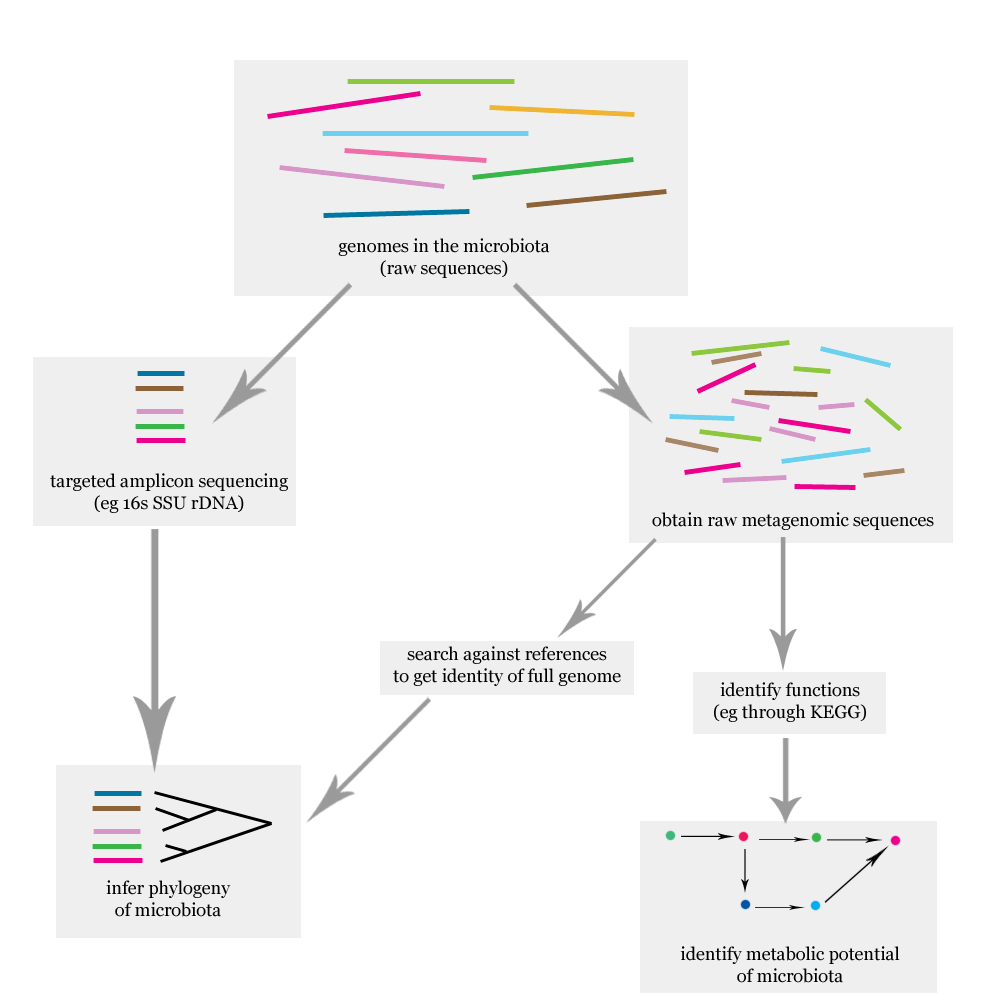
Flowchart illustrating how the human microbiome is studied on the DNA level.

The problem of elucidating the human microbiome is essentially identifying the numerous members of a diverse microbial community, which includes bacteria, eukaryotes, and viruses. This is done primarily using deoxyribonucleic acid (DNA)-based studies, though ribonucleic acid (RNA), protein and metabolite based studies are also performed. DNA-based microbiome studies typically can be categorized as either targeted amplicon studies or, more recently, shotgun metagenomic studies. The former focuses on specific known marker genes and is primarily informative taxonomically, while the latter is an entire metagenomic approach, which can also be used to study the functional potential of the community. One of the challenges that is present in human microbiome studies, but not in other metagenomic studies, is to avoid including the host DNA in the study.

Aside from simply elucidating the composition of the human microbiome, one of the major questions involving the human microbiome is whether there is a "core", that is, whether there is a subset of the community that is shared among most humans. If there is a core, then it would be possible to associate certain community compositions with disease states, which is one of the goals of the HMP. It is known that the human microbiome (such as the gut microbiota) is highly variable both within a single subject and among different individuals, a phenomenon also observed in mice.

On 13 June 2012, a major milestone of the HMP was announced by the National Institutes of Health (NIH) director Francis Collins. The announcement was accompanied with a series of coordinated articles published in Nature and several journals in the Public Library of Science (PLoS) on the same day. By mapping the normal microbial make-up of healthy humans using genome sequencing techniques, the researchers of the HMP have created a reference database and the boundaries of normal microbial variation in humans. From 242 healthy U.S. volunteers, more than 5,000 samples were collected from 15 body sites in men and 18 sites in women, including mouth, nose, skin, lower intestine (stool), and vagina. All the DNA, human and microbial, were analyzed with DNA sequencing machines. The microbial genome data were extracted by identifying the bacterial-specific ribosomal RNA, 16S rRNA. The researchers calculated that more than 10,000 microbial species occupy the human ecosystem, and they have identified 81–99% of the genera.

=== Post-processing analysis ===
Statistical analysis is essential to validate the obtained results (ANOVA can be used to size the differences between the groups); when paired with graphical tools, the outcome is easily visualized and understood.

Once a metagenome is assembled, it is possible to infer the functional potential of the microbiome. The computational challenges for this type of analysis are greater than for single genomes, because metagenome assemblers typically have poorer quality, and many recovered genes are incomplete or fragmented. After the gene identification step, the data can be used to carry out a functional annotation by means of multiple alignment of the target genes against orthologs databases.

=== Marker gene analysis ===
Marker gene analysis is a technique that exploits primers to target a specific genetic region and enables the determination of the microbial phylogenies. The genetic region is characterized by a highly variable region, which can confer detailed identification; it is delimited by conserved regions, which function as binding sites for primers used in PCR. The main gene used to characterize bacteria and archaea is 16S rRNA gene, while fungi identification is based on Internal Transcribed Spacer (ITS). The technique is fast and relatively inexpensive and enables a low-resolution classification of a microbial sample. It is optimal for samples that may be contaminated by host DNA. Primer affinity varies among all DNA sequences, which may result in biases during the amplification reaction. Low-abundance samples are susceptible to overamplification errors, since the other contaminating microorganisms are over-represented with increasing PCR cycles. Optimization of primer selection can help to decrease such errors, although it requires complete knowledge of the microorganisms present in the sample and their relative abundances.

Marker gene analysis can be influenced by the primer choice; in this kind of analysis, it is desirable to use a well-validated protocol (such as the one used in the Earth Microbiome Project). The first step in marker gene amplicon analysis is to remove sequencing errors. Many sequencing platforms are reliable, but most of the apparent sequence diversity is still due to errors during the sequencing process. To reduce this phenomenon, the first approach is to cluster sequences into Operational taxonomic unit (OTUs): this process consolidates similar sequences (a 97% similarity threshold is usually adopted) into a single feature that can be used in further analysis steps. However, this method would discard SNPs because they would get clustered into a single OTU. Another approach is Oligotyping, which includes position-specific information from 16s rRNA sequencing to detect small nucleotide variations and to discriminate between closely related, distinct taxa. These methods give as an output a table of DNA sequences and counts of the different sequences per sample rather than OTU.

Another important step in the analysis is to assign a taxonomic name to microbial sequences in the data. This can be done using machine learning approaches that can reach an accuracy at genus-level of about 80%. Other popular analysis packages provide support for taxonomic classification using exact matches to reference databases and should provide greater specificity, but poor sensitivity. Unclassified microorganism should be further checked for organelle sequences.

=== Phylogenetic analysis ===
Many methods that exploit phylogenetic inference use the 16SRNA gene for Archaea and Bacteria and the 18SRNA gene for Eukaryotes. Phylogenetic comparative methods (PCMs) are based on the comparison of multiple traits among microorganisms, where a higher number of shared traits correlates with closer relationships. Usually, PCMs are coupled with phylogenetic generalized least squares (PGLS) or other statistical analyses to get more significant results. Ancestral state reconstruction is used in microbiome studies to impute trait values for taxa whose traits are unknown. This is commonly performed with PICRUSt, which relies on available databases. Phylogenetic variables are chosen by researchers according to the type of study: through the selection of some variables with significant biological information, it is possible to reduce the dimension of the data to be analysed.

Phylogeny-aware distance is usually performed with UniFrac or similar tools, such as Sørensen's index or Rao's D, to quantify the differences between the different communities. All of these methods are negatively affected by horizontal gene transmission (HGT), since they can generate errors and lead to the correlation of distant species. There are different ways to reduce the negative impact of HGT, including the use of multiple genes or computational tools to assess the probability of putative HGT events.

=== Ecological Network analysis ===
Microbial communities develop in a very complex dynamic that can be viewed and analyzed as an ecosystem. The ecological interactions between microbes govern its change, equilibrium and stability, and can be represented by a population dynamic model. The ongoing study of ecological features of the microbiome is growing rapidly and allows us to understand the fundamental properties of the microbiome. Understanding the underlying rules of microbial communities could help with treating diseases related to unstable microbial communities. A very basic question is whether different humans, who share different microbial communities, have the same underlying microbial dynamics. Increasing evidence supports microbial dynamics as universal. This question is a basic step that will allow scientists to develop treatment strategies, based on the complex dynamics of human microbial communities. There are many important properties on which considerations should be taken into account for developing intervention strategies for controlling the human microbial dynamics, with the goal of decreasing microbially-influenced disease states.

== Types ==
=== Bacteria ===
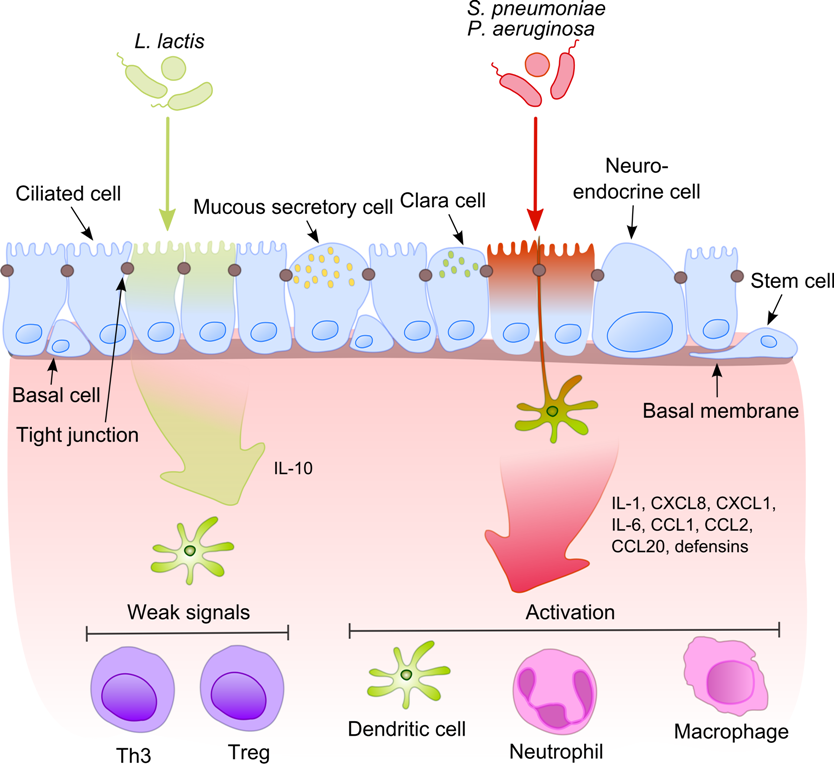
Commensals vs pathogens mechanism, underlying the inflammation in COPD. Airway epithelium has a complex structure, consisting of at least seven diverse cell types interacting with each other by means of tight junctions. Epithelial cells can deliver some signals into the underlying tissues, taking part in the mechanisms of innate and adaptive immune defence, but the key transmitters of these signals are dendritic cells. Once a pathogenic bacterium (e.g., S. pneumoniae, P. aeruginosa) has activated particular pattern recognition receptors on/in epithelial cells, the proinflammatory signaling pathways are activated. This results mainly in IL-1, IL-6 and IL-8 production. These cytokines induce chemotaxis to the site of infection in their target cells (e.g., neutrophils, dendritic cells, and macrophages). On the other hand, representatives of standard microbiota cause only weak signaling, which does not induce inflammation. The mechanism of distinguishing between harmless and harmful bacteria on the molecular as well as on physiological levels is not completely understood.

Populations of microbes (such as bacteria and yeasts) inhabit the skin and mucosal surfaces in various parts of the body. Their role forms part of normal, healthy human physiology, however if microbe numbers grow beyond their typical ranges (often due to a compromised immune system) or if microbes populate (such as through poor hygiene or injury) areas of the body normally not colonized or sterile (such as the blood, or the lower respiratory tract, or the abdominal cavity), disease can result (causing, respectively, bacteremia/sepsis, pneumonia, and peritonitis).

The Human Microbiome Project found that individuals host thousands of bacterial types, with different body sites having their own distinctive communities. Skin and vaginal sites showed smaller diversity than the mouth and gut, these showing the greatest richness. The bacterial makeup for a given site on a body varies from person to person, not only in type, but also in abundance. Bacteria of the same species found throughout the mouth are of multiple subtypes, preferring to inhabit distinctly different locations in the mouth. Even the enterotypes in the human gut, previously thought to be well understood, are from a broad spectrum of communities with blurred taxon boundaries.

It is estimated that 500 to 1,000 species of bacteria live in the human gut, but belong to just a few phyla: Bacillota and Bacteroidota dominate but there are also Pseudomonadota, Verrucomicrobiota, Actinobacteriota, Fusobacteriota, and Cyanobacteria.

Many species of bacteria, primarily Streptococcus mutans and other anaerobes live in the mouth, where they are part of a sticky substance called plaque. If this is not removed by brushing, it hardens into calculus (also called tartar). The same bacteria also secrete acids that dissolve tooth enamel, causing tooth decay.

The vaginal microflora consist mostly of various lactobacillus species. It was long thought that the most common of these species was Lactobacillus acidophilus, but it has later been shown that L. iners is in fact most common, followed by L. crispatus. Other lactobacilli found in the vagina are L. jensenii, L. delbrueckii and L. gasseri. Disturbance of the vaginal flora can lead to infections such as bacterial vaginosis and candidiasis.

=== Archaea ===
Archaea are present in the human gut, but, in contrast to the enormous variety of bacteria in this organ, the numbers of archaeal species are much more limited. The dominant group are the methanogens, particularly Methanobrevibacter smithii and Methanosphaera stadtmanae. However, colonization by methanogens is variable, and only about 50% of humans have easily detectable populations of these organisms.

As of 2007, no clear examples of archaeal pathogens were known, although a relationship has been proposed between the presence of some methanogens and human periodontal disease. Methane-dominant small intestinal bacterial overgrowth (SIBO) is also predominantly caused by methanogens, and Methanobrevibacter smithii in particular.

=== Fungi ===
Fungi, in particular yeasts, are present in the human gut. The best-studied of these are Candida species due to their ability to become pathogenic in immunocompromised and even in healthy hosts. Yeasts are also present on the skin, such as Malassezia species, where they consume oils secreted from the sebaceous glands.

=== Viruses ===
Viruses, especially bacterial viruses (bacteriophages), colonize various body sites. These colonized sites include the skin, gut, lungs, and oral cavity. Virus communities have been associated with some diseases, and do not simply reflect the bacterial communities.

In January 2024, biologists reported the discovery of "obelisks", a new class of viroid-like elements, and "oblins", their related group of proteins, in the human microbiome.

=== Amoebas ===
A number of species of non-pathogenic amoebas are known to live in the human gastrointestinal tract as commensals, including Endolimax nana, several species of the genus Entamoeba (particularly Entamoeba coli, E. hartmanni and E. polecki), and the species Iodamoeba buetschlii.

== Anatomical areas ==
=== Skin ===
A study of 20 skin sites on each of ten healthy humans found 205 identified genera in 19 bacterial phyla, with most sequences assigned to four phyla: Actinomycetota (51.8%), Bacillota (24.4%), Pseudomonadota (16.5%), and Bacteroidota (6.3%). A large number of fungal genera are present on healthy human skin, with some variability by region of the body; however, during pathological conditions, certain genera tend to dominate in the affected region. For example, Malassezia is dominant in atopic dermatitis and Acremonium is dominant on dandruff-affected scalps.

The skin acts as a barrier to deter the invasion of pathogenic microbes. The human skin contains microbes that reside either in or on the skin and can be residential or transient. Resident microorganism types vary in relation to skin type on the human body. A majority of microbes reside on superficial cells on the skin or prefer to associate with glands. These glands, such as oil or sweat glands, provide the microbes with water, amino acids, and fatty acids. In addition, resident bacteria associated with oil glands are often Gram-positive and can be pathogenic.

=== Conjunctiva ===
A small number of bacteria and fungi are normally present in the conjunctiva. Classes of bacteria include Gram-positive cocci (e.g., Staphylococcus and Streptococcus) and Gram-negative rods and cocci (e.g., Haemophilus and Neisseria) are present. Fungal genera include Candida, Aspergillus, and Penicillium. The lachrymal glands continuously secrete, keeping the conjunctiva moist, while intermittent blinking lubricates the conjunctiva and washes away foreign material. Tears contain bactericides such as lysozyme, so that microorganisms have difficulty in surviving the lysozyme and settling on the epithelial surfaces.

=== Gastrointestinal tract ===
Tryptophan metabolism by human gut microbiota ()
This diagram shows the biosynthesis of bioactive compounds (indole and certain other derivatives) from tryptophan by bacteria in the gut. Indole is produced from tryptophan by bacteria that express tryptophanase. Clostridium sporogenes metabolizes tryptophan into indole and subsequently 3-indolepropionic acid (IPA), a highly potent neuroprotective antioxidant that scavenges hydroxyl radicals. IPA binds to the pregnane X receptor (PXR) in intestinal cells, thereby facilitating mucosal homeostasis and barrier function. Following absorption from the intestine and distribution to the brain, IPA confers a neuroprotective effect against cerebral ischemia and Alzheimer's disease. Lactobacillaceae (Lactobacillus s.l.) species metabolize tryptophan into indole-3-aldehyde (I3A) which acts on the aryl hydrocarbon receptor (AhR) in intestinal immune cells, in turn increasing interleukin 22 (IL-22) production. Indole itself triggers the secretion of glucagon-like peptide-1 (GLP-1) in intestinal L cells and acts as a ligand for AhR. Indole can also be metabolized by the liver into indoxyl sulfate, a compound that is toxic in high concentrations and associated with vascular disease and renal dysfunction. AST-120 (activated charcoal), an intestinal sorbent that is taken by mouth, adsorbs indole, in turn decreasing the concentration of indoxyl sulfate in blood plasma.

In humans, the composition of the infant gastrointestinal microbiome is established during birth, maturing to the adult microbiome within the first few years. Birth by Cesarean section or vaginal delivery also influences the gut's microbial composition. Babies born through the vaginal canal have non-pathogenic, beneficial gut microbiota similar to those found in the mother. However, the gut microbiota of babies delivered by C-section harbor more pathogenic bacteria such as Escherichia coli and Staphylococcus and require more time to develop non-pathogenic, beneficial gut microbiota.

The relationship between some gut microbiota and humans is not merely commensal (a non-harmful coexistence), but rather a mutualistic relationship. Some human gut microorganisms benefit the host by fermenting dietary fiber into short-chain fatty acids (SCFAs), such as acetic acid and butyric acid, which are then absorbed by the host. Intestinal bacteria also play a role in synthesizing B vitamins and vitamin K as well as metabolizing bile acids, sterols, and xenobiotics. The systemic importance of the SCFAs and other compounds they produce are like hormones and the gut flora itself appears to function like an endocrine organ, and dysregulation of the gut flora has been correlated with a host of inflammatory and autoimmune conditions.

The composition of human gut microbiota changes over time, when the diet changes, and as overall health changes. A systematic review of 15 human randomized controlled trials from July 2016 found that certain commercially available strains of probiotic bacteria from the Bifidobacterium and Lactobacillus genera (B. longum, B. breve, B. infantis, L. helveticus, L. rhamnosus, L. plantarum, and L. casei), when taken by mouth in daily doses of 10^{9}–10^{10} colony forming units (CFU) for 1–2 months, possess treatment efficacy (i.e., improves behavioral outcomes) in certain central nervous system disorders – including anxiety, depression, autism spectrum disorder, and obsessive–compulsive disorder – and improves certain aspects of memory.

==== Esophagus ====
While the esophagus was previously considered to lack a microbiome, since the 1980s it has been known to contain a diverse microbiome. However, it is poorly studied with little known about its role in disease pathogenesis and esophageal health. This is partially due to the difficulty in sampling the microbes in the esophagus. Many bacteria can be found here such as Firmicutes (Streptococcus, Veillonella, Megasphaera, Granulicatella, Gemella, Clostridium, and Bulleidia), Bacteroidetes (Prevotella and Bacteroides), Fusobacteria, Actinobacteria (Rothia and Actinomyces), and Saccharibacteria. The most abundant species found was Streptococcus mitis. In a healthy esophagus, it is dominated by gram-positive bacteria such as Streptococcus.

=== Urethra and bladder ===
The genitourinary system appears to have a microbiota, which is an unexpected finding in light of the long-standing use of standard clinical microbiological culture methods to detect bacteria in urine when people show signs of a urinary tract infection; it is common for these tests to show no bacteria present. It appears that common culture methods do not detect many kinds of bacteria and other microorganisms that are normally present. As of 2017, sequencing methods were used to identify these microorganisms to determine if there are differences in microbiota between people with urinary tract problems and those who are healthy. To properly assess the microbiome of the bladder as opposed to the genitourinary system, the urine specimen should be collected directly from the bladder, which is often done with a catheter.

=== Vagina ===
Vaginal microbiota refers to those species and genera that colonize the vagina. These organisms play an important role in protecting against infections and maintaining vaginal health. The most abundant vaginal microorganisms found in premenopausal women are from the genus Lactobacillus, which suppress pathogens by producing hydrogen peroxide and lactic acid. Bacterial species composition and ratios vary depending on the stage of the menstrual cycle. Ethnicity also influences vaginal flora. The occurrence of hydrogen peroxide-producing lactobacilli is lower in African American women and vaginal pH is higher. Other influential factors such as sexual intercourse and antibiotics have been linked to the loss of lactobacilli. Moreover, studies have found that sexual intercourse with a condom does appear to change lactobacilli levels, and does increase the level of Escherichia coli within the vaginal flora. Changes in the normal, healthy vaginal microbiota is an indication of infections, such as candidiasis or bacterial vaginosis. Candida albicans inhibits the growth of Lactobacillus species, while Lactobacillus species which produce hydrogen peroxide inhibit the growth and virulence of Candida albicans in both the vagina and the gut.

Fungal genera that have been detected in the vagina include Candida, Pichia, Eurotium, Alternaria, Rhodotorula, and Cladosporium, among others.

=== Placenta ===
Until recently the placenta was considered to be a sterile organ but commensal, nonpathogenic bacterial species and genera have been identified that reside in the placental tissue. However, the existence of a microbiome in the placenta is controversial as criticized in several researches. The so-called "placental microbiome" is likely derived from contamination of reagents because low-biomass samples are easily contaminated.

=== Uterus ===
Until recently, the upper reproductive tract of women was considered to be a sterile environment. A variety of microorganisms inhabit the uterus of healthy, asymptomatic women of reproductive age. The microbiome of the uterus differs significantly from that of the vagina and gastrointestinal tract.

=== Oral cavity ===
The environment present in the human mouth allows the growth of characteristic microorganisms found there. It provides a source of water and nutrients, as well as a moderate temperature. Resident microbes of the mouth adhere to the teeth and gums to resist mechanical flushing from the mouth to stomach where acid-sensitive microbes are destroyed by hydrochloric acid.

Anaerobic bacteria in the oral cavity include: Actinomyces, Arachnia, Bacteroides, Bifidobacterium, Eubacterium, Fusobacterium, Lactobacillus, Leptotrichia, Peptococcus, Peptostreptococcus, Propionibacterium, Selenomonas, Treponema, and Veillonella. Genera of fungi that are frequently found in the mouth include Candida, Cladosporium, Aspergillus, Fusarium, Glomus, Alternaria, Penicillium, and Cryptococcus, among others.

Bacteria accumulate on both the hard and soft oral tissues in biofilm allowing them to adhere and strive in the oral environment while protected from the environmental factors and antimicrobial agents. Saliva plays a key biofilm homeostatic role allowing recolonization of bacteria for formation and controlling growth by detaching biofilm buildup. It also provides a means of nutrients and temperature regulation. The location of the biofilm determines the type of exposed nutrients it receives.

Oral bacteria have evolved mechanisms to sense their environment and evade or modify the host. However, a highly efficient innate host defense system constantly monitors bacterial colonization to prevent bacterial invasion of local tissues. A dynamic equilibrium exists between dental plaque bacteria and the innate host defense system.

This dynamic between host oral cavity and oral microbes plays a key role in health and disease, as it provides entry into the body. A healthy equilibrium presents a symbiotic relationship where oral microbes limit growth and adherence of pathogens while the host provides an environment for them to flourish. Ecological changes such as change of immune status, shift of resident microbes and nutrient availability shift from a mutual to parasitic relationship resulting in the host being prone to oral and systemic disease. Systemic diseases such as diabetes and cardiovascular diseases has been correlated to poor oral health. Of particular interest is the role of oral microorganisms in the two major dental diseases: dental caries and periodontal disease. Pathogen colonization at the periodontium cause an excessive immune response resulting in a periodontal pocket- a deepened space between the tooth and gingiva. This acts as a protected blood-rich reservoir with nutrients for anaerobic pathogens. Systemic disease at various sites of the body can result from oral microbes entering the blood by passing through diseased tissue at periodontal pockets and oral membranes.

Persistent proper oral hygiene is the primary method for preventing oral and systemic disease. It reduces the density of biofilm and overgrowth of potential pathogenic bacteria that cause disease. However, proper oral hygiene may not be enough as the oral microbiome, genetics, and changes to immune response play a factor in developing chronic infections. Use of antibiotics could treat already spreading infection, but is ineffective against bacteria within biofilms.

=== Nasal cavity ===
Staphylococcus aureus is a major pathogenic species in the nasal cavity.

=== Lung ===
Much like the oral cavity, the upper and lower respiratory system possess mechanical deterrents to remove microbes. Goblet cells produce mucus which traps microbes and moves them out of the respiratory system via continuously moving ciliated epithelial cells. In addition, a bactericidal effect is generated by nasal mucus which contains the enzyme lysozyme. The upper and lower respiratory tract appears to have its own set of microbiota. Pulmonary bacterial microbiota belong to 9 major bacterial genera: Prevotella, Sphingomonas, Pseudomonas, Acinetobacter, Fusobacterium, Megasphaera, Veillonella, Staphylococcus, and Streptococcus. Some of the bacteria considered "normal biota" in the respiratory tract can cause serious disease especially in immunocompromised individuals; these include Streptococcus pyogenes, Haemophilus influenzae, Streptococcus pneumoniae, Neisseria meningitidis, and Staphylococcus aureus. Fungal genera that compose the pulmonary mycobiome include Candida, Malassezia, Neosartorya, Saccharomyces, and Aspergillus, among others.

Unusual distributions of bacterial and fungal genera in the respiratory tract is observed in people with cystic fibrosis. Their bacterial flora often contains antibiotic-resistant and slow-growing bacteria, and the frequency of these pathogens changes in relation to age.

=== Biliary tract ===
Traditionally, the biliary tract had been considered to be normally sterile, and the presence of microorganisms in bile is a marker of pathological process. This assumption was confirmed by failure in allocation of bacterial strains from the normal bile duct. Papers began emerging in 2013 showing that the normal biliary microbiota is a separate functional layer that protects the biliary tract from colonization by exogenous microorganisms.

=== Blood ===
The presence of viable bacteria in the bloodstream can provoke strong immune activation, resulting in clinical syndromes ranging from relatively mild forms of bacteremia to the potentially life-threatening condition known as sepsis. Bacteremia may occur spontaneously or as a complication of medical procedures, including liver transplantation.

Even in the absence of live microorganisms, bacterial breakdown products, particularly fragments of microbial DNA, can enter the circulation and persist transiently until cleared by renal filtration or enzymatic degradation. This observation has led to the concept of a blood microbiome, which primarily reflects circulating microbial DNA rather than intact, viable bacteria.

The precise mechanisms by which microbial DNA enters the bloodstream remain incompletely understood, though translocation from the gastrointestinal tract is considered a major source, particularly in the setting of impaired intestinal barrier function, a feature observed in several chronic inflammatory diseases.

Blood-derived microbial DNA signatures have been explored as potential non-invasive biomarkers for a variety of conditions, including diabetes, cardiovascular disease, and cancer. Some studies suggest that such signatures may even differentiate between cancer types.

Despite growing interest, the existence and biological relevance of a distinct blood microbiome remain debated. Major concerns include technical limitations in sequencing and bioinformatic analysis, as well as the high risk of contamination and analytical artifacts.

To address these uncertainties, rigorously controlled, prospective, and multinational proof-of-concept studies have been proposed to determine how representative circulating microbial DNA is of the overall human microbiome.

== Disease and death ==
Human bodies rely on the innumerable bacterial genes as the source of essential nutrients. Both metagenomic and epidemiological studies indicate vital roles for the human microbiome in preventing a wide range of diseases, from type 2 diabetes and obesity to inflammatory bowel disease, Parkinson's disease, and even mental health conditions like depression. A symbiotic relationship between the gut microbiota and different bacteria may influence an individual's immune response. Metabolites generated by gut microbes appear to be causative factors in type 2 diabetes. Although in its infancy, microbiome-based treatment is also showing promise, most notably for treating drug-resistant C. difficile infection and in diabetes treatment.

=== Clostridioides difficile infection ===
An overwhelming presence of the bacteria, C. difficile, leads to an infection of the gastrointestinal tract, normally associated to dysbiosis with the microbiota believed to have been caused by the administration of antibiotics. Use of antibiotics eradicates the beneficial gut flora within the gastrointestinal tract, which normally prevents pathogenic bacteria from establishing dominance. Traditional treatment for C. difficile infections includes an additional regime of antibiotics, however, efficacy rates average between 20 and 30%. Recognizing the importance of healthy gut bacteria, researchers turned to a procedure known as fecal microbiota transplant (FMT), where patients experiencing gastrointestinal diseases, such as C. difficile infection (CDI), receive fecal content from a healthy individual in hopes of restoring a normal functioning intestinal microbiota. Fecal microbiota transplant is approximately 85–90% effective in people with CDI for whom antibiotics have not worked or in whom the disease recurs following antibiotics. Most people with CDI recover with one FMT treatment.

=== Cancer ===
Although cancer is generally a disease of host genetics and environmental factors, microorganisms are implicated in some 20% of human cancers. Particularly for potential factors in colon cancer, bacterial density is one million times higher than in the small intestine, and approximately 12-fold more cancers occur in the colon compared to the small intestine, possibly establishing a pathogenic role for microbiota in colon and rectal cancers. Microbial density may be used as a prognostic tool in assessment of colorectal cancers.

The microbiota may affect carcinogenesis in three broad ways: (i) altering the balance of tumor cell proliferation and death, (ii) regulating immune system function, and (iii) influencing metabolism of host-produced factors, foods and pharmaceuticals. Tumors arising at boundary surfaces, such as the skin, oropharynx and respiratory, digestive and urogenital tracts, harbor a microbiota. Substantial microbe presence at a tumor site does not establish association or causal links. Instead, microbes may find tumor oxygen tension or nutrient profile supportive. Decreased populations of specific microbes or induced oxidative stress may also increase risks. Of the around 10^{30} microbes on earth, ten are designated by the International Agency for Research on Cancer as human carcinogens. Microbes may secrete proteins or other factors directly drive cell proliferation in the host, or may up- or down-regulate the host immune system including driving acute or chronic inflammation in ways that contribute to carcinogenesis.

Concerning the relationship of immune function and development of inflammation, mucosal surface barriers are subject to environmental risks and must rapidly repair to maintain homeostasis. Compromised host or microbiota resiliency also reduce resistance to malignancy, possibly inducing inflammation and cancer. Once barriers are breached, microbes can elicit proinflammatory or immunosuppressive programs through various pathways. For example, cancer-associated microbes appear to activate NF-κΒ signaling within the tumor microenvironment. Other pattern recognition receptors, such as nucleotide-binding oligomerization domain–like receptor (NLR) family members NOD-2, NLRP3, NLRP6 and NLRP12, may play a role in mediating colorectal cancer. Likewise Helicobacter pylori appears to increase the risk of gastric cancer, due to its driving a chronic inflammatory response in the stomach.

=== Inflammatory bowel disease ===
Inflammatory bowel disease consists of two different diseases: ulcerative colitis and Crohn's disease and both of these diseases present with disruptions in the gut microbiota (also known as dysbiosis). This dysbiosis presents itself in the form of decreased microbial diversity in the gut, and is correlated to defects in host genes that changes the innate immune response in individuals.

=== Disorders of the gut-brain interaction ===
In patients with Irritable bowel syndrome and other functional gastrointestinal disorders like abdominal bloating, studies have noted alterations in the abundance of specific bacterial groups. In particular, decreased levels of beneficial bacteria like Bifidobacterium and Lactobacillus; increased levels of potentially harmful bacteria like Bacteroides and Proteobacteria. These microbial alterations can contribute to: increased intestinal permeability ("leaky gut"), visceral hypersensitivity (increased sensitivity of the gut to stimuli), altered gut motility, immune system activation.

=== Disorders of the gut–skin interaction ===
A relationship between microorganisms residing in the gastrointestinal tract and skin health has long been proposed. As early as the early 20th century, the oral consumption of baker's yeast (Saccharomyces cerevisiae) was commercially promoted as a treatment for acne.

Subsequent scientific studies have provided evidence supporting a gut microbiome–skin connection. In patients with psoriasis, depletion of Saccharomyces cerevisiae has been observed and shown to be reversible following treatment with dimethyl fumarate, suggesting a role for gut-associated fungi in disease modulation.

Alterations in the gut microbiome have also been reported in other inflammatory skin diseases. For example, changes in gut microbial composition correlate with disease activity in hidradenitis suppurativa, supporting the concept of a microbiome-mediated gut–skin axis.

The gut–skin relationship is further illustrated by extra-intestinal manifestations of chronic inflammatory bowel diseases such as ulcerative colitis and Crohn's disease. In these conditions, gut microbiome alterations and particularly depletion of the anti-inflammatory bacterium Faecalibacterium prausnitzii have been shown to parallel inflammatory skin disorders, including psoriasis.

Together, these observations support the concept of a bidirectional, microbiota-driven gut–skin axis. This framework challenges the traditional view of the gut and skin as independent organ systems and suggests new opportunities for understanding disease mechanisms and developing therapeutic strategies that target microbial ecosystems to improve both gastrointestinal and cutaneous health.

=== Human immunodeficiency virus ===
The HIV disease progression influences the composition and function of the gut microbiota, with notable differences between HIV-negative, HIV-positive, and post-ART HIV-positive populations. HIV decreases the integrity of the gut epithelial barrier function by affecting tight junctions. This breakdown allows for translocation across the gut epithelium, which is thought to contribute to increases in inflammation seen in people with HIV.

Vaginal microbiota plays a role in the infectivity of HIV, with an increased risk of infection and transmission when the woman has bacterial vaginosis, a condition characterized by an abnormal balance of vaginal bacteria. The enhanced infectivity is seen with the increase in pro-inflammatory cytokines and CCR5 + CD4+ cells in the vagina. However, a decrease in infectivity is seen with increased levels of vaginal Lactobacillus, which promotes an anti-inflammatory condition.

=== Gut microbiome of centenarians ===
Humans who are 100 years old or older, called centenarians, have a distinct gut microbiome. This microbiome is characteristically enriched in microorganisms that are able to synthesize novel secondary bile acids. These secondary bile acids include various isoforms of lithocholic acid that may contribute to healthy aging.

=== Death ===
With death, the microbiome of the living body collapses and a different composition of microorganisms named necrobiome establishes itself as an important active constituent of the complex physical decomposition process. Its predictable changes over time are thought to be useful to help determine the time of death.

== Environmental health ==
Studies in 2009 questioned whether the decline in biota (including microfauna) as a result of human intervention might impede human health, hospital safety procedures, food product design, and treatments of disease.

== Changes, modulation and transmission ==
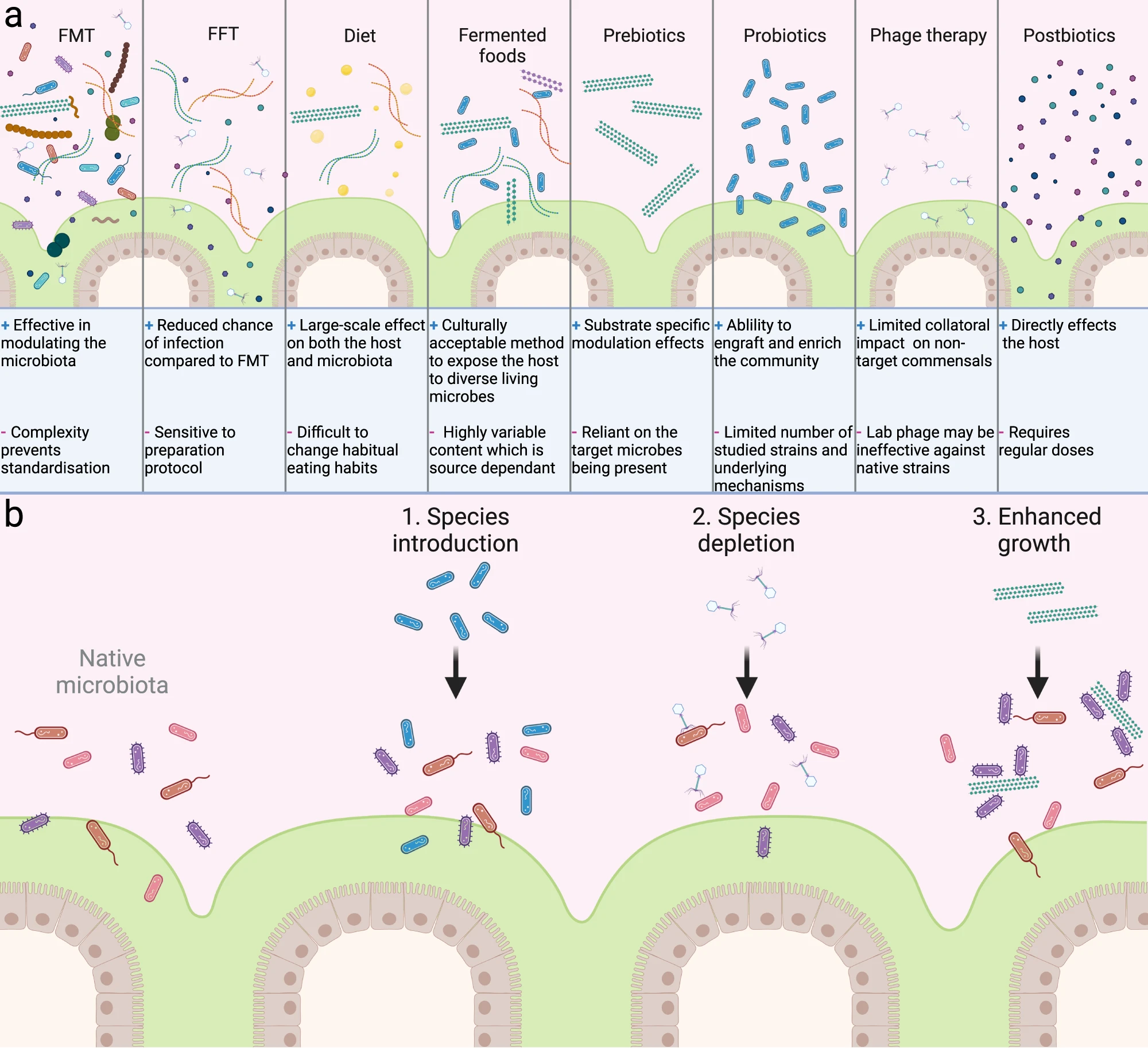
Microbiome-based interventions to modulate gut ecology and the immune system

Hygiene, probiotics, prebiotics, synbiotics, light therapy, microbiota transplants (fecal or skin), antibiotics, exercise, diet, breastfeeding, aging can change the human microbiome across various anatomical systems or regions such as skin and gut.

=== Person-to-person transmission ===
The human microbiome is transmitted between a mother and her children, as well as between people living in the same household.

== Research ==
=== Migration ===
Primary research indicates that immediate changes in the microbiota may occur when a person migrates from one country to another, such as when Thai immigrants settled in the United States or when Latin Americans immigrated into the United States. Losses of microbiota diversity were greater in obese individuals and children of immigrants.

=== Cellulose digestion ===
A 2024 study suggests that gut microbiota capable of digesting cellulose can be found in the human microbiome, and they are less abundant in people living in industrialized societies.

=== Sexome ===
The sexome refers to microbes left on genitalia after penetrative sex. In the context of forensic science, the sexome can potentially aid in sexual assault casework for perpetrator identification when human male DNA is absent.

== See also ==
- Human Microbiome Project
- Human milk microbiome
- Human virome
- Hygiene hypothesis
- Initial acquisition of microbiota
- Microbiome
- Microbiome Immunity Project
- Microorganism

== Bibliography ==
- Ed Yong. I Contain Multitudes: The Microbes Within Us and a Grander View of Life. 368 pages, Published 9 August 2016 by Ecco, ISBN 0062368591.
