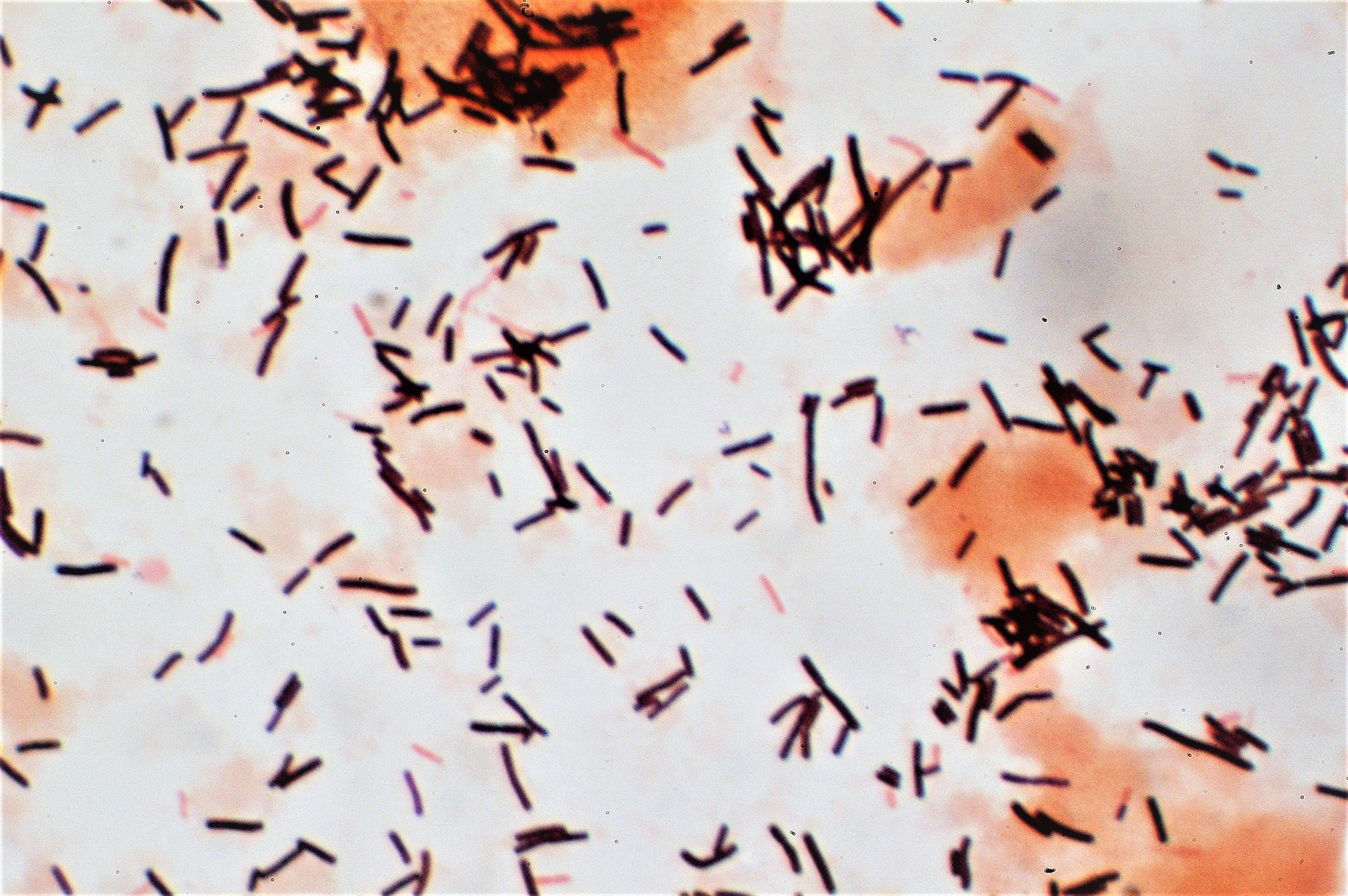
- Lactobacillus acidophilus Gram stain

Scientific classification
- Domain: Bacteria
- Kingdom: Bacillati
- Phylum: Bacillota
- Class: Bacilli
- Order: Lactobacillales
- Family: Lactobacillaceae
- Genus: Lactobacillus
- Species: L. acidophilus

Binomial name
- Lactobacillus acidophilus (Moro 1900) Hansen & Mocquot 1970

= Lactobacillus acidophilus =

Species of bacterium

Lactobacillus acidophilus (Neo-Latin 'acid-loving milk-bacillus') is a rod-shaped, Gram-positive, homofermentative, anaerobic microbe first isolated from infant feces in the year 1900. The species is commonly found in humans, specifically the gastrointestinal tract and oral cavity as well as some speciality fermented foods such as fermented milk or yogurt, though it is not the most common species for this. The species most readily grows at low pH levels (below 5.0), and has an optimum growth temperature of 37 °C. Certain strains of L. acidophilus show strong probiotic effects, and are commercially used in dairy production. The genome of L. acidophilus has been sequenced.

L. acidophilus has antagonistic effects on the growth of Staphylococcus aureus, Escherichia coli, Salmonella typhimurium, and Clostridium perfringens. Out of the four organisms, Staphylococcus aureus is the most affected. Along with S. aureus, the other Gram-positive bacteria, C. perfringens, was affected more by L. acidophilus, than the two other bacteria that are Gram-negative. L. acidophilus is found to also reduce oral plaque formation by Streptococcus mutans.

== History ==
Lactobacillus acidophilus was first isolated from the human gastrointestinal tract in 1900 by Ernst Moro with the original name Bacillus acidophilus. Over time, there have been many changes to the methods for characterizing taxonomy of organisms, leading to the genus distinction of Lactobacillus in 1929. Complication around finding the original strain arose when multiple strains of a single isolate were given a variety of names. Most studies on L. acidophilus was focused on one particular strain, Lactobacillus acidophilus NCFM. With the large amount of information discovered about L. acidophilus NCFM, the US Food and Drug Administration has adjudged the microbe to be an approved ingredient in beverages, dairy products, and other probiotic foods.

== Biological and biochemical features ==
=== Morphology ===
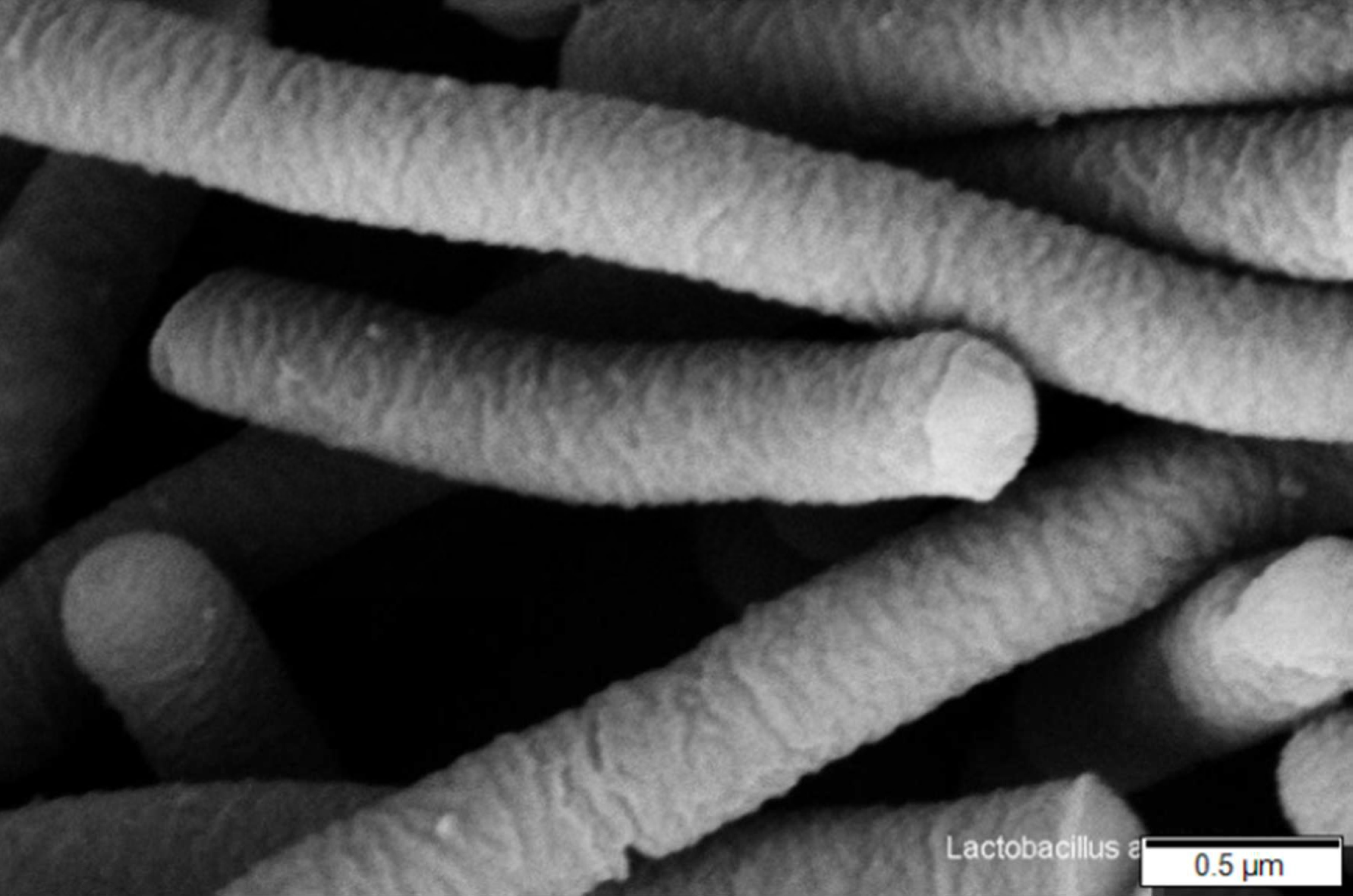
Lactobacillus acidophilus image taken with a scanning electron microscope (SEM).

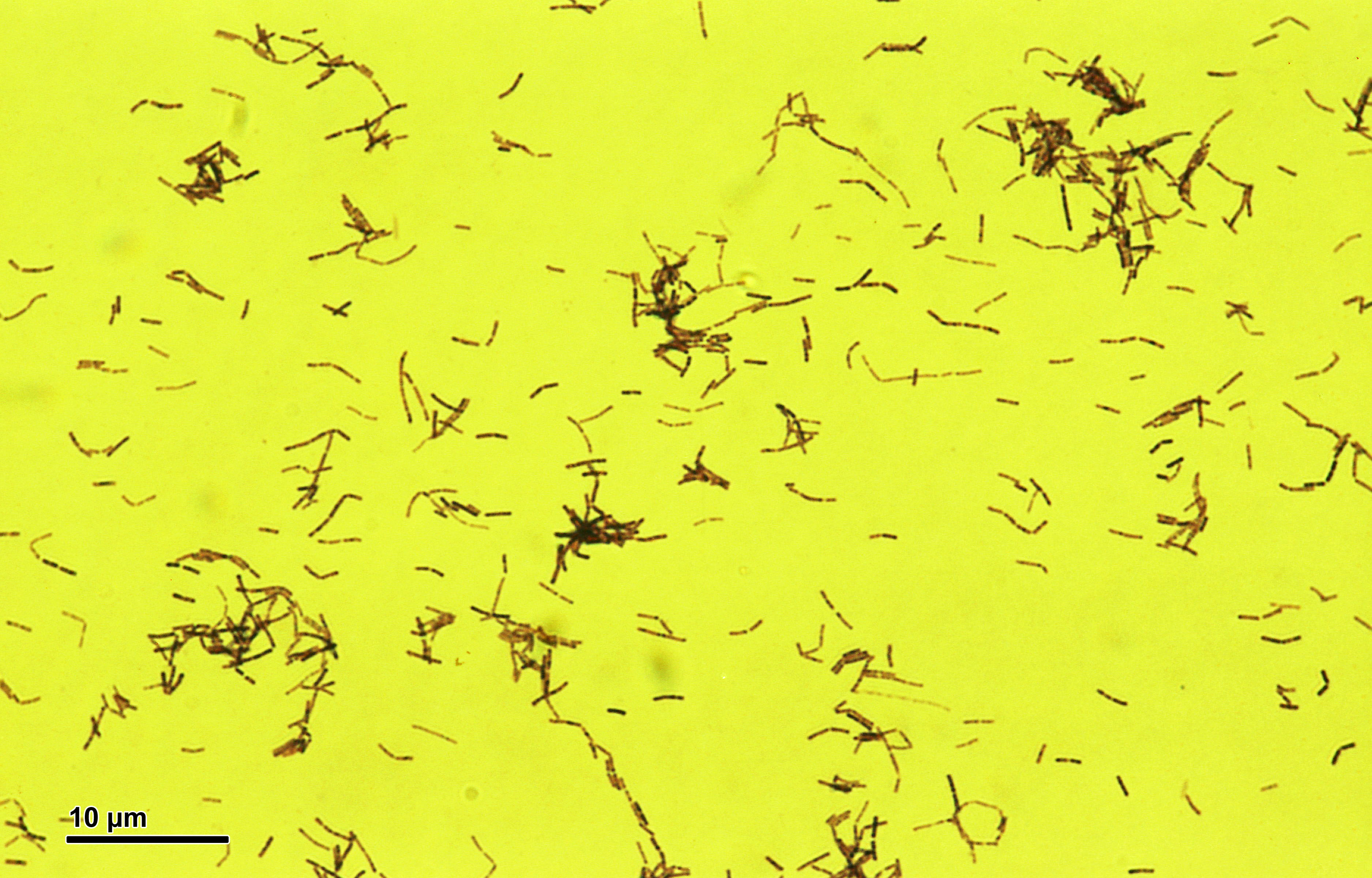
A Lactobacillus acidophilus culture

Lactobacillus acidophilus is an immobile rod-shaped (bacillus), gram-positive organism that ranges in size from 2-10 μm in size. L. acidophilus has one phospholipid bilayer membrane with a large cell wall consisting of peptidoglycan exterior to the membrane. The cell wall of L. acidophilus is interwoven with teichoic acids and surface proteins, with anionic and neutral polysaccharides as well as an S-layer lining the exterior of the cell. The S-layer proteins of L. acidophilus have been shown to adhere to epithelial cells as well as mucus and other extracellular proteins. The S-layer is made of two structural domains. The C-terminal domain is responsible for cell wall anchoring, while the N-terminal domain is responsible for interacting with the cell environment, as well as S-layer self assembly. In the L. acidophilus species, the N-terminal region shows high amino acid variability along with low sequence homology (31-72%). However, the C-terminus shows low amino acid variability and high amino acid sequence homology (77-99%).L. acidophilus does not have any extracellular means of motion like a flagellum or pilli, and therefore is an immobile microbe.

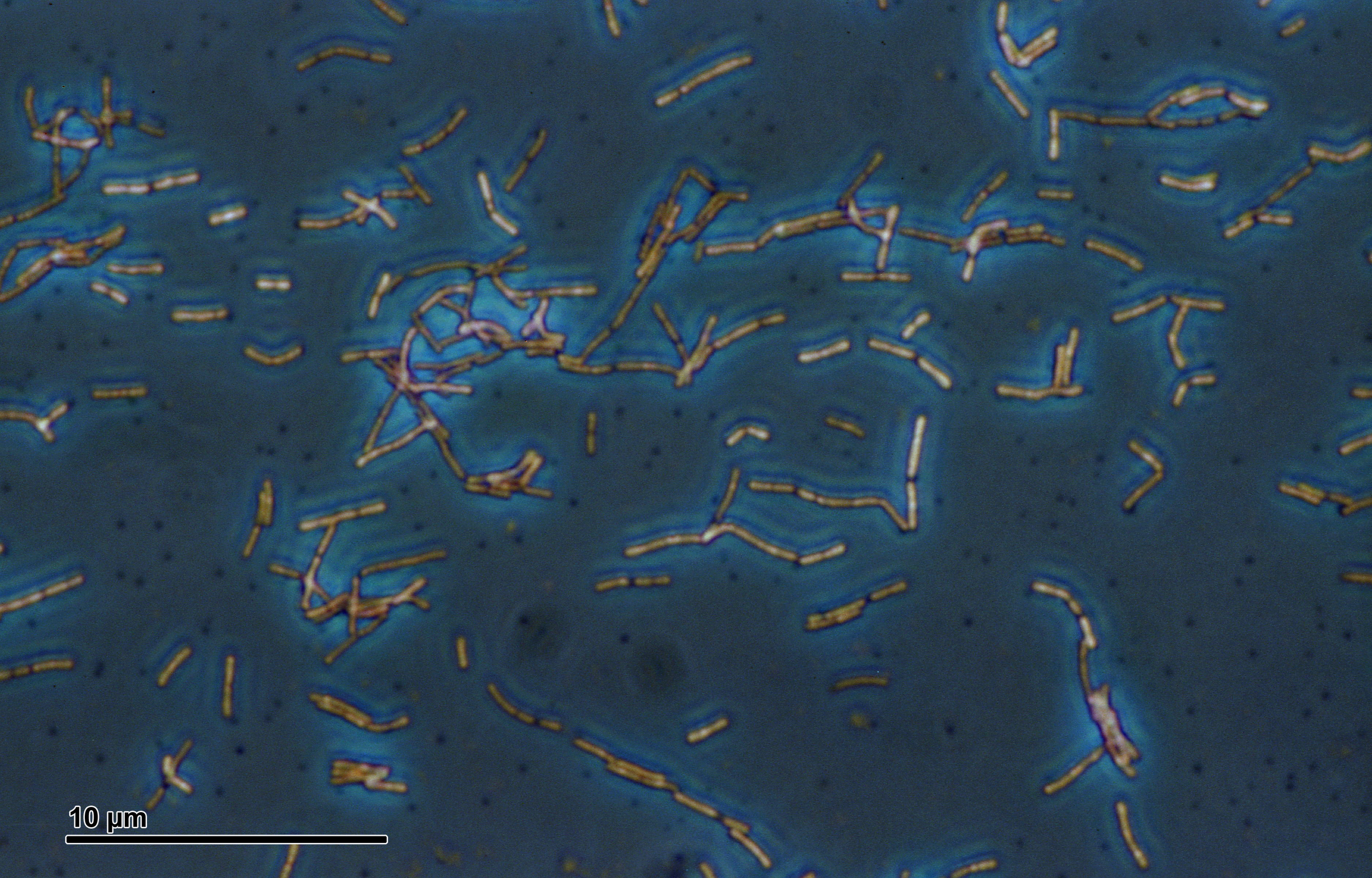
Lactobacillus acidophilus under microscope with dark light background.

=== Metabolism ===
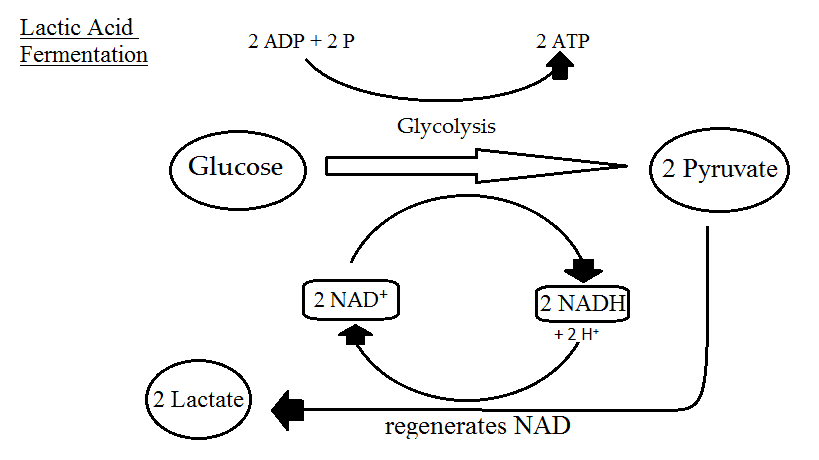
Pathway by which glucose is converted to lactic acid as a means of energy production

L. acidophilus is a homofermentative anaerobic microorganism, meaning it only produces lactic acid as an end product of fermentation; and that it can only ferment hexoses (not pentoses) by way of the EMP pathway (glycolysis). L. acidophilus has a slower growth time in milk than when in a host due to limited available nutrients. Because of its use as a probiotic in milk, a study done by the American Journal of Dairy Science examined the nutrient requirements of L. acidophilus in an effort to increase its low growth rate. The study found that glucose and the amino acids cysteine, glutamic acid, isoleucine, leucine, lysine, methionine, phenylalanine, threonine, tyrosine, valine, and arginine are essential nutrients to the growth of L. acidophilus, with glycine, calcium-pantothenate, and Mn^{2+} acting as stimulatory nutrients. The study helps to explain the low growth rate of L. acidophilus in milk, as some of the amino acids necessary to L. acidophilus growth are lacking in milk. Adding amino acids with high rates of consumption to fermented milk is a possible solution to the problem.

=== Genomics ===
The specialization of prokaryotic genomes is distinguishable when recognizing how the prokaryote replicates its DNA during replication. In L. acidophilus, replication begins at an origin called oriC and moves bi-directionally in the form of replication forks. The DNA is synthesized continuously on the leading strand and in discontinuous Okazaki fragments on the lagging strand with help from the DNA polymerase III enzyme. An RNA primer is needed to initiate the DNA synthesis on the leading and lagging strands. DNA polymerase III follows the RNA primer with the synthesis of DNA in the 5' to 3' direction. L. acidophilus consists of a small genome with a low guanine-cytosine content, approximately 30%. A study comparing 46 genomes of varying strains of L. acidophilus found the genome size ranged from 1.95 Mb to 2.09 Mb, with an average size of 1.98 Mb. The average number of coding sequences in the genome was 1780, with the strains isolated from fermented foods and commercial probiotics having more coding sequences on average than those isolated from humans. L. acidophilus has an open state pan-genome (all of the genes within a species), meaning that the pan-genome size increased as the number of genomes sequenced increased. The core-genome (the genes shared by all individuals of a species) consist of around 1117 genes in the case of L. acidophilus. Genetic analysis also revealed that all L. acidophilus strains contained at least 15 families of glycosyl hydrolases, which are the key enzymes in carbohydrate metabolism. Each of the 15 GH families were involved in metabolizing common carbohydrates, such as glucose, galactose, fructose, sucrose, starch, and maltose. Genes encoding antibiotic resistance by means of antibiotic efflux, antibiotic target alteration, and antibiotic target protection were present in all L. acidophilus strains, providing protection against 18 different classes of antibiotic across all strains. Fluoroquinolone, glycopeptide, lincosamide, macrolide and tetracycline were the five classes of antibiotic to which L. acidophilus displayed the highest level of tolerance, with more than 300 genes relevant to these classes.

== Environment ==
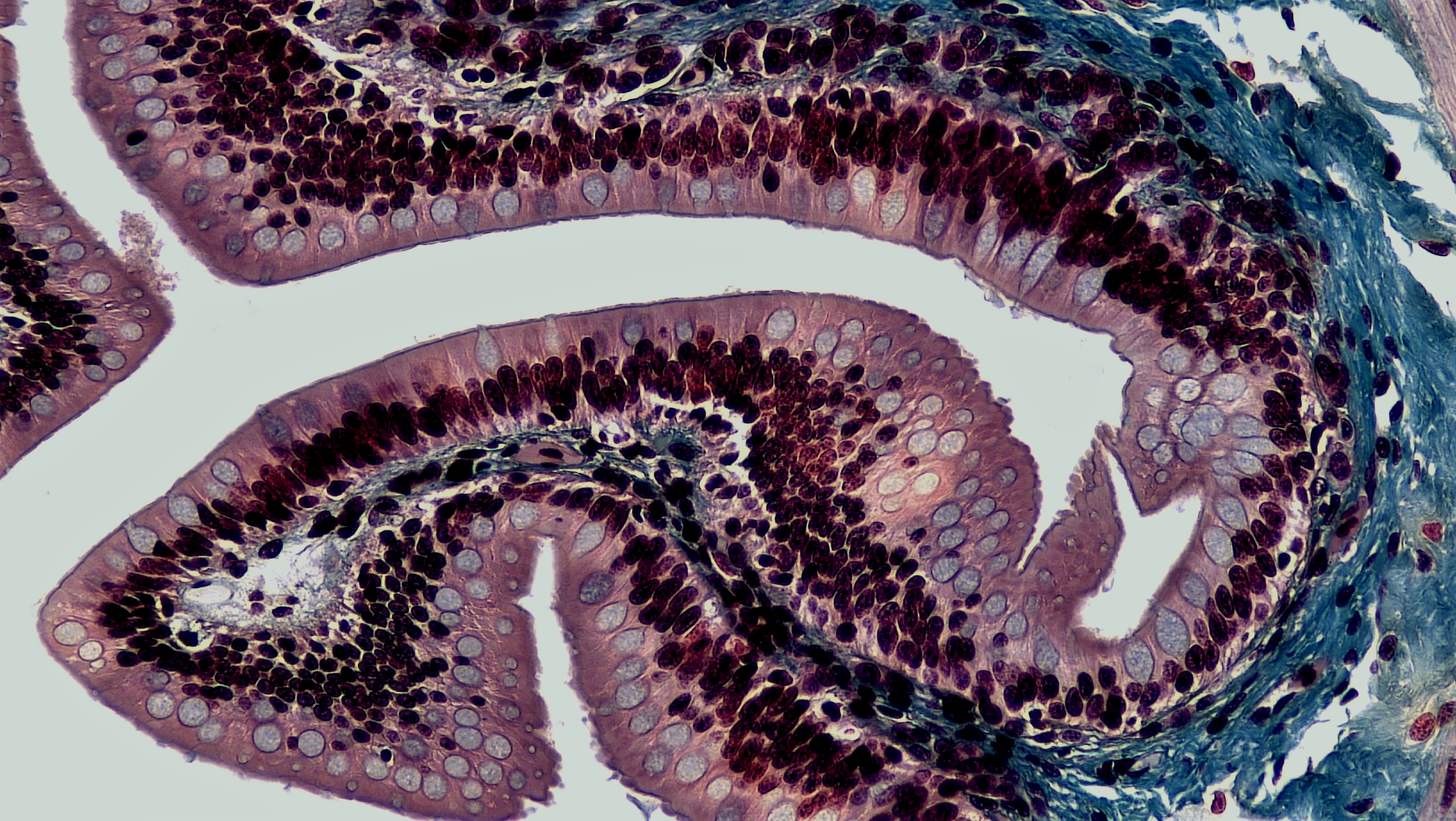
Columnar epithelial cells from a mammal's intestinal tract. L. acidophilus easily adheres to and commonly grows on this cell type

L. acidophilus grows naturally in the oral and intestinal cavities of mammals. Nearly all Lactobacillus species have special mechanisms for heat resistance which involves enhancing the activity of chaperones. Chaperones are highly conserved stress proteins that allow for enhanced resistance to elevated temperatures, ribosome stability, temperature sensing, and control of ribosomal function at high temperatures. This ability to function at high temperatures is extremely important to cell yield during the fermentation process, and genetic testing on L. acidophilus in order to increase its temperature tolerance is currently being done. When being considered as a probiotic, it is important for L. acidophilus to have traits suitable for life in the gastrointestinal tract. Tolerance of low pH and high toxicity levels are often required. These traits vary and are strain specific. Mechanisms by which these tolerances are expressed include differences in cell wall structure, along with other changes is protein expression. Changes in salt concentration have been shown to affect L. acidophilus viability, but only after exposure to higher salt concentrations. In another experiment highlighted by the American Dairy Science Association, viable cell counts only showed a significant reduction after exposure to NaCl concentrations of 7.5% or higher. Cells were also observed to distinctly elongate when grown in conditions of 10% NaCl concentration or higher. L. acidophilus is also very well suited for living in a dairy medium, as fermented milk is the ideal method of delivery for introducing L. acidophilus into a gut microbiome. The viability of L. acidophilus cells encapsulated by spray drying technology stored at refrigerated condition (4 °C) is higher than the viability of cells stored at room temperature (25 °C).

=== Quorum sensing ===
Quorum sensing among cells is the process among which cell signaling can lead to coordinated activities which can ultimately help bacteria control gene expression in a consecutive sequence. This is accomplished via detection of small autoinducers which are secreted in response to increasing cell-population density. In Lactobacillus acidophilus, which can be found in the gastrointestinal tract, quorum sensing is important for bacterial interaction when considering biofilm formation and toxin secretion. In L. acidophilus, along with many other bacteria, the luxS-mediated quorum sensing is involved in the regulation of behavior. In monoculture, the production of luxS increased during the exponential growth phase and started to plateau as it progressed to the stationary phase. Up-regulation of luxS can occur when L. acidophilus is placed in co-cultivation with another Lactobacillus species.

=== Vaginal microbiota ===
Lactobacillus acidophilus is relatively rare in the vaginal microbiome; it is more common in the gut. Other species in the genus are more common, including Lactobacillus crispatus, Lactobacillus gasseri, Lactobacillus jensenii, and Lactobacillus iners. In experiments, L. acidophilus seemed to decrease Candida albicans' ability to adhere to vaginal epithelial cells; however, L. acidophilus' use in preventing yeast infections is unclear because this species of Lactobacilli has also been found not to have a very strong ability to adhere to (and thereby colonize) the vaginal cells.

== Therapeutic uses ==
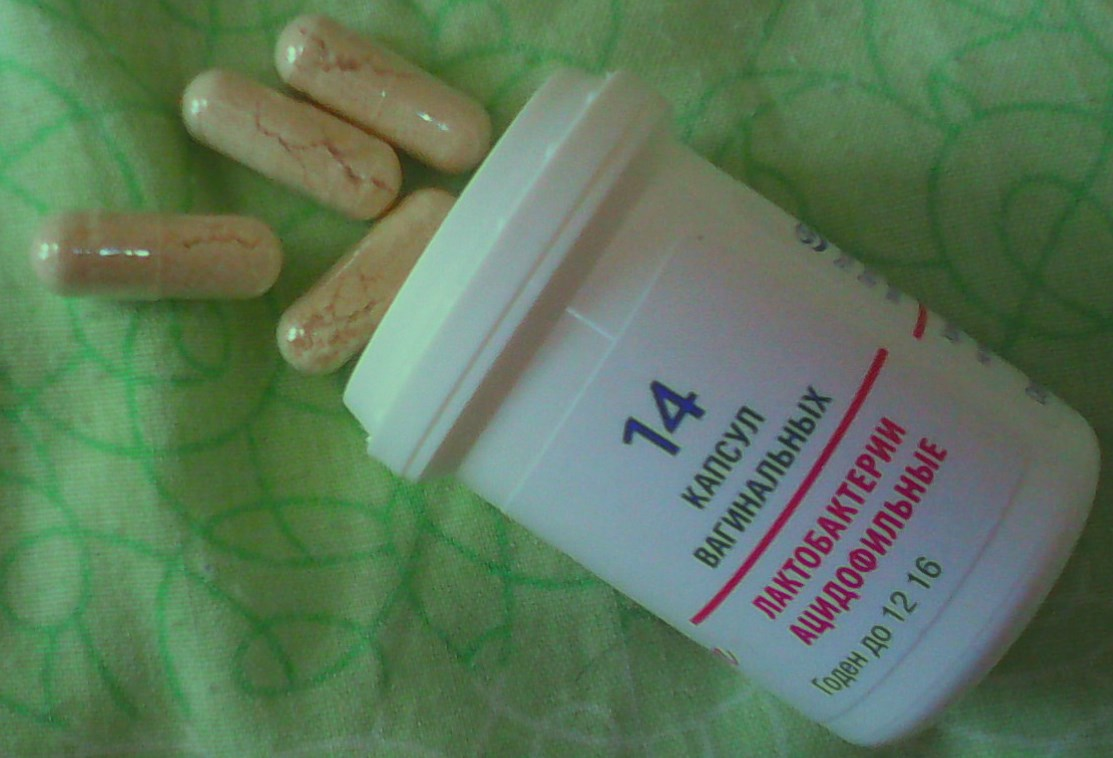
A capsule containing L. acidophilus used for vaginal health

Research has shown that the presence of L. acidophilus can produce a variety of probiotic effects in humans, such as acting as a barrier against pathogens, assisting in lactose digestion, enhancing immune response, and reducing cholesterol level. L. acidophilus must exist in concentrations of 10^5 - 10^6 c.f.u (colony-forming units) per mL in order for these effects to be seen. A study conducted at the Wake Forest School of Medicine examined the effects of L. acidophilus on the structure and composition of the gut microbiome of mice with respect to the age of the mice. The research established the importance of the interactions between microbes within a gut microbial environment on the overall health of the organism, and the data showed that mice supplemented with L. acidophilus had reduced proteobacteria levels, and increased levels of other probiotic bacteria when compared to other mice of similar age. Another study conducted at Maranatha Christian University studied the impact of L. acidophilus cell free supernatants (a liquid medium containing the metabolites produced by microbial growth) on the growth pattern of Salmonella typhi, the microbe associated with Typhoid fever. The study showed that the presence of L. acidophilus metabolites significantly inhibited the growth curves displayed by S. typhi, supporting the idea that L. acidophilus presence has a positive impact on the species makeup of a gut microbial community, providing the organism with intestinal health benefits. The innate immune system of L. acidophilus also produces antimicrobial peptides. The group of short peptides found there have shown antimicrobial properties such as their strength against viruses and other cell types, including cancer cells. There is also some evidence supporting the use of a symbiotic gel (containing L. acidophilus) in treating gastrointestinal symptoms in patients who had received a hemodialysis treatment. This gel also reduced the occurrence of vomit, heartburn, and stomachaches. Further study concerning this subject is needed to draw firm conclusions.

In 2023, Lactobacillus acidophilus was the 297th most commonly prescribed medication in the United States, with more than 400,000 prescriptions.

=== Dairy industry usage ===
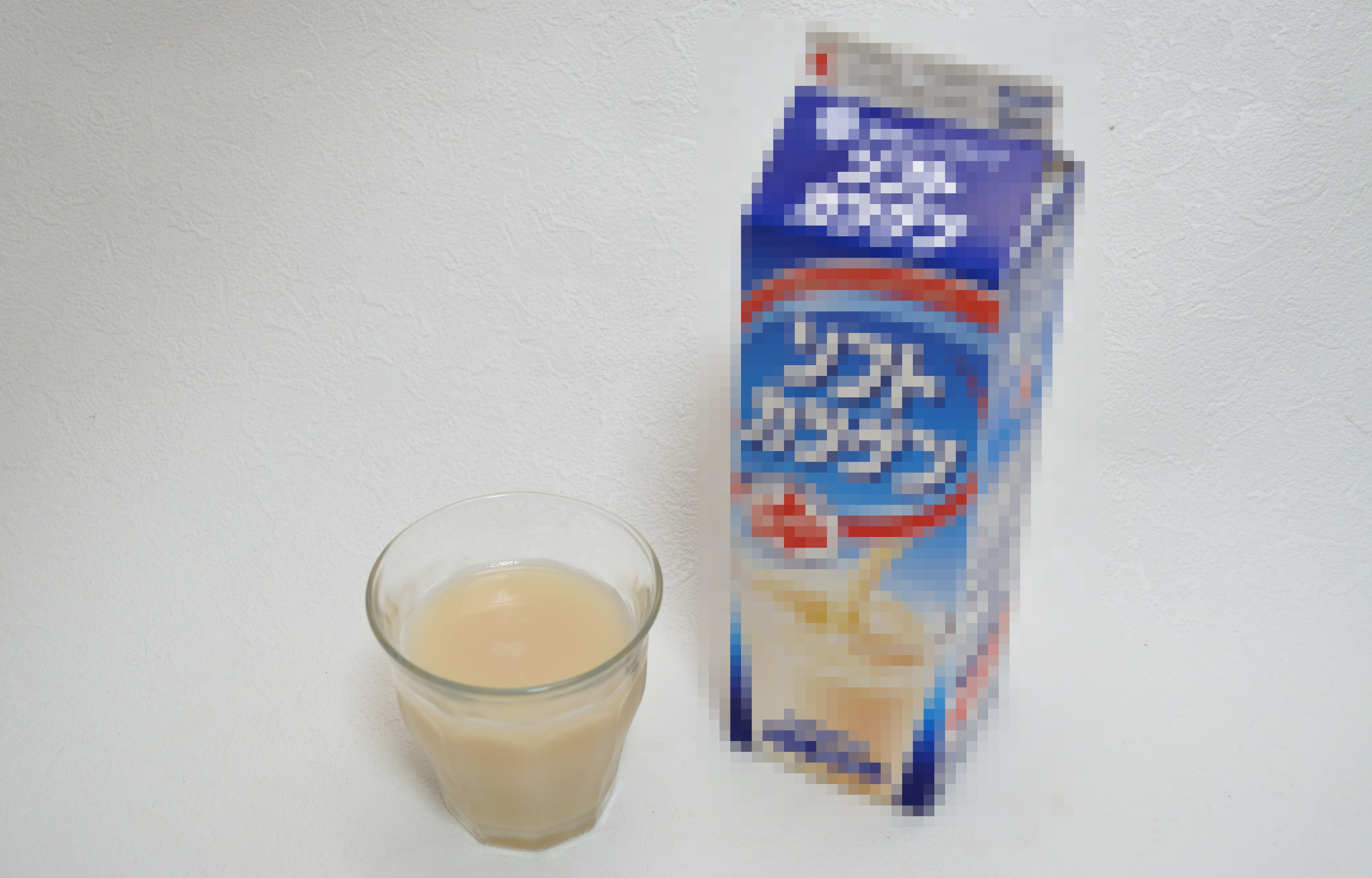
An example of fermented milk, a dairy product L. acidophilus is commonly added to for probiotic effects

As stated in a journal from the American Dairy Science Association, "Lactobacillus acidophilus is a commercial strain and probiotic that is widely used in the dairy industry to obtain high-quality fermentation products." Increased levels of beneficial bacteria, and decreased levels of pathogenic bacteria within the intestine due to the consumption of fermented milk containing strains of L. acidophilus has a range of probiotic effects. Reduced serum cholesterol levels, stimulated immune response, and improved lactic acid digestion are all probiotic effects associated with intestinal L. acidophilus presence. L. acidophilus was also effective in reducing Streptococcus mutans levels in saliva, as well as decreasing risk factors associated with the development of nonalcoholic fatty liver disease. The strain of L. acidophilus that has been most widely researched, and is most widely used as a probiotic and is referred to as NCFM.

The most common species of Lactobacillus for use in the production of yoghurt is Lactobacillus delbrueckii subsp. bulgaricus.

=== Side effects ===
Although probiotics are generally safe, when they are used by oral administration there is a small risk of passage of viable bacteria from the gastrointestinal tract to the blood stream (bacteremia), which can cause adverse health consequences. Some people, such as those with a compromised immune system, short bowel syndrome, central venous catheters, cardiac valve disease and premature infants, may be at higher risk for adverse events.

== See also ==
- Lactic acid fermentation
