= Genitourinary microbiome =

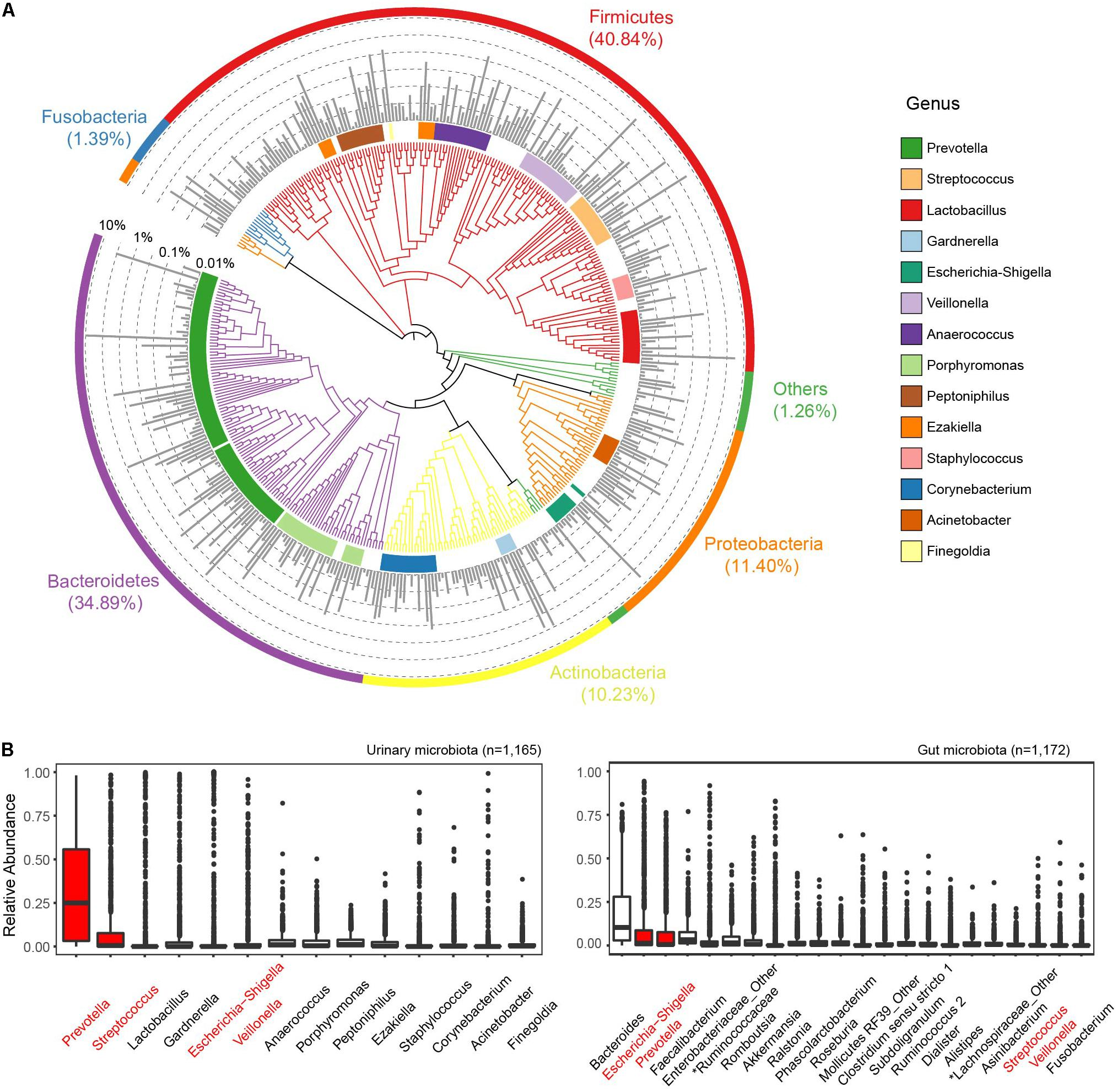
Figure 1 from Frontiers in Microbiology: Characterization of the Genitourinary Microbiome of 1,165 Middle-Aged and Elderly Healthy Individuals (2021). This study identified Bacteroidetes and Firmicutes as the primary phyla present in the human genitourinary microbiome.

The genitourinary microbiome refers to the aggregate of bacteria, archaea, and fungi that may colonize the human genital and urinary tract. Some analyses also include any viruses and protists present. This term encompasses both the human urinary microbiome (urobiome), as well as the genital microbiome, and is a subset of the human microbiome.

The study of the genitourinary microbiome is young; only the vaginal microbiome has been thoroughly characterized. The development of next-generation sequencing has allowed researchers to use 16S ribosomal RNA to identify organisms present in asymptomatic or "healthy" individuals.

== Research ==
Studies of the human microbiome traditionally lack in discussion of the genitourinary system due to the long-standing misnomer that urine that does not grow colony-forming units (CFUs) in standard microbiological cultures is "sterile". This has stunted research on microbiomes of the bladder or urethra.

There is now evidence to support colonization of the female bladder as well as the male lower urinary tract. The significance of the genitourinary microbiome on disease incidence or progression is not yet understood. Perturbations in the genitourinary microbiome could have implications for patients with urinary tract infections (UTIs), sexually transmitted infections (STIs), interstitial cystitis and chronic prostatitis.

== The urinary microbiome ==
=== Composition ===
In both males and females, Bacillota, Actinobacteria, Bacteroidetes, Proteobacteria, and Fusobacteria make up the general phyla of the human urinary microbiome, with Firmicutes/Bacillota and Bacteroidetes accounting for about 74% of relative abundance. Studies up until 2018 found the general bacterial species composition of the urinary microbiome to consist of primarily Lactobacillus, Gardnerella, and Streptococcus. In 2021, Qin et al performed a thorough 16S RNA sequencing of asymptomatic subjects and found Prevotella, Escherichia-Shigella, and Veillonella in addition to the previously mentioned classes. It is unclear whether Prevotella may be more predominantly found in Chinese populations; more studies are needed in diverse populations to determine possible genetic, diet-related, and geographical factors. Current findings agree with the species identified in the Human Microbiome Project; however, the genitourinary microbiome was notably excluded from analysis.

=== Gender and age disparities ===
Anatomical and hormonal factors can influence the composition of the genitourinary microbiome. Differences mostly lie at the species level rather than the phylum level. Research shows a higher prevalence of organisms in females that correspond with healthy vaginal flora. There is evidence to support that the urinary microbiome changes with age, possibly due to changes in hormones, diet, and metabolism. Differences between age groups are seen in relative abundance of species. Women tend to have a decrease in Lactobacillus abundance after menopause, which reinforces the idea that hormones may affect microbiome composition.

== Urinary tract infections and the urobiome ==
The most common disease-causing organisms in urinary tract infections are Escherichia coli, Enterococcus faecalis, Klebsiella species, Pseudomonas aeruginosa, Proteus species and Streptococcus species. Many of these species may also be present in a "typical" human urobiome, but several factors influence the makeup and proportions of organisms, including age, gender, and diet.

Studies have found that utilizing expanded incubation procedures, such as 5% CO_{2}, allows for the growth of more fastidious organisms. This mirrors updates from the Human Microbiome Project, which suggests biodiversity of microorganisms colonizing every part of the human body may be higher than previously thought. The acceleration of various testing methods, like Polymerase Chain Reaction (PCR) and 16S RNA sequencing, have allowed for a more thorough understanding of clinical samples that may not meet clinical requirements for significant growth. Data from molecular studies suggests that non-culturable or slow-growing organisms may be present in urine samples and not identified due to the limitations of standard microbiological culture parameters.

=== Testing limitations ===
Uncontaminated urine samples are difficult to obtain without urinary catheterization due to the proximity of the urinary system to genitals and the GI tract. This is especially a problem for female patients, who are often uninformed about proper clean-catch urine collection procedure or the significance of skin flora in urinary cultures. It is likely to see streptococci or staphylococci as a result of contamination from vaginal fluids, as these gram-positive organisms grow favorably in standard incubation parameters. Using correct clean-catch urine collection procedure can reduce the likelihood of contamination. For women, this requires using a sterile wipe on the area prior to collection, spreading the labia, and collecting a mid-stream sample.

==== Urotypes ====
Many researchers will group cohorts into "urotypes" with similar microbiological community structure since a single "typical" genitourinary microbiome community does not exist. For example, a urotype may be characterized by being dominated by Gardnerella, Streptococcus, or Staphylococcus. More research is needed to understand the influence of genetic and environmental factors on the development of urotypes.

== The genital microbiome ==
=== Females ===
The vaginal microbiome has been thoroughly characterized. Organisms belonging to the vaginal flora may be seen in urine cultures due to contamination or collection method. The most abundant organisms in the vaginal microbiome are Lactobacilli, which do not grow in standard microbiological urine cultures. Some common organisms from this genus found in the vaginal microbiome include L. crispatus, L. iners, L. jensenii, and L. gasseri.

=== Males ===
Characterization of the microbiome of the internal male reproductive system has not been performed. Males were not previously known to have a genital microbiome due to the connection to the urinary system, but research no longer supports sterility of the urethra and/or bladder in males or females.

== Clinical implications ==
The full implications of disturbances in the genitourinary microbiome on disease is not known. The main targets of study are recurrent and polymicrobial UTIs, interstitial cystitis and chronic prostatitis. Disturbances in the microbiome may affect the occurrence or severity of sexually transmitted infections. A 2010 study found that urine samples from men with STIs had higher presence of slow-growing or non-culturable bacteria.

=== Antibiotic stewardship ===
Any time antibiotics are administered to treat an overgrowth of disease-causing bacteria, the microbiome is also affected. Decreasing relative abundance of the genital or urinary microbiome can lead to recurrent urinary tract infections and yeast infections in the vagina. Lactobacilli typically prevent overgrowth of Candida species in the vagina. Chronic antibiotic use can lead to the formation of antibiotic-resistant organisms and contribute to the incidence of polymicrobial urinary tract infections.
