= UAS Laboratories =

American biotechnology company

UAS Laboratories, Inc.
- Company type: Biotechnology
- Industry: Probiotics
- Founded: 1979
- Founder: Dr. S. K. Dash
- Headquarters: 555 N 72nd Ave, Wausau, WI 54401
- Area served: Worldwide
- Key people: Kevin Mehring, President/CEO; Dr. Gregory Leyer, CSO; Ronald Pillsbury, COO
- Products: Probiotic Raw Materials, Custom Manufacturing, and Private label
- Website: www.uaslabs.com

United Agricultural Services Laboratories, commonly referred to as UAS Laboratories, is a private biotechnology company headquartered in Wausau, Wisconsin, USA. The company formulates and markets probiotics for both domestic and international markets. Probiotic fermentation is done at the facility located in Madison, Wisconsin, the process of probiotic fermentation is done. The formulation, manufacturing and distribution is done at their facility in Wausau, Wisconsin.

== History ==
UAS Laboratories was founded in 1979 by Dr. S.K. Dash, who had previously served as the Director of the South Dakota Food and Drug. UAS Laboratories was headquartered in Edina, Minnesota, USA. The company decided to base its DDS Probiotics products on Lactobacillus acidophilus DDS-1, a strain of probiotic bacteria that was patented and trademarked. L. acidophilus has been one of the most common strains used in probiotics research. Under the direction of Dr. S.K. Dash, UAS Laboratories expanded its production capacity and tripled its probiotic manufacturing capacity in 2012.

In April 2013, UAS Laboratories was acquired by Lakeview Equity Partners. In January 2014, the company moved its sales and marketing office to Madison, WI.

In April 2018, The company acquired probiotic supplier Nebraska Cultures, Inc. Later that same year, in July, the company announced its licensing agreement with Ace Biome, an agreement that included the manufacturing and commercialization of Lactobacillus gasseri BNR17, a patented probiotic.

The company was purchased by Chr. Hansen Holding in 2020 for approximately $530 million.
