= Initial acquisition of microbiota =

Formation of an organism's microbiota at birth

The initial acquisition of microbiota is the formation of an organism's microbiota immediately before and after birth. The microbiota (also called flora) are all the microorganisms including bacteria, archaea and fungi that colonize the organism. The microbiome is another term for microbiota or can refer to the collected genomes.

Many of these microorganisms interact with the host in ways that are beneficial and often play an integral role in processes like digestion and immunity. The microbiome is dynamic: it varies between individuals, over time, and can influenced by both endogenous and exogenous forces.

Abundant research in invertebrates has shown that endosymbionts may be transmitted vertically to oocytes or externally transmitted during oviposition. Research on the acquisition of microbial communities in vertebrates is relatively sparse, but also suggests that vertical transmission may occur.

== In humans ==
Early hypotheses assumed that human babies are born sterile and that any bacterial presence in the uterus would be harmful to the fetus. Some believed that both the womb and maternal milk were sterile, and that bacteria did not enter an infant's intestinal tract until supplementary food was provided. In 1900, the French pediatrician Henry Tissier isolated Bifidobacterium from the stool of healthy, breast-fed infants. He concluded that breast milk was not sterile and suggested that diarrhea caused by an imbalance of intestinal flora could be treated by supplementing food with Bifidobacterium. However, Tissier still claimed that the womb was sterile and that infants did not come into contact with bacteria until entering the birth canal.

Over the last few decades, research on the perinatal acquisition of microbiota in humans has expanded as a result of developments in DNA sequencing technology. Bacteria have been detected in umbilical cord blood, amniotic fluid, and fetal membranes of healthy, term babies. The meconium, an infant's first bowel movement of digested amniotic fluid, has also been shown to contain a diverse community of microbes. These microbial communities consist of genera commonly found in the mouth and intestines, which may be transmitted to the uterus via the blood stream, and in the vagina, which may ascend through the cervix.

== In non-human vertebrates ==
In one experiment, pregnant mice were given food containing genetically labeled Enterococcus faecium. The meconium of term offspring delivered by these mice via sterile C-section was found to contain labeled E. faecium, while pups from control mice given non-inoculated food did not contain E. faecium. This evidence supports the possibility of vertical microbial transmission in mammals.

Most research on vertical transmission in non-mammalian vertebrates focuses on pathogens in agricultural animals (e.g. chicken, fish). It is not known whether these species also incorporate commensal flora into eggs.

== In invertebrates ==
Marine sponges are host to many sponge-specific microbe species that are found across several sponge lineages. These microbes are detected in divergent populations without overlapping ranges but are not found in the sponges' immediate environment. As a result, it is thought that the symbionts were established by a colonization event before sponges diversified and are maintained through vertical (and, to a lesser extent, horizontal) transmission. The presence of microorganisms in both the oocytes and in the embryos of sponges has been confirmed.

Many insects depend on microbial symbionts to obtain amino acids and other nutrients that are not available from their primary food source. Microbiota may be passed on to offspring via bacteriocytes associated with the ovaries or developing embryo, by feeding larvae with microbe-fortified food, or by smearing eggs with a medium containing microbes during oviposition. Alternatively, in other instances, microbiota composition can also be determined by the environment, as is the case for mosquito larvae, living in the water.

== See also ==
- Human microbiome project
- Human microbiota
- Gut flora
- Vaginal flora
