= Lactobacillus jensenii =

Scientific classification
- Domain: Bacteria
- Kingdom: Bacillati
- Phylum: Bacillota
- Class: Bacilli
- Order: Lactobacillales
- Family: Lactobacillaceae
- Genus: Lactobacillus
- Species: L. jensenii

Binomial name
- Lactobacillus jensenii Falsen et al. 1999

Species of bacterium

Lactobacillus jensenii is a lactic acid bacteria species in the genus Lactobacillus.

It is one of the four main species of Lactobacillus considered to be the major part of the vaginal flora, along with Lactobacillus crispatus, Lactobacillus gasseri, and Lactobacillus iners.

L. jensenii is sometimes used in producing fermented foods.

Lactobacillus jensenii produces enzymes that cause hydrolase release from the liver. Hydrolase aids in the digestion of food in the upper gastrointestinal tract.

Lactobacillus jensenii and other Lactobacillus species that produce lactic acid, (most notably L. crispatus), have been correlated with a decreased rate of bacterial vaginosis, gonorrhea- and HIV-acquisition and pelvic inflammatory disease. A stable colonization with these species, as opposed to dominantly L. iners, is associated with better reproductive outcomes, e.g. a decreased rate of preterm birth.

== Discovery ==
Lactobacillus jensenii was discovered by F. Gasser, M. Mandel, and M. Rogosa in 1969. Although sharing many characterization criteria, L. jensenii differed from the similar Lactobacillus leichmannii in a gel electrophoresis analysis of their respective lactic dehydrogenases. The species was named in honour of Sigurd Orla-Jensen, a Danish microbiologist and a pioneer of biotechnology.

== Characterization ==
Lactobacillus jensenii is Gram-positive, rod-shaped, negative for catalase and oxidase, and anaerobic. The organism can grow on blood agar.

== Morphology ==
Colonies of L. jensenii are circular, colorless, small, and translucent.

== Infection ==
Bloodstream infection by Lactobacilli is rare but often fatal, with 30% of endocarditis cases caused by the genus resulting in patient mortality. While L. jensenii takes advantage of nonimmunocompetence in patients, immunocompetent cases have also been observed.

== Treatment ==
In the rare occurrence of infection, L. jensenii can be treated with teicoplanin and meropenem.
