= Vaginal flora =

Microorganisms present in the vagina

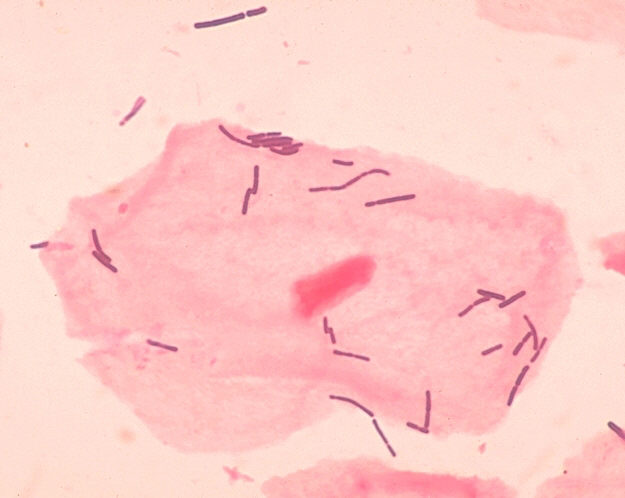
Lactobacilli and a vaginal squamous cell

Vaginal flora, vaginal microbiota or vaginal microbiome are the microorganisms that colonize the vagina. They were discovered by the German gynecologist Albert Döderlein in 1892 and are part of the overall human flora. The amount and type of bacteria present have significant implications for an individual's overall health. The primary colonizing bacteria of a healthy individual are of the genus Lactobacillus, such as L. crispatus, and the lactic acid they produce is thought to protect against infection by pathogenic species.

== Lactobacilli ==
The primary colonizing bacteria of a healthy individual are of the genus Lactobacillus (90–95%), the most common being L. crispatus, L. iners, L. jensenii, and L. gasseri. Since the first description of lactobacilli by Döderlein, lactobacilli have been generally considered the gatekeepers of the vaginal ecosystem. Lactobacilli have been shown to inhibit in vitro growth of pathogenic microorganisms, e.g. Bacteroides fragilis, Escherichia coli, Gardnerella vaginalis, Mobiluncus spp., Neisseria gonorrhoeae, Peptostreptococcus anaerobius, Prevotella bivia and Staphylococcus aureus. It is generally accepted that this is achieved mainly through the action of lactic acid. Moreover, lactobacilli normally help to prevent long-term colonization of the vagina by adhering to vaginal epithelial cells. This usually reduces pathogens from infecting to the vaginal epithelium.

Next to lactic acid production and competition for adherence, other antagonistic mechanisms include hydrogen peroxide (a broad-spectrum antimicrobial) and bacteriocins (target-specific antimicrobials) production.

=== pH and lactic acid ===
Glycogen is the complex form of sugar present in the vaginal epithelium that is metabolized into lactic acid

Low pH is generally accepted to be the main mechanism controlling the composition of the vaginal microflora. Although the lactic acid produced by lactobacilli contributes to the vaginal acidity, it is still not proven to be the primary source of low vaginal pH, but the fact remains that most lactobacilli thrive best at a pH < 3.5 . Normal vaginal pH is considered to be under 4.5 with a range of 3.8 to 4.4.

=== Hydrogen peroxide ===
Production of hydrogen peroxide (H_{2}O_{2}) is a proposed mechanism for bacterial antagonism in vitro, inhibiting growth of microorganisms via direct interaction or via human myeloperoxidase. However, in vivo, the role of peroxide is uncertain. Under optimal anaerobic growth conditions, physiological concentrations of lactic acid inactivated the BV-associated pathogens without affecting the vaginal lactobacilli. Although the hydrogen peroxide production of lactobacilli has been considered as an important antimicrobial component, contributing to the colonization resistance provided by lactobacilli, and although there seems to be a link between H_{2}O_{2}-producing lactobacilli and normal vaginal microflora, recent data do not support this role for H_{2}O_{2}.

Experimentally, hydrogen peroxide-producing lactobacilli have been shown to inactivate HIV-1, herpes simplex virus type 2 (HSV-2), Trichomonas vaginalis, G. vaginalis, P. bivia and E. coli. O'Hanlon and Baeten found that 96% of Lactobacillus species from a healthy vaginal ecosystem produced H_{2}O_{2} (L. jensenii and L. vaginalis produce the highest levels of H_{2}O_{2}), whereas only 6% of the lactobacilli recovered from women with BV produced H_{2}O_{2}. In agreement with this, L. iners, most frequently associated with disturbed vaginal microflora, is a poor producer of H_{2}O_{2}. Vaginal colonization by H_{2}O_{2}-producing lactobacilli has been associated with a decrease in the occurrence of bacterial vaginosis (BV). However, more recently O'Hanlon et al. demonstrated that cervicovaginal fluid and semen have a significant H_{2}O_{2}-blocking activity and they later demonstrated that physiological concentrations of H_{2}O_{2} below 100 μM fail to inactivate any of the 17 tested BV-associated bacteria, e.g. A. vaginae, G. vaginalis, Mobiluncus spp., P. bivia, P. corporis, Mycoplasma hominis, even in the presence of human myeloperoxidase, known to increase the microbicidal activity of H_{2}O_{2}. Only supraphysiologic concentrations of exogenous H_{2}O_{2} (0.34% w/v, 100 mM) were sufficient to inactivate BV-associated bacteria at which concentration it more potently inactivated vaginal lactobacilli (L. crispatus, L. gasseri, L. iners and L. jensenii). A concentration of 100 mM H_{2}O_{2} is approximately 50-fold higher than lactobacilli are capable of producing even under optimal aerobic, low-antioxidant conditions, and approximately 5,000-fold higher than the estimated H_{2}O_{2} concentration in vivo. Even more remarkable, the addition of only 1% vaginal fluid blocked the microbicidal activity of 1 M H_{2}O_{2}. Possible explanations may be that cervicovaginal fluid and semen contain proteins, glycoproteins, polysaccharides, lipids, and other molecules with the potential to react with and inactivate H_{2}O_{2}. In addition, the vagina is hypoxic most of the time, whereas lactobacilli require oxygen to produce hydrogen peroxide. It is also remarkable that catalase, which provides bacteria protection against toxic H_{2}O_{2}, is absent in lactobacilli, and as such they would be unprotected against their own H_{2}O_{2} production. Consequently, hydrogen peroxide production may not be the major mechanism of defense.

=== Bacteriocins ===
Vaginal lactobacilli produce antimicrobial peptides, i.e. bacteriocins such as lactocin 160 and crispasin. with inhibitory activity ranging from narrow (closely related Lactobacillus species) to broad (diverse groups of bacteria, including G. vaginalis and P. bivia), and bacteriocin-like substances, with a broader spectrum of activity than bacteriocins (e.g. a heat-resistant peptide produced by Ligilactobacillus salivarius subsp. salivarius CRL 1328). Several studies have indicated that the activity of bacteriocins is favored by low pH.

The inhibitory substances produced by vaginal Lactobacillus is a primary factor in protecting the vaginal microbiota, with organic acids, bacteriocins, and hydrogen peroxide. These act synergistically against infection by pathogens. Not all Lactobacillus spp. and not all strains within one Lactobacillus species exhibit all 3 mechanisms. Lactobacillus species differ in premenopausal women, i.e. L. crispatus, L. jensenii, L. iners, L. gasseri (and possibly Limosilactobacillus vaginalis), as assessed through cultivation-dependent and cultivation-independent techniques. Vaginal lactobacilli have been shown to display a pronounced vaginotropism, and their pili act as ligands for attachment to receptors of vaginal epithelial cells. The limited number of Lactobacillus spp. found in the human vagina is remarkable, which leads to the possibility that there are host factors that select for specific organisms, that these species have unusual characteristics that allow them to successfully colonize the vagina, or both . However, the vaginotropism, does not only apply to this selected group of lactobacilli that stand for a healthy vagina, but also for the bacterial species associated with BV. The microbiota detected in the human genital and gut econiche do not appear to grow outside their host and probably are likely to rely on the close contact between parents and their children for transmission, e.g. mother to neonate transmission of genital microflora, most probably also with gut microflora homogenously distributed over the baby's body including skin, the oral cavity, nasopharynx, and feces.

== Bacterial vaginosis ==
Bacterial vaginosis (BV) is associated with the presence of Gardnerella vaginalis and Peptostreptococcus anaerobius and a decrease in the number of Lactobacillus species that comprise the healthy vaginal microbiota. BV is characterized by overgrowth of opportunistic bacteria and a decrease in Lactobacillus species. BV can present itself as symptomatic or asymptomatic. Symptoms include vaginal malodor, increased vaginal pH, and vaginal itching. There is no one known cause as to why BV occurs but it is typically associated with abnormal vaginal discharge (Coudray & Madhivanan, 2020). To diagnose BV in a clinical setting, an Amsel's criteria is used. This means that a patient must have an increased homogeneous thin vaginal discharge, pH secretion higher than 4.5, amine odor when secretions are exposed to hydroxide 10% solution, or clue cells visible on a wet mount. Another way to diagnose BV that is less often used in a clinical setting is a Nugent score. To obtain a Nugent score, gram stain techniques are carried out and it characterizes the bacterial morphology on a scale. A score greater than 7 is associated with BV, 4-6 is an intermediate abnormality, and 0-3 is normal.

Typically, only women with symptoms receive treatment. Treatments include antibiotics, specifically metronidazole and clindamycin (Hay, 2010). As rates of recurrence are high, women may also turn to treatments such as probiotics or boric acid suppositories. Boric acid has been used to treat BV since the 1800s. Yet due to the compound's role in killing pests, the prescription of boric acid by healthcare providers to treat BV may be met with dissatisfaction; science journalist Rachel E. Gross was inspired to write the book Vagina Obscura after receiving 'what was "basically rat poison"' from her gynecologist and accidentally ingesting it midway through her course of treatment, which led her to consider the extent of the medical establishment's neglect of women's health.

Studies have shown a correlation between vaginal microbiota and BV development through 16S RNA sequencing. Community state types (CSTs) are used to identify variation between a healthy vaginal microbiota and vaginal microbiota of someone with BV. Most CSTs in a healthy vaginal microbiome consist of different species of Lactobacillus. Studies found that L.iners is the dominant species in BV and L.crispatus is the dominant species in healthy vaginal microbiomes.

== Other microbiota ==
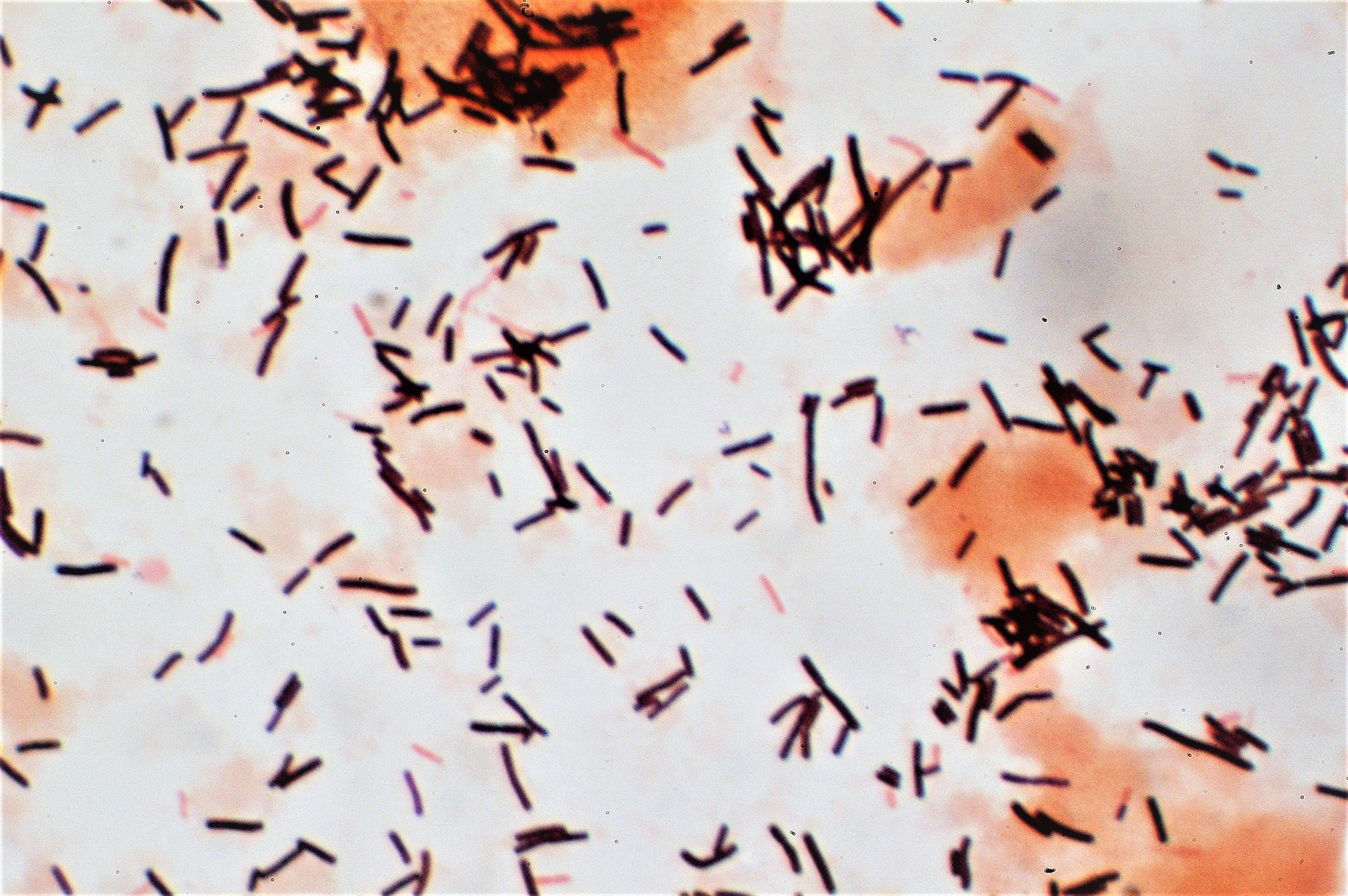
Gram stain of lactobacilli and squamous epithelial cells in vaginal swab

Healthy, normal vaginal microbiota that is dominated by lactobacilli may differ among some ethnic groups. Non-pathogenic vaginal species are part of the normal microbiota of some women. Several studies have demonstrated that a significant proportion (7–33%) of healthy asymptomatic women (especially black and Hispanic women) lack appreciable numbers of Lactobacillus species in the vagina, and instead have a vaginal microbiota that consist of other lactic acid-producing bacteria, i.e. species from the genera Atopobium, Leptotrichia, Leuconostoc, Megasphaera, Pediococcus, Streptococcus and Weissella, All ethnic populations have vaginal microflora communities containing lactic acid producing bacteria. This implies that not all communities may be equally resilient, so that if the resilience of a vaginal community is low then transitory changes in the structure of these communities may occur more readily in response to disturbances of various kinds, including menses, sexual intercourse, douching and contraceptive practices. These differences in the structure and composition of microbial communities may underlie well-known differences in the susceptibility of women in these racial groups to BV and various vaginal infections. Though vaginal microflora may be disturbed, and lactic acid is produced by other species, vaginal pH and acid production establish normal vaginal microbiota. The pH further decreases during pregnancy.

== Other vaginal bacterial species ==
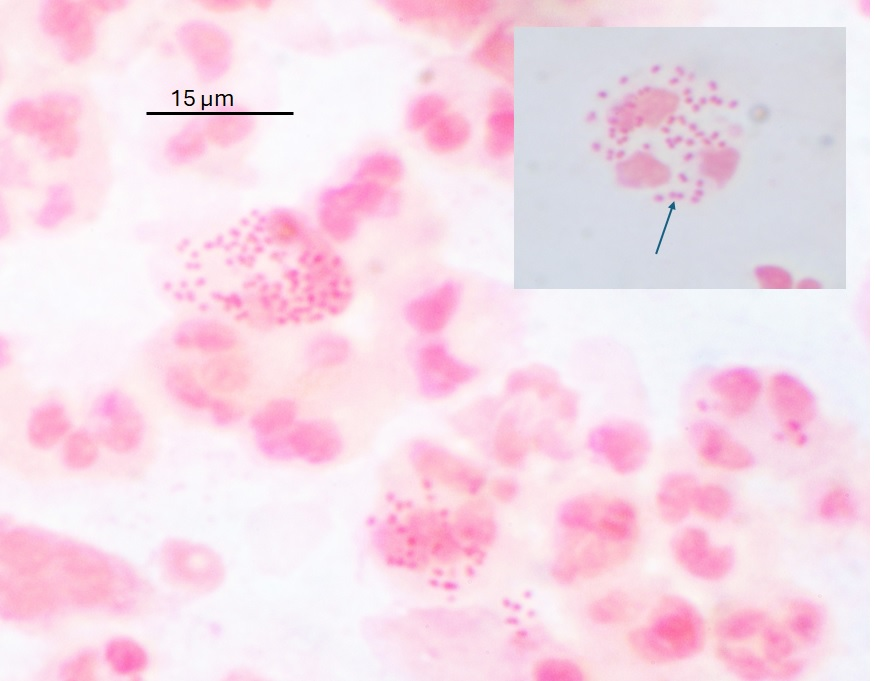
Gram stain of a vaginal swab showing gonococci (in pairs - arrow) inside polymorphonuclear granulocytes

Other bacterial species are frequently found in the vagina, such as the Gram positive cocci: Atopobium vaginae, Peptostreptococcus spp., Staphylococcus spp., Streptococcus spp., and Bacteroides spp., Fusobacterium spp., Gardnerella vaginalis, Mobiluncus, Prevotella spp., and Gram-negative enteric organisms, such as Escherichia coli. Mycoplasma and Ureaplasma are frequently found in the vagina. Some of the obligate and facultative anaerobic bacteria are associated with BV. Neisseria gonorrhoeae is found in the vagina and is considered a pathogen that is sexually transmitted.

== Pregnancy ==
The effect of tampon use on vaginal flora is debated, but application of tampons appears not to significantly modify the balance of bacterial presence. Pregnancy alters the microbiota with a reduction in species/genus diversity.

== Disease prevention ==
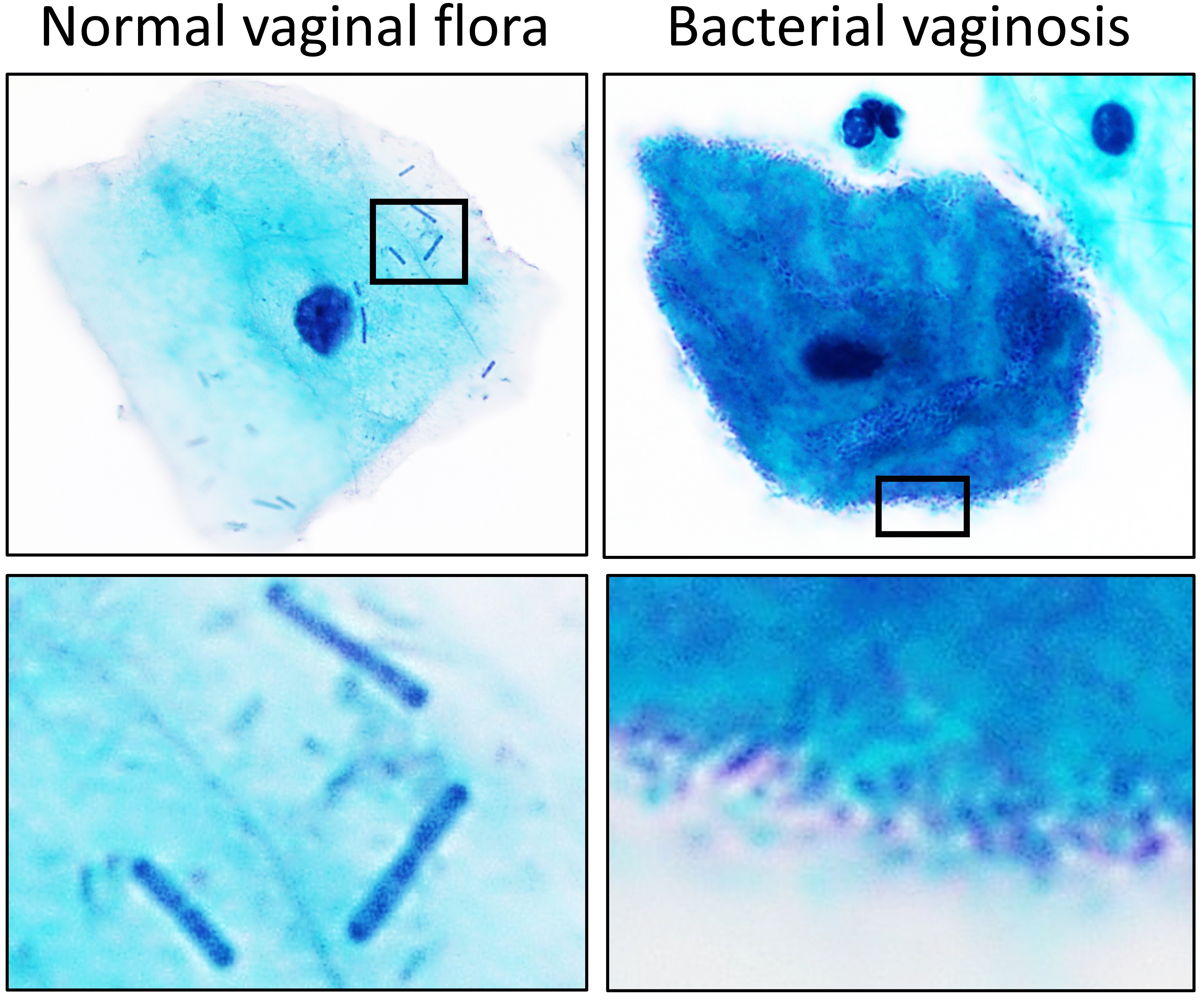
Vaginal squamous cell with normal vaginal flora versus bacterial vaginosis on Pap stain. Normal vaginal flora (left) is predominantly rod-shaped Lactobacilli, whereas in bacterial vaginosis (right) there is an overgrowth of bacteria, which can be of various species.

A healthy vaginal microbiome aids in the prevention of bacterial vaginosis, yeast infections and other possible problems by maintaining an acidic pH (< 4.5) that is unfavourable for the growth of common pathogens, such as Gardnerella vaginalis. The lactobacilli present in a healthy vaginal microbiome also occupy the ecological niche that would otherwise be available for exploitation by pathogenic organisms. However, harmful bacteria or an imbalance in bacteria can lead to infection.

There are many factors that contribute to the composition of vaginal microbiota including stress, age, lifestyle, diet, gut microbiota, antibiotics, probiotics, and vaginal infections.

Lifestyle can impact microbiota by means of personal hygiene. Research suggests that vaginal douching is associated with increased risk of BV. It also shows that sexual practices that include multiple sexual partners can increase BV or throw off stable microbiota composition. Smoking and alcohol consumption can also increase likelihood of BV development because it indirectly impacts the metabolite production profile. There is also research supporting the idea that increased stress levels can have an impact on the balance of vaginal lactobacilli by elevating cortisol levels, reducing vaginal glycogen, lowering lactobacilli, elevating vaginal pH, and increasing proinflammatory response.

It is becoming more commonly known how our diets can impact our gut microbiota, but it can have the same impact on vaginal microbiota. Research shows that diets rich in nutrients with low glycemic index and lower fat intake may be associated with a decreased chance of getting BV.

== Research ==
Investigations have found that the presence of lactobacilli in the vagina is associated with a lower incidence of sexually transmitted infections.

== See also ==
- Human Microbiome Project
- Lactic acid bacteria
- List of microbiota species of the lower reproductive tract of women
- Skin flora
- Vaginal microbiota in pregnancy
