= Lactobacillus iners =

Scientific classification
- Domain: Bacteria
- Kingdom: Bacillati
- Phylum: Bacillota
- Class: Bacilli
- Order: Lactobacillales
- Family: Lactobacillaceae
- Genus: Lactobacillus
- Species: L. iners

Binomial name
- Lactobacillus iners Falsen et al. 1999

Type strain
- CCUG 28746T

Species of bacterium

Lactobacillus iners is a species in the genus Lactobacillus. It is a Gram-positive, catalase-negative, facultatively anaerobic rod-shaped bacterium.

Lactobacillus iners is a normal inhabitant of the lower reproductive tract in healthy women, along with Lactobacillus crispatus, Lactobacillus jensenii, and Lactobacillus gasseri.

== Genome ==
The genomes of at least 15 strains have been sequenced and encode between 1,152 and 1,506 proteins. Thus, this species has one of the smallest Lactobacillus genomes compared to other species, such as L. crispatus, which typically encodes more than twice as many proteins.
