= Lactobacillus gasseri =

Scientific classification
- Domain: Bacteria
- Kingdom: Bacillati
- Phylum: Bacillota
- Class: Bacilli
- Order: Lactobacillales
- Family: Lactobacillaceae
- Genus: Lactobacillus
- Species: L. gasseri

Binomial name
- Lactobacillus gasseri Lauer and Kandler 1980

Species of bacterium

Lactobacillus gasseri is a species in the genus Lactobacillus identified in 1980 by François Gasser and his associates.

L. gasseri is a normal inhabitant of the intestines of men and women and lower reproductive tract in healthy women. It is one of the four main species of Lactobacillus considered to be the major part of the vaginal microbiota, along with Lactobacillus crispatus, Lactobacillus jensenii, and Lactobacillus iners.

Lactobacillus gasseri produces gassericin A, a bacteriocin. It also produces Lactocillin.

Its 1.89 Mbp genome was sequenced in 2008.

Its strain Lg-36 eliminates C. difficile infection after taking antibiotics.

== Relation to humans ==
=== Visceral fat ===
Multiple studies have reported that L. gasseri (specifically strains BNR17 and SBT2055) may reduce visceral fat, body weight, and waist circumference by decreasing fat absorption. Daily consumption over 12 weeks can lead to significant reductions in abdominal fat areas in human adults.
