= Lactobacillus crispatus =

Scientific classification
- Domain: Bacteria
- Kingdom: Bacillati
- Phylum: Bacillota
- Class: Bacilli
- Order: Lactobacillales
- Family: Lactobacillaceae
- Genus: Lactobacillus
- Species: L. crispatus

Binomial name
- Lactobacillus crispatus (Brygoo and Aladame 1953); Moore and Holdeman 1970

Species of bacterium

Lactobacillus crispatus is an aerotolerant, gram-positive, catalase-negative, non-spore forming, rod shaped, lactic acid producing bacteria. It is host adapted and commonly found in the vagina and in the vertebrate gastrointestinal tract and is thought to be beneficial to health.

Some strains are commercially available as a probiotic that can be used by women to maintain a healthy vaginal microbiota. Another strain, CTV-05 is being evaluated specifically for the prevention and treatment of bacterial vaginosis, which is characterized by overgrowth of other bacteria, potentially as a result of the absence of Lactobacillus flora that can serve to protect the host from infection.

== History ==
The species name derives from Latin crispatus, meaning "curled", referring to the shape of the bacteria. L. crispatus was first isolated in 1953 by Brygoo and Aladame, who proposed it as a new species of the genus Eubacterium. In the 1970s the type strain VPI 3199 (ATCC 33820) of L. crispatus (at the time still designated "Eubacterium crispatum") was deposited in the collection of the Anaerobe Laboratory, Virginia Polytechnic Institute and State University (VPI), where it was identified as a Lactobacillus and characterized by Moore and Holdeman.

Addressing the problem of genetic heterogeneity among a vast number of strains identified as L. acidophilus based on phenotypic similarity, Johnson et al. performed DNA homology experiments on 89 previously proposed L. acidophilus strains and delineated six distinct homology groups. Only the strains pertaining to DNA homology group A1 were still designated L. acidophilus. Strains in the homology groups A2, A3, A4, B1 and B2 were proposed to be distinct species and later reclassified as L. crispatus, L. amylovorus, L. gallinarum, L. gasseri and L. johnsonii respectively. In the case of L. crispatus this happened in 1983 as Cato and her coworkers recharacterized strain VPI 3199 and discovered 100% DNA homology with VPI 7635 (ATCC 33197), the type strain of "L. acidophilus" group A2.

== Taxonomy ==
It is a species in the phylum Bacillota, in the class Bacilli, in the order Lactobacillales, in the family Lactobacillaceae and the genus Lactobacillus. Previously, it is one of over 200 other species identified within the genus, though the majority were reassigned to new genera in 2020.

Lactobacillus crispatus remains within the Lactobacillus genus after the 2020 reclassification because its strain- and species-level traits align within the core Lactobacillus lineage and its ecological niche, rather than with the newly defined non-Lactobacillus genera. Key factors include that it shares signature genes associated with mucosal adhesion and colonization as well as metabolic and bacteriocin profiles typical of Lactobacillus species like lactic acid production and antimicrobial activity. Additionally, it is host-adapted (with hosts including vertebrate gastrointestinal tracts and human vaginas) and its conserved core-genome groups closely with the Lactobacillus clade.

== Genome ==
Even within L. crispatus there is substantial genetic variation: strains of L. crispatus have genome sizes ranging from 1.83 to 2.7 Mb, and encode 1,839 (EM-LC1) to 2,688 (FB077-07) proteins.

Different L. crispatus strains possess host and body site-specific adaptations that enable it to thrive in distinct ecological niches such as the human vaginal tract and the poultry gut.

Comparative genomic analyses of 105 L. crispatus strains from human and poultry origins reveal that, strains cluster distinctly by host species and body site while maintaining a conserved core genome. Vaginal isolates of L. crispatus contain many genes related to acid tolerance, redox activity, carbohydrate-binding molecules, and mechanisms to cope with oxidative stress. Meanwhile, gut-derived strains from humans and poultry contain many genes involved in carbohydrate metabolism, CRISPR-Cas immune system types, prophage sequences, and surface structures like pili.

== Ecology ==
Lactobacillus crispatus was originally isolated from a pouch in a chicken gullet and is considered to be one of the strongest H_{2}O_{2}-producing lactobacilli. Its niche is characterized by nutrient-rich, microaerophilic to anaerobic conditions and is a normal inhabitant of the lower reproductive tract in healthy women as well as the gastrointestinal tract of vertebrates, namely humans, chickens and turkeys. Functionally, like other lactic acid-producing bacteria, it may prevent infections through production of lactic acid, thereby lowering the pH (typically below 4.5).

Like many other Lactobacillus species, it can be severely altered by changes to the immune system, hormone levels and from the use of antimicrobials.

== Probiotic use ==
Many scientific studies in humans are being conducted with different Lactobacillus crispatus strains to test for the prevention of recurrent bacterial vaginosis, urinary tract infections, and preterm birth.

One example, CTV-05 gelatin suppository capsules (LACTIN-V) are inserted into the vagina as a probiotic that can help maintain a healthy microbiome. Studies have shown that L. crispastus CTV-05 effectively colonized the vagina and helped prevent and treat recurrent bacterial vaginosis and other genital infections. Scientists have stated that evidence from clinical trials suggests that these probiotics will safely and effectively treat bacterial vaginosis if used alone or alongside an antibiotic treatment if an infection had already arisen.

In poultry, L. crispatus supplementation either alone or together with other Lactobacillus species is being tested to determine whether there are beneficial effects regarding inflammation, dysbiosis and production metrics.
