= Mutansucrase =

Enzyme

Identifiers
- EC no.: 2.4.1.372

Databases
- BRENDA: enzyme data
- ExPASy: NiceZyme view
- KEGG: enzyme entry
- MetaCyc: metabolic pathway
- Rhea: reactions
- PDB structures: RCSB PDB PDBe PDBsum
- Gene Ontology: AmiGO / QuickGO
Search
- PMC: articles
- PubMed: articles
- NCBI: proteins

Mutansucrase is a glucansucrase that transfers a D-glycosyl residue to a glucan chain from a sucrose molecule. The enzyme breaks down sucrose into D-fructose and D-glucose. Glucose is then added to a growing chain by mutansucrase in an ɑ-(1→3) glycosidic linkage making an insoluble glucan. The gene that encodes for Mutansucrase is called gtfJ in a manner similar to other glucosyltransferases.

== Synthesis mechanisms ==
Mutansucrase is a crucial enzyme produced by Streptococcus mutans, involved in the synthesis of both soluble and insoluble glucans from sucrose. One notable aspect of its behavior is its tendency to aggregate alongside dextransucrase when precipitated by ammonium sulfate from the culture fluid of S. mutans. This aggregation leads to the gradual release of less aggregated glucosyltransferase activities, including mutansucrase, suggesting a complex regulatory mechanism within the bacterial system.

Mutansucrase, alongside dextransucrase, exhibits the ability to catalyze the synthesis of both water-soluble and insoluble glucans from sucrose. The rates of synthesis for these glucans depend on the enzyme concentration, with higher concentrations favoring the production of insoluble glucans. This concentration-dependent behavior sheds light on the intricate control mechanisms governing glucan synthesis pathways in S. mutans.

Moreover, the sensitivity of the glucans synthesized by mutansucrase to hydrolysis by mutanase and dextranase provides further insights into their structural and functional properties. Insoluble glucans synthesized by mutansucrase display higher sensitivity to mutanase, while soluble glucans are more extensively hydrolyzed by dextranase. These differential sensitivities hint at distinct roles or structures of the glucans synthesized by mutansucrase.

Additionally, mutansucrase exhibits variation in molecular weight and aggregation behavior. Notably, in the presence of 1.55M ammonium sulfate, part of the mutansucrase activity sediments rapidly as a high molecular weight aggregate, suggesting a potential role for environmental factors in modulating enzyme behavior.

Interconvertible forms of mutansucrase are responsible for synthesizing both soluble and insoluble glucans. The aggregated form favors (1→3)-alpha bond formation, while dissociating during gel filtration to the dextransucrase form, which predominantly catalyzes (1→6)-alpha bond formation.

== Formation of dental caries ==
The high use of mutansucrase by S. mutans causes more cariogenic damage. In the presence of sucrose, mutansucrase from oral bacteria may synthesize extracellular water-insoluble glucans that cause dental plaque.

== Inhibitors ==
Recently, some research has been done to find inhibitors that would slow the formation of insoluble glucans made by mutansucrase to decrease the ability of S. mutans to form biofilms leading to dental carries. There is evidence that mutansucrase is inhibited competitively by rubusoside. Non-digestible isomaltooligosaccharides (NDIMOS) have also been shown to inhibit mutansucrase by taking the place of a glucosyl acceptor. Quercetin which is a flavonol that is produced in plants can inhibit mutansucrase noncompetively and suppress the virulence factor of S. mutans without effecting the normal oral flora.

Cellobio-oligosaccharides (CBO) as an inhibitor is determined by the presence of sucrose. Insoluble glucans found in mutansucrase can be compared with synthesized glucans that remain in culture when CBO and mutansucrase are incubated together at 37 degrees Celsius. The ratio of synthesized glucans to insoluble-glucans dictates the inhibitory qualities of CBO on mutansucrase.
