= Limosilactobacillus pontis =

Scientific classification
- Domain: Bacteria
- Kingdom: Bacillati
- Phylum: Bacillota
- Class: Bacilli
- Order: Lactobacillales
- Family: Lactobacillaceae
- Genus: Limosilactobacillus
- Species: L. pontis

Binomial name
- Limosilactobacillus pontis (Vogel et al. 1994) Zheng et al. 2020

Type strain
- ATCC 51518; CCUG 33456; CIP 104232; DSM 8475; JCM 11051; LMG 14187; LTH 2587

Synonyms
- Lactobacillus pontis Vogel et al. 1994

Species of bacterium

Limosilactobacillus pontis is a rod-shaped, Gram-positive facultatively anaerobic bacterium. Along with other Lactobacillus species, it is capable of converting sugars, such as lactose, into lactic acid. Limosilactobacillus pontis is classified under the phylum Bacillota, class Bacilli, and is a member of the family Lactobacillaceae and is found to be responsible for the fermentation of sourdough, along with many other Lactobacillus species. This microorganism produces lactic acid during the process of fermentation, which gives sourdough bread its characteristic sour taste.

== History and discovery ==
In 1994, Limosilactobacillus pontis was discovered during an experiment focusing on the microflora found in sourdough preparations for making sourdough bread. Scientists isolated Limosilactobacillus pontis as well as many common species such as Limosilactobacillus reuteri, Levilactobacillus brevis, and Fructilactobacillus sanfranciscensis by investigating protein patterns in cells, physiological features, and running 16S rRNA sequences to look at each Lactobacillus species separately. An isolate from rye sourdough was discovered to be a new species by reason of protein configurations, physiological features, and by GC-content.

== Phylogeny ==
Limosilactobacillus pontis was classified as a new species based on the 16S rRNA gene sequence. Strain LTH 2587^{T}, also known as DSM 8475/ LMG 14187, was the first strain discovered and named.

Other strain names include the following: ATCC 51518, CCM 4540, CCUG 33456, CIP 104232, JCM 11051, KCTC 5074, NCIMB 13406, and VTT E-052865.

== Use in food production ==
Limosilactobacillus pontis is used in the starter for making sourdough bread. The starter consists of water, flour, yeast, and the starter culture of bacteria. The bacteria begin fermentation by breaking down the sugars, forming lactic acid in the process. This process lowers the pH of the solution, producing a "sour" taste in the final product. Limosilactobacillus pontis breaks down sugars that cannot be metabolized by the yeast in the culture, just as many Lactobacillus species do. When wheat flour and water are in solution together, the amylase enzymes present breakdown the starch into maltose, and maltase performs a further breakdown into glucose. The lactic acid producing bacteria are responsible for breaking down sugars and the yeast uses by-products from this process to form carbon dioxide. The carbon dioxide causes leavening in the dough.

Species of sourdough lactobacilli exhibit unique technological properties related to the flavor, texture, and shelf-life of sourdough bread. Limosilactobacillus pontis expresses genes coding for Cystathionine lyase (Cxl), which contributes to the development of flavor in the process of cheese ripening and it is shown to improve the taste and flavor of bread.

Exopolysaccharides (EPS) produced by lactic acid bacteria are used as alternative biothickeners for viscosification, stabilization, emulsification, and gelling in a variety of food products. EPS are generally classified in two groups: homopolysaccharides (HoPS), commonly known as glucose or fructose polymers, and heteropolysaccharides. Currently only HoPS have been shown to be useful in making bread. Various sourdough-associated lactic acid bacteria synthesize glucans and fructans by extracellular glucansucrases or fructansucrases, respectively. L. pontis, L. panis, L. reuteri, Limosilactobacillus frumenti and F. sanfranciscensis have been shown to produce fructans (levan or inulin) and glucans (dextran, reuteran or mutan).

== Genomics ==
Limosilactobacillus pontis LTH 2585 and LTH 2586 possess a GC content of 53%. Strain LTH 2587 was determined to have a 53.3% GC content.

Limosilactobacillus pontis strain LTH 2587 16S rRNA gene sequenced at 1570 base pairs.

Limosilactobacillus pontis strain DSM 8475 16S rRNA-23S rRNA small intergenic spacer was also sequenced at 207 base pairs along with the large intergenic spacer, tRNA-Ile, and tRNA-Ala genes at 403 base pairs for the complete sequence.

Other genes that have been sequenced include the following:

Partial pheS gene for phenylalanyl-tRNA synthase alpha subunit for strain LMG 14188 and strain LMG 14187T.

Partial tuf gene for elongation factor tu, type strain DSM 8474T.

Partial recA gene for recombinase A, strain LMG 14187T.

Complete rpoA gene for RNA polymerase alpha subunit, type strain LMG 14187T.

== Physiology ==
The sourdough lactobacilli including Fructilactobacillus sanfranciscensis, L. pontis, Limosilactobacillus panis, Lactiplantibacillus paraplantarum, Companilactobacillus mindensis are considered typical to sourdough environments, especially with an extended fermentation period and/or higher temperatures. Limosilactobacillus pontis seems to remain dominant for a long time during continuous propagation of sourdoughs suggesting their essential role for fermentation. Additionally, they are enriched during continuous dough propagation. Their persistence ascribes to their competitive metabolisms and adaptation to this environment.

The following are some factors contributing to their dominance/persistence in sourdough fermentation. Firstly, their carbohydrate metabolism is highly adapted to the main energy sources in dough, maltose and fructose. Use of maltose via maltose phosphorylase and the pentose phosphate shunt with fructose as co-substrate results in a higher energy yield than homofermentative maltose degradation. Secondly, the temperature and pH for their growth fit the conditions of sourdough fermentation. The persistent coexistence of these microorganisms in the same context may result from their similar growth rates, in turn determined by temperature and pH. Thirdly, they own some stress response mechanisms to overcome high/low temperatures, high dehydration/osmolarity, acid, oxidation, and starvation. Finally, they produce antimicrobial compounds, such as organic acids (lactate, acetate, and others), bacteriocins, and reutericyclin to enhance their competitiveness against a wide range of bacteria. However, the temperature is an important factor strongly impacting the competitiveness of lactobacilli in sourdough fermentation. For example, at a high temperature of 40 °C, L. frumenti and L. panis are dominating over L. pontis and L. reuteri.

The sourdough lactic acid bacteria's response to high salt concentration is species specific. In general, obligate heterofermentative lactobacilli are more sensitive to NaCl compared to other lactobacilli. For instance, L. pontis and F. sanfranciscensis are inhibited by 4% NaCl, while L. paraplantarum and Lactobacillus amylovorus can tolerate up to 6% NaCl.

== Metabolism ==
The most primary metabolic activity of these microorganisms in sourdough is to produce acid and carbon dioxide; gas production is necessary for the dough leavening if yeast is not added.

Limosilactobacillus pontis is capable of using fructose as a carbon source and convert stoichiometrically convert fructose to lactic acid and ethanol. However, when maltose is present, they use it chiefly as an electron acceptor, and fructose is reduced to mannitol. It can also metabolize ribose, D-raffinose, and gluconate, but cannot use glucose, L-arabinose, D-xylose, galactose, aesculin, lactose or melibiose. Its main products from fermenting fructose or maltose are lactate, acetate, ethanol, glycerol, and carbon dioxide. Limosilactobacillus pontis cannot use citrate as an electron acceptor in the presence of maltose. There is also no presence of catalase activity.

Limosilactobacillus pontis has the ability to catabolize arginine. Three enzymes are involved in the process; including arginine deaminase (ADI), ornithine carbamoyltransferase (OTC), and carbamate kinase (CK). A fourth protein located at the cell membrane acts as transporter, allowing the antiporter exchange between arginine and ornithine.

== Probiotics ==
A probiotic organism such as Limosilactobacillus pontis, and other lactobacilli, help by balancing numbers of normal microflora in the human body. Probiotics also give some protection against pathogens, lower levels of cholesterol, cause stimulation of the immune response, and in some cases, protect against specific types of cancer.

There are potential health benefits by using these lactobacilli in commercial food products such as the lactic acid fermented beverage hardaliye, which is made from the natural fermentation of the red grape or grape juice.

Limosilactobacillus pontis has the ability to induce NOD2 pathway where NOD2 plays a key role in the immune system by recognizing bacterial molecules and stimulating an immune reaction. NOD2 is a nucleotide-binding oligomerization domain-containing protein, which is also known as caspase recruitment domain. It may commonly be referred to as an Inflammatory bowel disease protein.
