= Reuteransucrase =

Identifiers
- Organism: Limosilactobacillus reuteri strain 121
- Symbol: gtfA
- Alt. symbols: GTFA
- Orthologs: OMA: entry
- PDB: 4AMC
- RefSeq (Prot): WP_225358574.1
- UniProt: Q5SBL9

Other data
- EC number: 2.4.1.395
- Chromosome: Genome: 0.27 - 0.28 Mb
Search for
- Structures: Swiss-model
- Domains: InterPro

Reuteransucrase

Identifiers
- EC no.: 2.4.1.395

Databases
- BRENDA: enzyme data
- ExPASy: NiceZyme view
- KEGG: enzyme entry
- MetaCyc: metabolic pathway
- Rhea: reactions
- PDB structures: RCSB PDB PDBe PDBsum
Search
- PMC: articles
- PubMed: articles
- NCBI: proteins

Reuteransucrase is an enzyme that catalyzes the formation of an exopolysaccharide reuteran from the sugar sucrose. This enzyme is produced in the bacterial species Limosilactobacillus reuteri. The bacterium uses the enzyme to synthesize free sugars (reuteran) which are later consumed by the bacteria for metabolic processes. Reueransucrase has two mechanisms of reaction, hydrolysis and transglycosylation.

== Reaction and Mechanism ==
Reuteransucrase is an extracellular glucansucrase, a type of glucosyltransferase. It uses sucrose as a glucosyl donor. It is named for its product, reuteran, a branched α-glucan containing both α(1→4) and α(1→6) glycosidic linkages.

The enzyme cleaves sucrose, releasing D-fructose and forming a covalently bound glucosyl–enzyme reaction intermediate. The fate of this intermediate depends on the acceptor. In hydrolysis, water acts as the acceptor and free D-glucose is released. In transglycosylation, the enzyme transfers the glucosyl group to a carbohydrate acceptor. Repeated transfer to the non-reducing end of a growing glucan chain produces reuteran. The non-branching sections of the glucan chains are made up of α(1→4) glycosidic links and branching areas are made up of α(1→6) glycosidic links.

Reuteransucrase contains three amino acid residues that form a catalytic triad. Asp453 acts as a catalytic nucleophile, Glu491 as an acid-base catalyst, and Asp564 as a transition state stabilizer.

Sucrose hydrolysis (1) releases glucose and fructose. Transglycosylation (2) is illustrated for an α(1→4) linkage. The diagram depicts free glucose in step 2, but the glucosyl group is transferred from a covalent glucosyl–enzyme intermediate.

== Function in Bacteria ==
The most notable bacteria containing reuteransucrase is Lactobacillus reuteri, this bacterium produces a branched exopolysaccharide chain known as reuterans. Reuteransucrase is the enzyme that synthesizes reuteran. This enzyme is also called glucansucrase/glucosyltransferase and GTFA. Reuteransucrase is secreted extracellularly by the bacterium L. reuteri where it cleaves sucrose into fructose and glucose. It then creates gluco-oligosaccharides and chains of individual glucose molecules. This enzyme also contributes to the formation of biofilms and aggregation of cells in the gastro intestinal tracts of mammals. The importance of function of reuteransucrase is found when a deletion of the gene that codes for the Gtf proteins results in a loss of the glucan binding in the mutant strains.
