= Limosilactobacillus vaginalis =

Scientific classification
- Domain: Bacteria
- Kingdom: Bacillati
- Phylum: Bacillota
- Class: Bacilli
- Order: Lactobacillales
- Family: Lactobacillaceae
- Genus: Limosilactobacillus
- Species: L. vaginalis

Binomial name
- Limosilactobacillus vaginalis (Embley et al. 1989) Zheng et al. 2020

Synonyms
- Lactobacillus vaginalis Embley et al. 1989

Species of bacterium

Limosilactobacillus vaginalis is a lactic acid bacterium that is a normal, but infrequent part of the vaginal microbiome.

== Discovery and taxonomy ==
The species was identified by Embley and his coworkers in the course of a vaccine development against trichomoniasis. The vaginal secretions of women suffering from trichomoniasis were examined for the presence of certain proposed Lactobacillus strains exhibiting mutualistic behavior with Trichomonas vaginalis, facilitating sustainment of infection. The isolates initially designated Limosilactobacillus fermentum were compared to the reference strains of a number of heterofermentative species using the DNA–DNA hybridization method, and have shown a maximal DNA homology of 35% with Limosilactobacillus reuteri, far below the standard threshold of 70% recommended for species delineation. The new species L. vaginalis with type strain NCTC 12197 was proposed, and the description of its carbohydrate fermentation patterns as well as cellular fatty acid composition were provided. Further taxonomic investigations relying on 16S rRNA gene sequence analysis placed L. vaginalis in the L. reuteri phylogenetic group along with 14 other species, including L. fermentum.

== Description ==
Limosilactobacillus vaginalis is a Gram-positive, facultatively anaerobic, catalase negative bacterium. These obligate heterofermentative lactobacilli produce both D and L isomers of lactic acid as the metabolic end-product of carbohydrate fermentation. Similarly to most other vaginal Lactobacillus species, L. vaginalis does not directly metabolize glycogen, but rather its depolymerization products. The bacterium occurs in less than 1% of healthy women.

== Use ==
Specific strains of L. vaginalis characterized by an insufficient protective efficacy against vaginal pathogens are used in lactobacillus vaccines, a therapy method of chronic vaginal infections that respond poorly to antibiotic treatment, available in German-speaking Europe. L. vaginalis is not used as a probiotic, nor as a starter culture in the food industry. It is occasionally isolated from fermented dairy products, where it represents an unwanted contaminant.
