= Limosilactobacillus mucosae =

Scientific classification
- Domain: Bacteria
- Kingdom: Bacillati
- Phylum: Bacillota
- Class: Bacilli
- Order: Lactobacillales
- Family: Lactobacillaceae
- Genus: Limosilactobacillus
- Species: L. mucosae

Binomial name
- Limosilactobacillus mucosae Roos et al. 2000

Species of bacterium

Limosilactobacillus mucosae is a rod shaped species of lactic acid bacteria first isolated from pig intestines. It has mucus-binding activity. The species is an obligate anaerobe, catalase-negative, doesn't form spores and is non-motile. Its type strain is S32T, and has been found to be most closely related to Limosilactobacillus reuteri.

== History ==
Limosilactobacillus mucosae was unexpectedly discovered by researchers from the Department of Microbiology at the Swedish University of Agricultural Sciences while trying to isolate new strains of Limosilactobacillus reuteri from the intestines of pigs. The experiment in which the organism was isolated used a gene probe derived from a cell-surface protein believed to aid in mucus-binding activity. The gene that encodes for this protein is referred to as the Mub gene, and the purpose of the experiment was to link the presence of the Mub gene with mucus-binding activity.

== Name and classification ==
The name Limosilactobacillus mucosae is derived from the Latin terms lacto, bacillus, and mūcōsus, meaning 'slimy milk-bacteria'. The species name mucosae refers to the mucus binding colonization factor gene mub found in L. mucosae and the related Lactobacillus reuteri.

There are over 60 lactobacilli species known, many of which have been isolated from animal gastrointestinal tracts. Examples of other lactobacilli isolated from pig intestines include L. fermentum, L. acidophilus, and L. reuteri.

== Characteristics ==
Limosilactobacillus mucosae is an obligate anaerobe; the ideal growth conditions include the absence of oxygen, but there is still weak growth present with oxygen. This organism is Gram-positive, non-motile, non-sporeforming, catalase-negative rods that range from 2-4 μm in length. The cells can be observed singly, in pairs, or in short chains. The cell wall contains Orn-D-Asp type peptidoglycan which is indicated by the presence of ornithine and aspartic acid. The optimum temperature for growth would be that found in the intestines of a healthy pig, about 37 °C. The cells are obligate heterofermentators and can produce D- and L-lactic acid utilizing glucose, ribose, maltose, and saccharose as carbon sources.

Many lactobacilli, including L. mucosae, have a gene that codes for a cell surface mucus binding protein known as mub. This protein binds to components in pig intestinal mucus. This adhesion protein is required for the bacteria to survive in an open flow environment like the gastrointestinal tract.

== Genomics ==
There are several strains of L. mucosae that have been isolated. Of these strains, only one genome has been completely characterized; Limosilactobacillus mucosae LM1. Limosilactobacillus mucosae LM1 was isolated from the feces of healthy piglets. This stain was found to have 2,213,697 base pairs, a G+C content of 45.87%, 2,039 protein-coding genes, and 56 tRNA-encoding genes. Of these genes 64.6% have been assigned functions, 8.7% of which were found to be unique to this particular strain.

== Phylogeny ==
Using 16S rRNA, L. mucosae strains S14 and S32^{T} sequences have been completely characterized based on genotypic traits, and partially determined for strains 1028, 1031, and 1035, isolated in 1987, and previously unclassified strains S5, S15, and S17 are also partially sequenced. Analysis of the 5' and 3' ends of the genes revealed that all isolates were members of the same species. Molecular GC-content, Cell wall analysis, and DNA-DNA hybridization also indicated that these strains were members of a new species and not L. reuteri.

Strain S32^{T} was found to be identical to S14, and used to determine similarity rank among other lactobacilli. Using the Ribosomal Database Project, the entire 16S rRNA sequence of the S32^{T} strain was compared to other known lactobacilli. The highest similarity rank was found with L. reuteri, at 95.1% similarity, followed by L. pontis and L. fermentum with respective similarities of 94.6% and 94.4%. A Phylogenetic analysis confirmed this relationship.

Other strains of L. mucosae have been isolated from human feces, referred to as ME-340, human intestine and vagina, the intestines of dogs, calves, and horses, and the stomach mucosa of breast-fed lamb, strain D.

== Special functions ==
The intestinal epithelium helps protect the intestinal mucosa from the external environment and luminal contents. Tight junctions are intercellular complexes that facilitate the low level of permeability present in the intestinal epithelial layer by monitoring the movement of materials between the intestinal lumen and the intestinal mucosa. Enterotoxins released by pathogens, in particular TNF-ct, result in an increase in the level of epithelial permeability. Limosilactobacillus mucosae strain ME-340 expressing the gene Lam29, which encodes for a protein that is believed to be related to the cysteine-binding transporter, shows a significant adhesion for human blood group A and B antigens. Many pathogens show a high affinity for these same blood group antigens in the gastrointestinal tract. Limosilactobacillus mucosae ME-340, and other strains including the patented CNCM 1-4429 strain, have been shown to decrease epithelial permeability and improve epithelial barrier function. The presence of this organism provides competitive exclusion against many of these pathogenic organisms and help with the development of new probiotic food products. Increased epithelial activity is also one of the contributing factors to many intestinal disorders. Among these disorders is celiac disease, irritable bowel syndrome, and Crohn's disease. There is also significant antimicrobial activity to protect against pathogens exhibited in strain LM1. Analysis of this activity, as well as the activity of epithelial cell and mucin adhesion genes, is underway.
