= Sucrose:1,6-, 1,3-α-D-glucan 3-α- and 6-α-D-glucosyltransferase =

Sucrose:1,6-, 1,3-α-D-glucan 3-α- and 6-α-D-glucosyltransferase may refer to:-

- Sucrose—1,6-alpha-glucan 3(6)-alpha-glucosyltransferase, an enzyme
- Alternansucrase, an enzyme
