= Pulpwood =

Timber intended for processing into wood pulp

Pulpwood is timber that is ground and processed into a fibrous pulp. It is a versatile natural resource commonly used for paper-making but also made into low-grade wood and used for chips, energy, pellets, and engineered products.

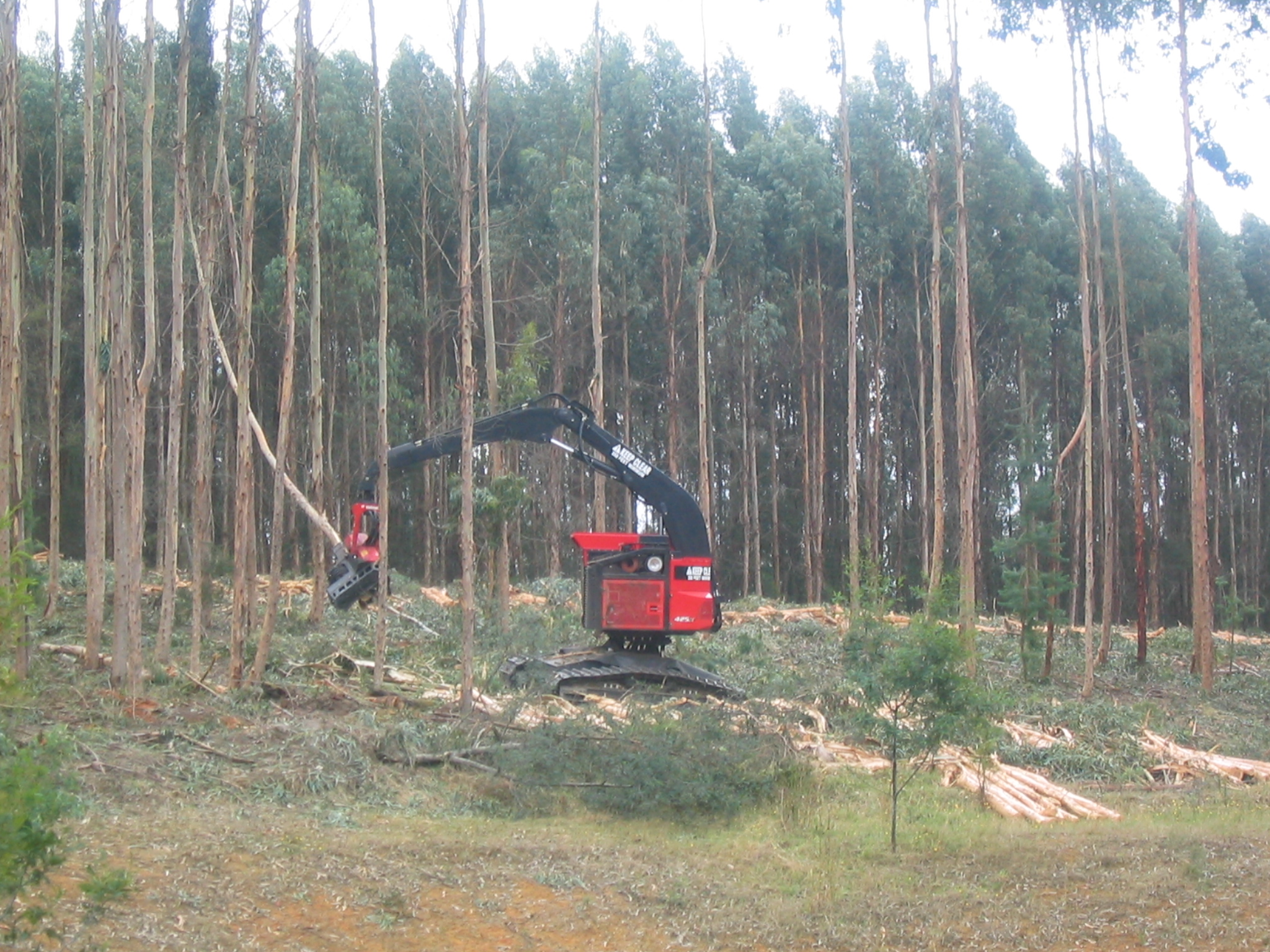
Harvesting a stand of eucalyptus pulpwood in Australia.

Pulpwood can be derived from most types of trees. Categorizing trees into hardwood and softwood is the easiest way to characterize types of paper produced from pulpwood.

Hardwoods are raw material that are preferred for pulp used in printing papers. It has small dimensions in its fibres, which can be useful for small-scale uniformity, opacity, and surface smoothness, all important for printing paper.

Softwoods are the preferred raw material for strong papers, due to the length and slimness of the fibres. Low-density softwoods, such as firs with thin-walled fibres are preferred for papers with high demands for bonding-related strength characteristics. Some of these characteristics include tensile, burst, and surface strength.

Trees raised specifically for pulp production account for 15% of world pulp production, while old growth forests account for 9% and second/third plus generation forests account for the balance.

== Hardwood applications ==
Hardwood has anatomical structural differences to softwood, which influences physical properties, durability, workability, and bonding. Different types of cells complete the three main tasks in hardwoods compared to softwoods. The main tasks include stabilization, water conduit, and storage.

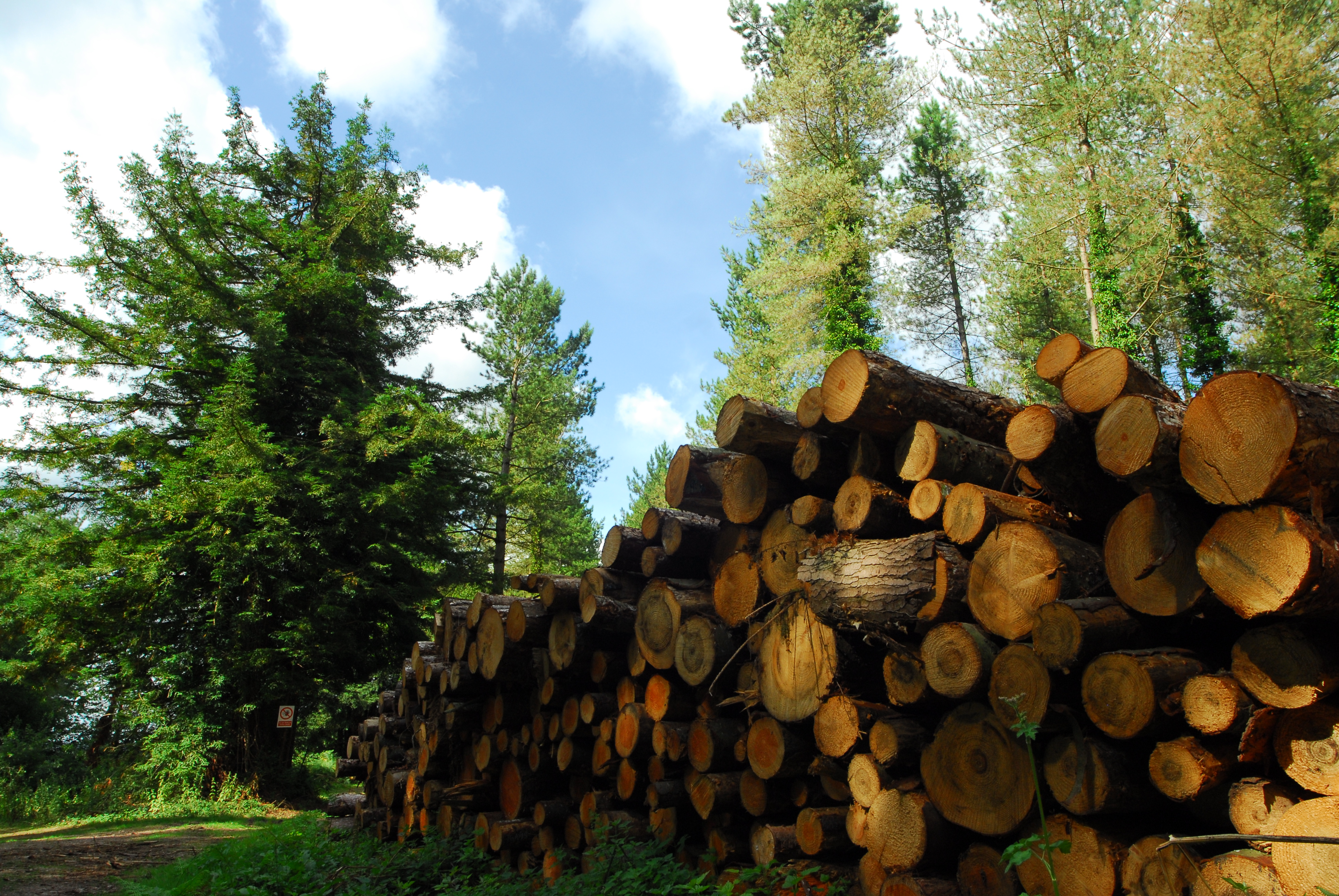
A pile of pulpwood to show one of the first steps of producing paper

Hardwood applications can be sectioned into four areas:

- Solid wood products
- Wood-based materials
- Use after modification
- Supplemental services

=== Solid wood products ===
Hardwoods (such as oak) are the preferred raw material for joists, roof structures and timber frames. The use of solid hardwoods has decreased during the last couple centuries, most likely due to the development of wood-based materials that allow for larger constructions not limited to the size of trees.

Trees of any size can be used for pulpwood, but trees that are 5–9 inches in diameter at breast height are normally used. These trees are cut after a saw timber harvest or as a separate operation to thin a crowded stand. Low-quality stands are completely harvested for pulpwood to regenerate the forest to more desirable species, as well as larger trees with disease or defects that prevent their use for lumber.

Additional fields of application include playgrounds, wood-facings, railway sleepers, bridges, and more. Furniture is another application of hardwood. Furniture made of pure solid wood is relatively rare. Most parts of furniture such as table boards, shelves or cabinet doors belong to wood-based materials because of their glued components. Solid wood can be used for chairs, tables, beds, upholstery frames, sideboards, cabinets, bathtubs, and more.

Hardwood is also used for interior work, such as parquet flooring, doors, and windows. Hardwood is especially preferred for parquet flooring. Tree species in darker colours are commonly used to give the flooring a "used look," for visual appeal. Solid wood is used for front doors and windows, while internal doors are mainly made of wood-based panels.

=== Wood-based materials ===
Wood-based materials can be separated into a few different types. These include solid wood, ply, particle, and fibre materials. Solid wood materials are used as beam or panels. Typical tree species used for solid wood materials include beech, oak, birch, alder and chestnut. Hardwoods are commonly used for nonstructural products such as plywood.

Structural products such as cross laminated timber, are mainly composed of softwoods. Particle materials are ideal to use low-rate timber assortments and saw mill waste. Types of particle materials include particle board, mineral-bonded wood composites, oriented strand board, laminated strand lumber, and oriented strand lumber.

Fibre materials include fibreboards, insulating fibreboards, wood particle mouldings and wood plastic composites. The quality and processing of fibreboards and insulating fibreboards are influenced by the fibre percentage, the geometrical structural of the fibre, and the specific chemical composition of wood. The fibres of hardwoods are short, smooth and thin, and are suited for the dry production process because they do not mat. Ironically, hardwoods are barely used for fibreboards and insulating fibreboards.

=== Use after modification ===
The purposes of wood modification are dimensional stabilization and resistance increase. Wood can be modified in a multitude of ways, including but not limited to: chemical modification, heat treatment, ammonia treatment, electrodialysis, and more.

Chemical modification, heat treatment, and impregnation (with salts, metals, monomers and polymers) are the most used methods.

=== Supplemental services ===
Hardwood can be used in other ways outside of physical wood structures and paper. It can be used as a substance, such as through food production. The sawdust of beech and oak is used to grow edible mushrooms. Oak, beech and maple are used to cure meat or fish, while oak staves, chips and powder add aroma to wine. The sawdust of oak and robinia can be used to filter elements such as copper, nickel, zinc and cadmium. It can also be added to plastics. 60% of linoleum flooring consists of sawdust.

Wood can also be used as an energy source, with sawmill waste and low-rate timber. Combustion, wood gasification, and production of bioethanol are the three main ways hardwood is used for energy.

Combustion: split billets, chips and wood pellets. High-density wood species burn down slower, and the heat value depends on wood moisture content. Burning rate decreases with increasing density.

Wood gasification (synthetic natural gas and biomass to liquid): synthesis gas production is done by wood smouldering.

Bioethanol: start off by the splitting of cellulose and hemicelluloses in sugar by enzymes and acids, then the fermentation of the sugar with the aid of microorganisms. Lastly, the distillation and dewatering creates the bioethanol.

== Softwood applications ==
Softwoods come from gymnosperm trees that also grow needles and cones. When a sample of softwood is observed under a microscope, they appear to have no (visible) pores because of the presence of tracheids. Tracheids are a primitive element of xylem (fluid-conducting tissues). They consist of a single elongated cell and a secondary cellulosic wall containing a thick layer of lignin. Medullary rays and tracheids transport water and produce sap. Approximately 80% of timber comes from softwood, such as cedar trees, Douglas fir, juniper, pine, and many more.

Although they are called 'softwood' trees, they are not actually softer (in texture) in comparison to hardwood trees. The term just refers to wood that comes from gymnosperms or conifers. Some hardwood trees are even softer than specific softwood tree species.

Softwoods are used in wood manufacturing as well, and are sometimes preferred over hardwoods depending on the product being constructed. An important characteristic that softwoods have that make them a suitable pulpwood to build with, is that they can easily absorb any kind of finish. They can become very resistant and last for a long time (centuries). Softwoods tend to be cheaper than hardwood due to their growth rate and development being faster. They are versatile, strong, and can be managed easily. Some of the biggest softwood forests can be found in Canada, Scandinavia, and Russia.

=== Types of softwoods ===
Cedarwood: One of the most resistance and durable softwoods. Cedarwood is originally from the Mediterranean area and is highly resistant to water, bacteria, fungi, and insects. Their impressive resistance ability comes from the woods natural scent, which is sweet and pleasant. Its insect-repellent properties make cedar-wood ideal for the manufacturing of internal furniture, such as chests, boxes, and closets. The woods insulating properties make it suitable to be used for roofing material. Western Red Cedar is used to make musical instruments such as guitars and violins, due to its colour and resistance to warping and cracking.

Pinewood: Mostly found in the Northern Hemisphere, this type of wood is mainly used for domestic applications. It is resistance to shrinkage, swelling, and warping. It is used for outdoor wooden projects, such as decks. A disadvantage of pinewood is that over time, the wood could splinter, and items constructed from the specific type of pinewood used for making outdoor furniture/decks should be checked annually to prevent any risks to the people using them.

Firwood: This type of wood comes from Douglas Fir trees, and can be found in North America, Europe, North Africa, and Asia. It is strong and resistant to abrasion, and can be used for a diverse array of products. Some include furniture, doors, windows, and larger-scale items such as bridge parts, log homes, and commercial buildings. It can also be used for boat-building and aircraft construction, due to its sturdy and stable nature.

Redwood: This is mainly used for outdoor applications because of its resistance to weather conditions, insects, and rot. As a result of these characteristics, it is a premium building wood. It is another type of wood used to build decks, because of its natural strength, stability, and lifespan (can last a long time).

== Products ==
Pulpwood can be used for a multitude of different uses, some of them already mentioned above. Some of the main products it is used for is listed below.

=== Paper ===
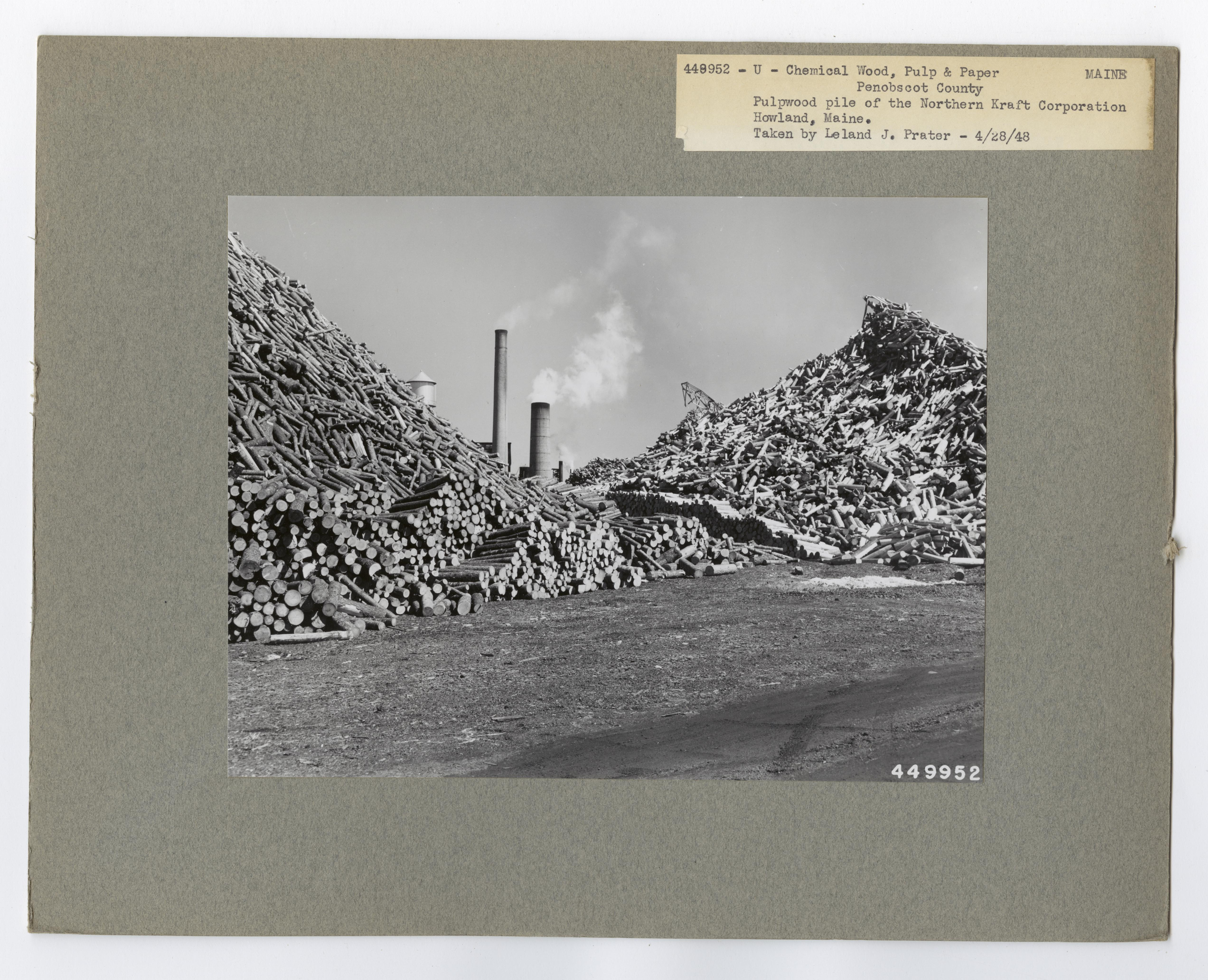
Photograph of the production process of paper with pulpwood

Paper production is the most common and main use for pulpwood. Paper can be produced from both hardwood and softwood trees, and each species for both types of trees have specific and unique properties that make the type of paper and other products produced differ. The short fibres of hardwoods trees produce smoother and more uniform paper, like printing paper. Softwood trees have longer fibres that produce industrial papers like newsprint.

Wood is broken down mechanically or chemically. After the breakdown process, fibres (composed of two kinds of cellulose) and lignin are leftover. Lignin is the glue or cement that holds the fibres in wood together. Simply putting it, wood pulp is a large amount of individual wood fibres with the lignin removed. Wood pulp is naturally between dark brown to light grey in colour. Dark brown wood pulp is used for paper bags and boxes, and bleaching the pulp produces higher grades of paper (among other products).

==== Chemical Wood Pulp ====
The chemical method of breaking down wood pulp to make paper is more commonly used and energy efficient compared to the mechanical method. In the chemical method, the wood chips are 'cooked' in large tanks. The tanks are called digesters, and are like pressure cookers. Chemicals, referred to as 'cooking liquor' help break down wood chips into a mass of fibres. The chemicals used are: 1) sulfite salts with an excess of sulfur dioxide and 2) caustic soda and sodium sulfide (kraft process). The lignin of the wood is made soluble, resulting in fibre separation into whole fibres. Further purification by bleaching can also be done. Purifying the pulp by bleaching and by alkaline extraction is called alpha or dissolving pulp. This type of pulp is used for speciality papers, for rayon and cellulose film production, and for cellulose derivatives (nitrate and acetate.)

==== Mechanical Pulp ====
With mechanical pulping, machines are used to grind wood chips into pulp, creating a pulp that retains most of its lignin. Due to the short fibres created by this process, the resulting paper is mostly used for newspapers, phone books, and other low-strength paper. Mechanical pulp can also be referred to as ground-wood pulp, and the grinding process starts by subjecting wood to an abrading action, either by pressing the wood against a revolving grinding stone or by passing chips through a mill.

Pulp grinders are usually powered by electric motors and automatically loaded. Most ground-wood pulp flows directly to an adjacent paper mill for use as stock. It is then formed into a sheet on a cylindrical vacuum filter, then pressed in a hydraulic press to a moisture content of about 50 percent. The pressed sheets result in the formation of bales.

=== Pellets ===
Pulpwood also produces wood pellets, which can be used for heating homes and electricity production. They can be formed by the grinding of biomass (in the form of unused tree tops), sawdust, or even entire trees, then compressed into small pellets to be stored, transported, and fed into boilers and furnaces. Softwood species are preferred to make wood pellets due to the resin content required to bind the particles together.

=== Firewood ===
Firewood is the oldest use of pulpwood. Poor quality trees are put to better use and burned as a crude energy source as heat, light and cooking fuels. Coppicing refers to the ancient and traditional woodland management technique that involves cutting trees at their base and creating a stool for new shoots to grow. During the Stone Age, coppicing was done to manage forests for the production of firewood fuels.

=== Biofuel ===
Biofuels refer to fuels derived from plant materials or manure. They are currently under debate whether they are a safe and environmentally friendly alternative to fossil fuels as a source of energy. The carbon in plants is produced by absorbing carbon dioxide from the atmosphere via photosynthesis, and burning biofuels/plant-derived fuels puts the same amount of CO_{2} back into the atmosphere.

Generating heat and electricity from wood-fuel is a multi step process.

1. It starts off by drying the wood, followed by pyrolysis to produce gasses.
2. Next, the gasses are purified and burnt to generate electricity

The ash created during the pyrolysis process contains nutrients that are used as plant fertilizer, but it could also contain contaminants from the soils of the trees origin site.

Some of the potential sources of wood-fuel include early thinnings from commercial plantations, the residues from timber harvesting and arboricultural activities, coppicing and sawmills.

== Sources ==
=== Logging ===
Early pulpwood operations were based on logging operations for sawn lumber. Transporting the log to the saw mill was a major problem, and using water to transport the lumber proved to be a successful tactic. Water transportation was the cheapest and only link between the mill and the tree site. As the search for accessible trees continued towards the sources of rivers, driving capacity was improved by various forms of river improvement. Dams were one of the methods of river improvement, as well as the use of impounded water to increase the natural flow of the river.

In the logging of mixed forest stands, the better trees are usually used for sawlogs for lumber production, while the inferior trees and components are harvested for pulpwood production. Pulpwood usually derives from four types of woody materials in a mixed logging operation:

- Open-grown trees, that are heavily branched low on the trunk, and so make poor sawlogs.
- Dead or diseased trees.
- Tops cut from trees harvested for sawlogs (branches are rarely used since they contain little usable wood after the bark has been removed).
- Small trees, too small to harvest for sawlogs.

Natural forest stands may also be harvested solely for pulpwood where, for various reasons, the value of the trees as sawlogs is low. This may be due to the predominant species in the forest stand (for example, some aspen forests in northern North America), or to the relative proximity of the nearest sawmill or pulp mill.

=== Plantations ===
To help feed pulp and paper mills, vast monocultures of conifers eucalyptus, acacia, and other species are being established both in the North and South, where fast tree growth, inexpensive land and labour, and lavish subsidies combine to make wood cheaper. As exotic trees invade native woodlands, grasslands, farmlands and pastures, consequences in most countries include impoverishment, environmental degradation, and rural strife.

Plantations are full of trees similar to forests, but they differ greatly. A forest is a complex, self-regenerating system, consisting of soil, water, microclimates, energy, a diverse ecosystem with a wide variety of plants and animals in mutual relation. In contrast, a commercial plantation is a cultivated area whose species and structure have been simplified dramatically to produce only a few goods, such as lumber, fuel, resin, oil or fruit. The trees in a plantation have a small range of species and ages, and require extensive and consistent human intervention.

Pulpwood is also harvested from tree farms established for the specific purpose of growing pulpwood, with little or minimal sawlog production. Monoculture of species intended specifically for pulpwood include loblolly and slash pines in the southern USA; various species of eucalyptus (most commonly Eucalyptus globulus and Eucalyptus grandis) in Latin America, Iberian Peninsula, Australia, south-east Asia.

Plantations normally replace crops, grasslands, or scrub forests. Since they are used for commercial necessities, they are established on healthy soil, with their objective being short cycles of rapid growth that requires a certain level of fertility and water supply. Therefore, they tend to occupy areas already being used by local people.

=== Salvage cuttings ===
Salvage cuts after forest fires, tornadoes, hurricanes, or other natural disasters are often used for pulpwood. An alternative source of wood for use in Kraft pulping is recovered lumber from demolition, industrial processing of wood and wooden pallets.

Salvage cutting is the removal of trees that have been killed or damaged by insects, disease, wind, ice, snow, volcanic activity, or wildfire. The purpose of salvage cutting is to recover the economic value of trees before they decay. Dead trees decay quickly, and the timing of salvage cutting is crucial to capture as much economic value as possible. Post-fire salvage cutting helps manage fuels and future fire behaviour, as long as logging slash is treated after the harvest.

=== Wood residuals ===
Saw residuals are used as pulpwood. The most important of these are the side cuttings from lumber edger. This gives wood with almost only sapwood and no heartwood. The sapwood is easier to pulp. due to a more open structure and less content of extractive than the heartwood. The fibre length of sapwood is generally longer than the fibre length of heartwood. The sapwood is also normally lighter and that is an advantage when producing mechanical pulp as less bleaching of wood pulp is needed.

Sawdust gives very short fibres that are suitable as part of the furnish for paper tissue and writing papers. Saw blades have become thinner and with smaller teeth making the sawdust too small as fibre source.

=== Chemical composition of some pulpwoods ===
Chemical composition of pulpwood (%)
Wood	Cellulose	Lignin	Mannan	Araban	Xylan
Aspen	56.5	16.3	2.3	0.4	16.0
Paper Birch	44.5	18.9	1.5	0.5	24.6
Red maple	44.8	24	3.5	0.5	17.3
Balsam fir	47.7	29.4	12.4	0.5	4.8
Jack pine	45.0	28.6	10.8	1.4	7.1
White spruce	48.5	27.1	11.6	1.6	6.8

== Alternative uses ==
Sugar cane byproducts and bamboo are used in the commercial production of toilet paper.

Wood pulp has many modern-day uses other than paper-making and the other applications mentioned in the "Softwood Applications," and "Hardwood Applications" sections. Their uses can range from hygiene products to innovative medical products.

Wood can also be used as raw material for new bio-products, such as environmentally friendly textile manufacturing technologies. There are a few ways pulpwood is being used to develop technologies that consume less energy and fewer chemicals.

1. Pulp can be processed mechanically to produce tiny micro-fibrillated cellulose, which can be used to make fibres without any solvents.
2. Pulp is dissolved in an ionic fluid, then pressed to form thin strands that can be used to make yarn.
3. Fibres are first separated, then the material becomes a liquid and converted into textile fibres.

== See also ==
- Paper pulp
- Pulp mill
- Paper machine
- Woodchips
