= GTFC =

GTFC may refer to:

- Gainsborough Trinity F.C.
- Garforth Town F.C.
- Gedling Town F.C.
- Gillingham Town F.C. (Dorset)
- Gillingham Town F.C. (Kent)
- Glastonbury Town F.C.
- Godalming Town F.C.
- Grantham Town F.C.
- Grimsby Town F.C.
- Guisborough Town F.C.
- Guna Trading F.C.
- Sucrose—1,6-alpha-glucan 3(6)-alpha-glucosyltransferase, an enzyme
