= Hydroxypropanal =

Hydroxypropanal may refer to:

- Lactaldehyde (2-hydroxypropanal)
- Reuterin (3-hydroxypropanal)
