= Reutericyclin =

Names
- IUPAC name (2R)-4-Acetyl-1-[(E)-dec-2-enoyl]-3-hydroxy-2-(2-methylpropyl)-2H-pyrrol-5-one

Identifiers
CAS Number	303957-69-9
3D model (JSmol)	Interactive image
ChemSpider	111251545
PubChem CID	54696024
UNII	4XSP5EH6PD
- InChI: InChI=1S/C20H31NO4/c1-5-6-7-8-9-10-11-12-17(23)21-16(13-14(2)3)19(24)18(15(4)22)20(21)25/h11-12,14,16,24H,5-10,13H2,1-4H3/b12-11+ Key: GNGSBVNLHSNSDF-VAWYXSNFSA-N
- SMILES: C(/C=C/CCCCCCC)(=O)N1[C@H](CC(C)C)C(=O)C(C(C)=O)=C1O
- Except where otherwise noted, data are given for materials in their standard state (at 25 °C [77 °F], 100 kPa). Infobox references

Reutericyclin is a tetramic acid antibiotic produced by the bacterium Limosilactobacillus reuteri (formerly Lactobacillus reuteri) that has potential use as a food preservative. Reutericyclin is a hydrophobic, negatively charged molecule with the molecular formula C_{20}H_{31}NO_{4}.

Reutericyclin disrupts the cell membrane of sensitive bacteria by acting as a proton ionophore. Reutericyclin has a broad spectrum of activity against Gram-positive bacteria, but has no effect on Gram-negative bacteria because the lipopolysaccharide (LPS) in the outer membrane of Gram-negative bacteria prevents access by hydrophobic compounds.

== Biosynthesis ==
Reutericyclin is synthesized by some strains of L. reuteri by a 9-gene cluster, containing a polyketide synthase (PKSs) and a non-ribosomal peptide synthetase (NRPS).
