= Limosilactobacillus =

Scientific classification
- Domain: Bacteria
- Kingdom: Bacillati
- Phylum: Bacillota
- Class: Bacilli
- Order: Lactobacillales
- Family: Lactobacillaceae
- Genus: Limosilactobacillus; Zheng et al. 2020

Type species
- Limosilactobacillus fermentum (Beijerinck 1901) Zheng et al. 2020

Species
- See text.

Genus of bacteria

Limosilactobacillus is a thermophilic and heterofermentative genus of lactic acid bacteria created in 2020 by splitting from Lactobacillus. The name is derived from the Latin limosus "slimy", referring to the property of most strains in the genus to produce exopolysaccharides from sucrose. The genus currently includes 31 species or subspecies, most of these were isolated from the intestinal tract of humans or animals. Limosilactobacillus reuteri has been used as a model organism to evaluate the host-adaptation of lactobacilli to the human and animal intestine and for the recruitment of intestinal lactobacilli for food fermentations. Limosilactobacillus fermentum is an exception as this species is not considered host adapted but nomadic Lm. reuteri, Limosilactobacillus pontis and other limosilactobacilli occur frequently in back-slopped cereal fermentations while Lm. fermentum reliably occurs in spontaneous cereal fermentations. Lm. reuteri and Lm. fermentum also have been successfully applied as probiotics

Limosilactobacilli are heterofermentative and produce lactate, CO_{2}, and acetate or ethanol from glucose; several limosilactobacilli, particularly strains of Lm. reuteri convert glycerol or 1,2-propanediol to 1,3 propanediol or propanol, respectively. Most strains do not grow in presence of oxygen, or in de Man, Rogosa Sharpe (MRS) medium, the standard medium for cultivation of lactobacilli. Addition of maltose, cysteine and fructose to MRS is usually sufficient for cultivation of limosilactobacilli although some species, e.g. Limosilactobacillus secaliphilus, require special cultivation media.

== Species ==
The genus Limosilactobacillus comprises the following species:

- Limosilactobacillus agrestis Li et al. 2021
- Limosilactobacillus albertensis Li et al. 2021
- Limosilactobacillus alvi Zheng et al. 2020
- Limosilactobacillus antri (Roos et al. 2005) Zheng et al. 2020
- Limosilactobacillus balticus Li et al. 2021
- Limosilactobacillus caviae (Killer et al. 2017) Zheng et al. 2020
- Limosilactobacillus coleohominis (Nikolaitchouk et al. 2001) Zheng et al. 2020
- Limosilactobacillus equigenerosi (Endo et al. 2008) Zheng et al. 2020
- Limosilactobacillus fastidiosus Li et al. 2021
- Limosilactobacillus fermentum (Beijerinck 1901) Zheng et al. 2020
- Limosilactobacillus frumenti (Müller et al. 2000) Zheng et al. 2020
- Limosilactobacillus gastricus (Roos et al. 2005) Zheng et al. 2020
- Limosilactobacillus gorillae (Tsuchida et al. 2014) Zheng et al. 2020
- Limosilactobacillus ingluviei (Baele et al. 2003) Zheng et al. 2020
- Limosilactobacillus mucosae (Roos et al. 2000) Zheng et al. 2020
- Limosilactobacillus oris (Farrow and Collins 1988) Zheng et al. 2020
- Limosilactobacillus panis (Wiese et al. 1996) Zheng et al. 2020
- Limosilactobacillus pontis (Vogel et al. 1994) Zheng et al. 2020
- Limosilactobacillus portuensis Ksiezarek et al. 2021
- Limosilactobacillus reuteri (Kandler et al. 1982) Zheng et al. 2020
- Limosilactobacillus rudii Li et al. 2021
- Limosilactobacillus secaliphilus (Ehrmann et al. 2007) Zheng et al. 2020
- Limosilactobacillus urinaemulieris Ksiezarek et al. 2021
- Limosilactobacillus vaginalis (Embley et al. 1989) Zheng et al. 2020

The following species are effectively but not validly described:

Limosilactobacillus walteri (Sahora et al. 2023) Limosilactobacillus allomucosae (Chen et al.. 2024)

== Phylogeny ==
The currently accepted taxonomy is based on the List of Prokaryotic names with Standing in Nomenclature and the phylogeny is based on whole-genome sequences.

- - Limosilactobacillus
    - - - - - - - Limosilactobacillus antri
                - Limosilactobacillus oris
              - Limosilactobacillus panis
            - - Limosilactobacillus frumenti
              - Limosilactobacillus vaginalis
          - Limosilactobacillus pontis
        - - Limosilactobacillus caviae
          - Limosilactobacillus reuteri
      - - - Limosilactobacillus ingluviei
          - Limosilactobacillus alvi
        - - Limosilactobacillus coleohominis
          - Limosilactobacillus secaliphilus
    - - Limosilactobacillus mucosae
      - - - Limosilactobacillus equigenerosi
          - Limosilactobacillus gastricus
        - - Limosilactobacillus gorillae
          - Limosilactobacillus fermentum
  - outgroup
    Holzapfelia
