= Reuteran =

Reuteran, which is synthesized by reuteransucrase, is a complex α-glucan that is differentiated in part by the large amount of α(1-4) and α(1-6) linkages. The polysaccharide is made of repeating monosaccharide units of D-glucose. The glucose units are connected via alpha glyosidic bonds between the first carbon on one glucose to the fourth carbon on the next glucose molecule. Additional branching αlpha linkages occur between the sixth carbon of a glucose molecule and then the first carbon of the subsequent glucose molecule. These branches occur approximately every 5-7 glucose units.

== Synthesis ==
Reuteran is synthesized by an extracellular enzyme called reuteransucrase often found in Lactobacillus reuteri which is part of the lactic acid bacteria family. Bacterial cells secrete reuteransucrase into the environment around them which then binds to sucrose and hydrolyze it into glucose and fructose. The glucose monomers are polymerized together in α(1-4) and α(1-6) glycosidic bonds. The fructose can be used for other metabolic purposes within the cell, or converted to glucose. Around 70% of the bonds formed are 1-4 linkages.

== Applications ==
Reuteran has a low digestibility in the human digestive tract which causes it to act similar to an insoluble fiber in the human digestive tract. Similar to other exopolysaccharides produced by lactic acid bacteria it can be used in the food industry. It can be used as a thickening agent, or to add texture to food products.
