= Alternan =

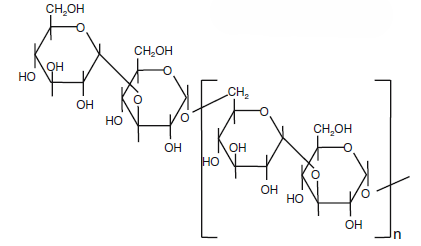

Identifiers
CAS Number	136510-13-9

Properties
Chemical formula	(C_{6}H_{10}O_{5})_{n}
Solubility in water	Highly soluble
- Except where otherwise noted, data are given for materials in their standard state (at 25 °C [77 °F], 100 kPa). Infobox references

Alternan is a branched α-d-glucan produced by microorganisms. This polymer was first discovered in the bacterium Leuconostoc mesenteroides, which has since been genetically engineered to produce alternan. They genetically engineered the genes for alternansucrase, the enzyme that produces alternan, to get a pure sample. This gene of the enzyme alternansucrase had also been genetically engineered into E. coli.

This compound is highly soluble in water and has a low viscosity. These characteristics make it a prime candidate to use in the food and cosmetic industries.

== Biosynthesis ==
Alternan is an exopolysaccharide generated from the glucose monosaccharides of sucrose by the enzyme alternansucrase. The polysaccharide is assembled with α-(1→6) and α-(1→3) glycosidic bonds. Alternansucrase was initially found in Leuconostoc mesenteroides, a bacterial species used in the dairy industry. L. mesenteroides is a gram positive bacterium that performs fermentation. During fermentation the bacterium produces a very high amount of alternan and dextran, requiring a medium containing sucrose, nitrogen, glutamate, thiamine, and valine. The alternan is then extracted from the fermentation product through centrifugation or filtration.

== Industrial use ==
Alternan has numerous industrial uses. One of the valuable uses is in food production as an essential component of the sweetener sucromalt, also known as Xtend, which is commonly used in diabetic foods due to its low glycemic index. Alternan can also be used to add texture to food or cosmetics in place of fat or oil.

Alternan has shown potential as a bulking agent as it has a low viscosity and high solubility. These properties are shared with other commonly used food extenders and binders. Few microorganisms have the ability to break down alternan, it is also able to retain its structure and properties when exposed to heat, making it a strong candidate to improve shelf-life of food products.

== Future Applications ==
Alternan has shown promising applications in stem cell research. When treating mesenchymal stem cells (MSC) with alternan they showed increased proliferation and viability. Alternan stimulated toll-like receptors in the MSC that are important in differentiation of the cell as well as increased migration abilities of the MSC. Alternan could be a beneficial additive to stem cell therapies to improve outcomes.
