= Alain de Weck =

Swiss immunologist and allergist (1928–2013)

Alain Ladislas de Weck
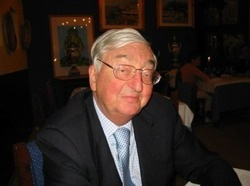
- Born: July 26, 1928; Les Avants, near Montreux
- Died: April 8, 2013 (aged 84); Fribourg in Switzerland
- Known for: drug allergy, in-vitro immunological testing, cheese washer's disease
- Awards: Robert Koch Prize (1972), Clemens von Pirquet Medal (1990), Member Académie Nationale de Médecine
- Scientific career
- Fields: Clinical Immunology, Allergy
- Institutions: University of Bern, University of Navarra, NIH

Alain L. de Weck (July 26, 1928 – April 8, 2013) was a Swiss immunologist and allergist. His main scientific contributions were in the area of characterization and prevention of drug allergy. He was the founding director of the Institute of Clinical Immunology at the University of Bern from 1971 to 1993 and authored or co-authored over 600 peer-reviewed publications. He is the recipient of a number of patents that led to commercial allergy products and services. He served as president of international scientific organizations such as the International Union of Immunological Societies (IUIS) and the International Association for Allergy and Clinical Immunology (IAACI) (now the World Allergy Organization) and was founder and later CEO of the Centre Médical des Grand-Places (CMG) company, acquired by Heska of Fort Collins (Nasdaq: HSKA) in 1997. In later years he continued his research at the University of Navarra in Spain and wrote on a wide range of topics such as the distinction between science and pseudo-science, the emergence of genetically modified organisms (GMOs) and comparative health care policy.

== Education ==
Alain de Weck grew up in Crans-Montana, attended the Collège Calvin in Geneva and later completed his Baccalauréat in classical studies at the Collège Saint-Michel in Fribourg in 1947. He obtained his M.D. degree from the University of Geneva in November 1953 after medical studies in Fribourg, Lausanne and Geneva. He did his residency in Paris at various hospitals including the Hôpital Bichat, and the Pitié-Salpêtrière Hospital. During this time he was an early resident at the Pavillon Suisse designed by the architect Le Corbusier at the Cité Internationale Universitaire de Paris. Starting in 1954, he came under the tutelage of Professor Werner Jadassohn, then the head of the Department of Dermatology in Geneva, the son of dermatologist, Joseph Jadassohn. There he started investigating the occurrence and root causes of inflammation as well as contact dermatitis due to lymphocytes using the guinea pig nipple as a model for the human skin. This led to the first histopathological demonstration that contact dermatitis is due to sensitized lymphocytes. He then stayed - as the first U.S. Public Health Service funded foreign research fellow from Switzerland - at Barnes Hospital at Washington University in St. Louis from 1958 to 1960 under the guidance of Prof. Herman Eisen. During this time, Alain de Weck made initial contributions to what later became one of his signature research areas: penicillin allergy. In particular he developed penicilloyl-polylysine (PPL) as a test reagent for detecting penicillin allergy.

== Scientific contributions ==
Starting in 1961, after his return to Switzerland, he established himself as an independent researcher and eventually full professor (Ordinarius) at the University of Bern with initial support from the Swiss National Science Foundation. From 1961 to 1971 he ran a successful clinical immunology and allergy program under Prof. Hans Kuske in the Department of Dermatology at the Inselspital Bern, the university hospital. During this time he investigated a growing variety of topics such as hapten-antibody interactions, contact dermatitis, immunological tolerance to simple chemicals, delayed (type IV) hypersensitivity and lymphocyte proliferation, among others. On October 1, 1971, he became the founding chairman of the Institute of Clinical Immunology and Allergy at the University of Bern, a position he held until his retirement in 1993. One of the noteworthy contributions was the first description of the now well-known Cheese Washer's Disease (in German: "Kaesewascherkrankheit"), a special form of farmer's lung syndrome.

Prof. Alain de Weck was a specialist at translating immunological theory into new medical applications for both diagnosis and treatment. His main contributions range from the characterization of the molecular causes of penicillin allergy, the suppression of allergic reactions using hapten inhibition, the international standardization of allergens to the study of Immunoglobulin E (IgE) synthesis and associated receptors, and the development of new diagnostics techniques such as in-vitro cellular assays as well as flow cytometric tests. He elucidated the mechanism of action of lactobacillus vaccines used in recurrent nonspecific gynaecological infections.

Clinical activities included services such as allergy diagnostics using allergen-specific IgE antibodies (RAST test) and mediator analyses, leukocyte histocompatibility antigen (HLA group) typing for organ transplant (mainly kidney and liver), as well as cellular immunology testing particularly for the diagnosis of drug allergy and some autoimmune disorders such as HIV. The institute offered a full curriculum in immunology and allergy at the university and also collaborated on textbooks of this rapidly evolving field. The institute hosted a large number of foreign researchers and visitors starting in the 1970s.

== Entrepreneurship ==
In his entrepreneurial activities Alain de Weck focused initially on the immunological aspects of aging and was co-founder of an unsuccessful clinic called CLIMARLY (1978–1982). His second more successful venture resulted from research on cellular assays for low cost in-vitro allergy testing using the Immunodot technology for IgE-based detection of allergies and other diseases such as HIV using low-cost cellulose strips and optical density measurements. He subsequently founded the Centre Medical des Grand-Places (CMG) company with a number of investors, including the Japanese pharmaceutical firm Nippon Zoki. One of Alain de Weck's main collaborators during this time was Dr. Michael Derer. CMG successfully developed, manufactured and sold a series of diagnostic allergy screening tests under the name "TOP SCREEN" to test for the presence of specific IgEs to a variety of about 40 of the most common allergens. In 1994-1995 CMG added diagnostic tests for dog allergy and was subsequently acquired by Heska of Fort Collins, Colorado, in 1997.

== International scientific organizations and awards ==
Alain de Weck was well known for was his leadership in and of international scientific organizations. He served as president of IUIS, the International Union of Immunological Societies from 1983 to 1986 as well as the International Association of Allergology and Clinical Immunology (IAACI), now World Allergy Organization (WAO) from 1985 to 1988. Other societies like the Collegium Internationale Allergologicum (CIA), the European Academy of Allergy and Clinical Immunology (EAACI), the Swiss Society, the German Society and the World Health Organization (WHO) also benefitted from his leadership. One of his accomplishments in science diplomacy was to bring new countries and scientists into these organizations, including those from the former Soviet Union and Taiwan. One of the highlights of these activities was his chairmanship of the XIIIth IAACI Congress in Montreux in 1988 with 5,600 participants

Alain de Weck received several awards and recognitions for his scientific work including, among others:

- 1972 Robert Koch Prize in Life Sciences
- 1990 Clemens von Pirquet Medal
- Election as a foreign member of the Académie Nationale de Médecine

== Retirement ==
After his retirement from the University of Bern in 1993 Alain de Weck remained active as an Extraordinary Professor at the pontifical University of Navarra in Pamplona, Spain where he collaborated on further development and validation of flow cytometry for immunological testing, as well as a frequent columnist in newspapers voicing his opinion on a wide variety of topics such as the distinction between true science and pseudo-science, the immunological aspects of genetically modified organisms (GMOs) and the future of health care policy in different countries.
