= Reuterin =

Names
- Preferred IUPAC name 3-Hydroxypropanal

Identifiers
CAS Number	2134-29-4
3D model (JSmol)	Interactive image
ChEBI	CHEBI:17871
ChemSpider	67601
ECHA InfoCard	100.016.696
KEGG	C00969
PubChem CID	75049
UNII	I0NJE782CV
CompTox Dashboard (EPA)	DTXSID4062199
- InChI: InChI=1S/C3H6O2/c4-2-1-3-5/h2,5H,1,3H2 Key: AKXKFZDCRYJKTF-UHFFFAOYSA-N; InChI=1/C3H6O2/c4-2-1-3-5/h2,5H,1,3H2 Key: AKXKFZDCRYJKTF-UHFFFAOYAX
- SMILES: C(CO)C=O

Properties
Chemical formula	C_{3}H_{6}O_{2}
Molar mass	74.079 g·mol^{−1}
- Except where otherwise noted, data are given for materials in their standard state (at 25 °C [77 °F], 100 kPa). Infobox references

Reuterin (3-hydroxypropionaldehyde) is the organic compound with the formula HOCH_{2}CH_{2}CHO. It is a bifunctional molecule, containing both a hydroxy and aldehyde functional groups.

The name reuterin is derived from Limosilactobacillus reuteri, which produces the compound biosynthetically from glycerol as a broad-spectrum antibiotic (bacteriocin). L. reuteri itself is named after the microbiologist Gerhard Reuter, who did early work in distinguishing it as a distinct species.

== Solution structure ==
In aqueous solution 3-hydroxypropionaldehyde exists in equilibrium with its hydrate (1,1,3-propanetriol), in which the aldehyde group converts to a geminal diol:

HOCH_{2}CH_{2}CHO + H_{2}O → HOCH_{2}CH_{2}CH(OH)_{2}

The hydrate is also in equilibrium with its dimer (2-(2-hydroxyethyl)-4-hydroxy-1,3-dioxane), which dominates at high concentrations. These three components - the aldehyde, its dimer, and the hydrate are therefore in a dynamic equilibrium.

Besides, 3-hydroxypropionaldehyde suffers a spontaneous dehydration in aqueous solution, and the resulting molecule is called acrolein.

In fact, the term reuterin is the name given to the dynamic system formed by 3-hydroxypropionaldehyde, its hydrate, the dimer, and acrolein. This last molecule, acrolein, was recently included in reuterin definition.

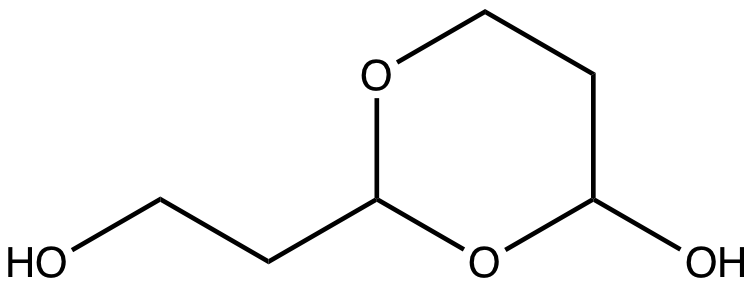
Structure of the dimer of 3-hydroxypropionaldehyde

== Synthesis and reactions ==
3-Hydroxypropionaldehyde is formed by the condensation of acetaldehyde and formaldehyde. This reaction, when conducted in the gas-phase, was the basis for a now obsolete industrial route acrolein:

CH_{3}CHO + CH_{2}O → HOCH_{2}CH_{2}CHO
HOCH_{2}CH_{2}CHO → CH_{2}=CHCHO + H_{2}O

Presently 3-hydroxypropionaldehyde is an intermediate in the production of pentaerythritol. Hydrogenation of reuterin gives 1,3-propanediol.

== Biological activity ==
Reuterin is an intermediate in the metabolism of glycerol to 1,3-propanediol catalysed by the coenzyme B12-dependent glycerol dehydratase.

Reuterin is a potent antimicrobial compound produced by Lactobacillus reuteri. It inhibits the growth of some harmful Gram-negative and Gram-positive bacteria, along with yeasts, molds, and protozoa. L. reuteri can secrete sufficient amounts of reuterin to inhibit the growth of harmful gut organisms, without killing beneficial gut bacteria, allowing L. reuteri to remove gut invaders while keeping normal gut flora intact.

Reuterin is water-soluble, effective in a wide range of pH, resistant to proteolytic and lipolytic enzymes, and has been studied as a food preservative or auxiliary therapeutic agent.

Reuterin as an extracted compound has been shown capable of killing Escherichia coli O157:H7 and Listeria monocytogenes, with the addition of lactic acid increasing its efficacy. It has also been demonstrated to kill Escherichia coli O157:H7 when produced by L. reuteri.
