= Glucansucrase =

Enzyme

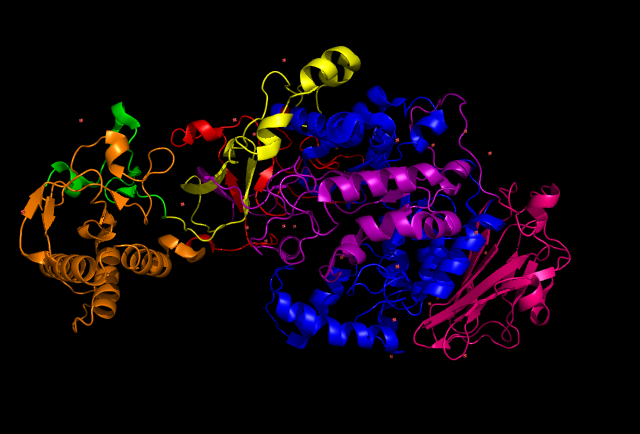
Glucansucrase in Streptococcus mutans. The domains are color coded. For domains made up of discontiguous segments, each segment was assigned a number. Shown here are segments IV1 (orange), B1 (red), A1 (blue), C (pink), A2 (purple), B2 (yellow), and IV2 (green).

Glucansucrase (also known as glucosyltransferase) is an enzyme in the glycoside hydrolase family GH70 used by lactic acid bacteria to split sucrose; it then utilizes the resulting glucose molecules to build long, sticky biofilm chains. These extracellular homopolysaccharides are called α-glucan polymers.

Glucansucrase enzymes can synthesize a variety of glucans with differing solubilities, rheology, and other properties by altering the type of glycosidic linkage, degree of branching, length, mass, and conformation of the polymers. Glucansucrases are classified according to the glycosidic linkage they catalyze. They can be mutansucrases, dextransucrases, alternansucrases, or reuteransucrases. This versatility has made glucansucrase useful for industrial applications. Glucansucrase's role in cariogenesis is a major point of interest. Glucan polymers stick to teeth in the human mouth and cause tooth decay.

== Structure ==
Glucansucrases are large, extracellular proteins with average molecular masses around 160,000 daltons. Therefore crystallography studies have only been carried out for fragments of the enzymes, not complete structures. However, glucansucrase is very similar to α-amylase, another sugar-cutting enzyme. Glucansucrase thus has many of the same structural features. For example, both enzymes have three domains in their catalytic core and a (β/α)_{8} barrel.

Glucansucrase has five major domains: A, B, C, IV, and V. The domains in glucansucrase, however, have a different arrangement than those in α-amylase. The folding characteristics of α-amylase and glucansucrase are still very similar, but their domains are permuted. Domains A, B, IV, and V are built from two discontiguous parts of the polypeptide chain, causing the chain to follow a U-shape. From the N- to C-terminus, the polypeptide chain goes in the following order: V, IV, B, A, C, A, B, IV, V (see figure at top right). The C domain is the only one made up of a continuous polypeptide sequence.

Domain A contains the (β/α)_{8} barrel and the catalytic site. In the catalytic site, three residues in particular play important roles for enzymatic activity: a nucleophilic aspartate, an acid/base glutamate, and an additional aspartate to stabilize the transition state.

Domain B makes up a twisted antiparallel β sheet. Some of the loops in domain B help shape the groove near the catalytic site. Additionally, some amino acids between domains A and B form a calcium binding site near the nucleophilic aspartate. The Ca^{2+} ion is necessary for enzyme activity.

== Reaction and Mechanism ==
Glucansucrase has two parts to its reaction. First it cleaves a glycosidic bond to split sucrose. Products of the reaction are the constituent monosaccharides glucose and fructose. This glucose is added to a growing glucan chain. Glucansucrase uses the energy released from bond cleavage to drive glucan synthesis. Both sucrose breakdown and glucan synthesis occur in the same active site.

The first step is carried out through a transglycosylation mechanism involving a glycosyl-enzyme intermediate in subsite-1. Glutamate is likely the catalytic acid/base, aspartate the nucleophile, and another aspartate the transition state stabilizer. These three residues are all highly conserved and mutating them leads to a significant decrease in enzymatic activity.

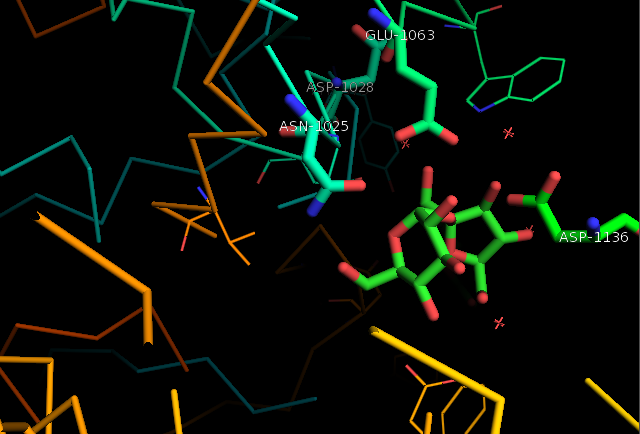
Active site of glucansucrase in Lactobacillus reuteri

The glucansucrase mechanism has historically been controversial in the scientific literature. The mechanism involves two displacements. The first originates from a glycosidic cleavage of the sucrose substrate between subsites -1 and +1. This releases fructose and forms a sugar-enzyme intermediate when the glucose unit attaches to the nucleophile.

The second displacement is transfer of a glucosyl moiety to an acceptor, such as a growing glucan chain. The debate in the past was over whether the glucosyl group attached to the non-reducing or reducing end of an incoming acceptor. Additional investigations pointed to a non-reducing mechanism with a single active site.

== Evolution ==
Glucansucrase proteins likely evolved from an amylase enzyme precursor. The two enzymes have similar folding patterns and protein domains. In fact, past attempts to produce drugs targeting glucansucrase have not been successful because the drugs also disrupted amylase, which is necessary to break down starches. This occurred because the active sites of the two enzymes are nearly the same. Glucansucrase likely maintained a highly-conserved active site as it underwent a different evolutionary path.

== Health ==
Glucansucrase allows the oral bacteria Streptococcus mutans to metabolize sucrose into lactic acid. This lactic acid lowers the pH around teeth and dissolves calcium phosphate in tooth enamel, leading to tooth decay. Additionally, the synthesis of glucan aids S. mutans in adhering to the surface of teeth. As the polymers accumulate, they help more acid-producing bacteria stay on teeth. Consequently, glucansucrase is such an attractive drug target to prevent tooth decay. If S. mutans can no longer break down sucrose and synthesize glucan, calcium phosphate is not degraded and bacteria cannot adhere as easily to teeth.

== Industry ==
Bacteria with glucansucrase enzymes are used extensively in industry for a variety of applications. The polymer dextran is one prominent example of a very useful polymer. It is produced at commercial scale for uses in veterinary medicine, separation technology, biotechnology, the food industry for gelling, viscosifying, and emulsifying, in human medicine as a prebiotic, cholesterol-lowering agent or blood plasma expander, and more.

== See also ==
- Alternansucrase
