= Mutan =

Polysaccharide in dental biofilms

Mutan is a sticky colorless water-insoluble glucan with predominant α-1-3 linkages is the major component of dental biofilms, which enhances the formation of dental plaque and dental caries. It is a source made from glucans (D-glucose polysaccharides) which are derived form glucose monomers. Little to nothing is known about the alpha glucans that make up the water-insoluble linkages of mutan with dexteran. These values can be derived using NMR techniques.

== Synthesis ==
Mutan is an extracellular polysaccharide characterized by glucose residues linked through α-1-3 connections. Its synthesis entails transferring monosaccharides from a disaccharide substrate to the elongating oligosaccharide chain's reducing end. Cariogenic and acidophilic oral microorganisms produce mutan via cell-bound or extracellular glucosyltransferases in the presence of dietary sucrose. Mutan structure varies with organism and enzyme type, affecting polymerization, branching, and the ratio of α-1−3 and α-1–6 linkages.

== Clinical significance ==
As the leading causative agent in oral biofilms, Streptococcus mutans forms an integral part of tooth plaque formation and is the bacteria responsible for degradation of tooth enamel. Glucan sucrase is an enzyme responsible for the synthesis of mutans from sucrose, which aids in attachment to hard surfaces such as the facial side of the tooth. While S. mutans is not solely responsible for the function of the biofilm, it creates an EPS (extracellular polysaccharide) environment that provides ideal conditions for countless other species, many of which are acidic and further degrade tooth enamel.
