= Dextransucrase =

Class of enzymes

dextransucrase

Identifiers
- EC no.: 2.4.1.5
- CAS no.: 9032-14-8

Databases
- IntEnz: IntEnz view
- BRENDA: BRENDA entry
- ExPASy: NiceZyme view
- KEGG: KEGG entry
- MetaCyc: metabolic pathway
- PRIAM: profile
- PDB structures: RCSB PDB PDBe PDBsum
- Gene Ontology: AmiGO / QuickGO
Search
- PMC: articles
- PubMed: articles
- NCBI: proteins

In enzymology, a dextransucrase (EC 2.4.1.5) is an enzyme that catalyzes the chemical reaction

sucrose + (1,6-alpha-D-glucosyl)_{n} $\rightleftharpoons$ D-fructose + (1,6-alpha-D-glucosyl)_{n+1}

Thus, the two substrates of this enzyme are sucrose and (1,6-alpha-D-glucosyl)_{n}, whereas its two products are D-fructose and (1,6-alpha-D-glucosyl)_{n+1}.

This enzyme belongs to the family of glycosyltransferases, specifically the hexosyltransferases. The systematic name of this enzyme class is sucrose:1,6-alpha-D-glucan 6-alpha-D-glucosyltransferase. Other names in common use include sucrose 6-glucosyltransferase, SGE, CEP, and sucrose-1,6-alpha-glucan glucosyltransferase. This enzyme participates in starch and sucrose metabolism and two-component system - general.
