= Alternansucrase =

Enzyme

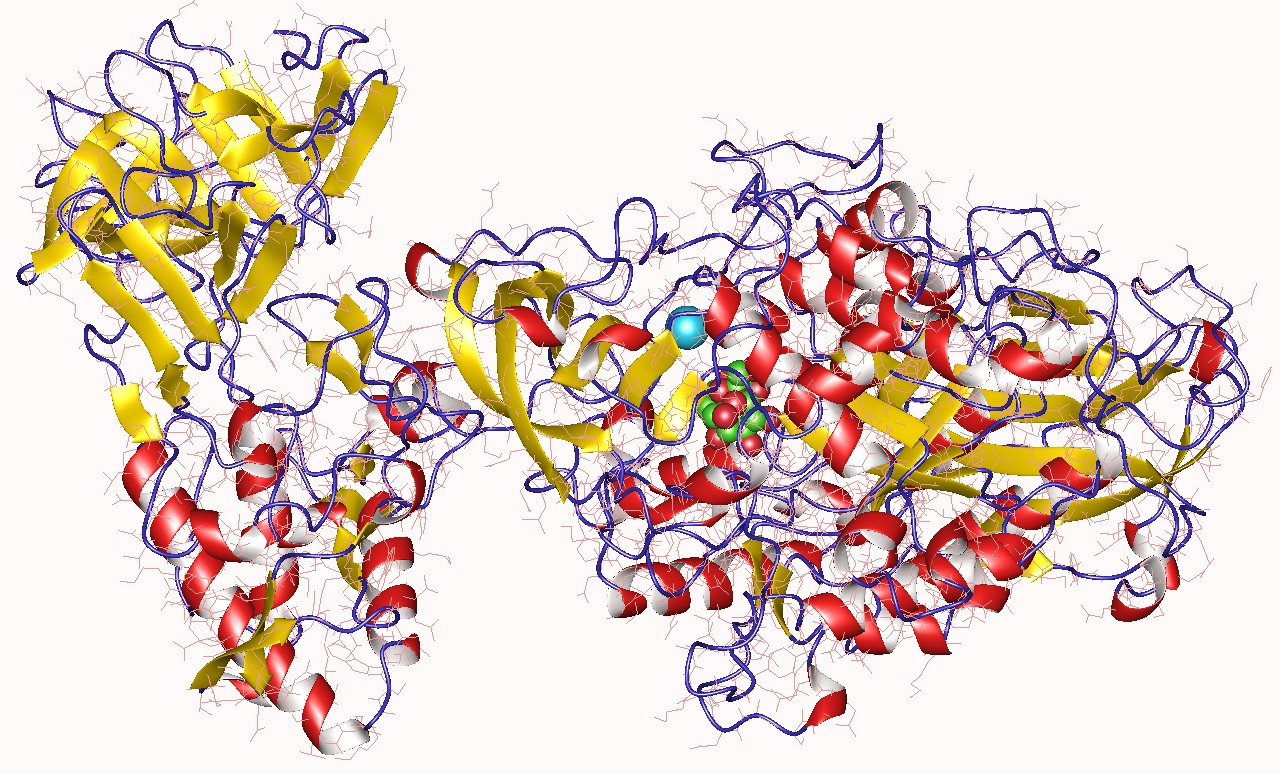
- Alternansucrase (dextransucrase) monomer, Leuconostoc citreum

Identifiers
- EC no.: 2.4.1.140
- CAS no.: 100630-46-4

Databases
- IntEnz: IntEnz view
- BRENDA: BRENDA entry
- ExPASy: NiceZyme view
- KEGG: KEGG entry
- MetaCyc: metabolic pathway
- PRIAM: profile
- PDB structures: RCSB PDB PDBe PDBsum
Search
- PMC: articles
- PubMed: articles
- NCBI: proteins

In enzymology, an alternansucrase (EC 2.4.1.140) is an enzyme that catalyzes a chemical reaction that transfers an alpha-D-glucosyl residue from sucrose alternately to the 6- and 3-positions of the non-reducing terminal residue of an alpha-D-glucan, thereby creating a glucan with alternating alpha-1,6- and alpha-1,3-bonds. The name "alternan" was coined in 1982 (Cote & Robyt) for the glucan based on its alternating linkage structure.

This enzyme belongs to the family of glycosyltransferases, specifically the hexosyltransferases. The systematic name of this enzyme class is sucrose:1,6(1,3)-alpha-D-glucan 6(3)-alpha-D-glucosyltransferase. Other names in common use include sucrose-1,6(3)-alpha-glucan 6(3)-alpha-glucosyltransferase, sucrose:1,6-, 1,3-alpha-D-glucan 3-alpha- and 6-alpha-D-glucosyltransferase.
