= Homopolysaccharide =

Polysaccharide made of a single type of sugar

Homopolysaccharides are polysaccharides composed of a single type of sugar monomer. For example, cellulose is an unbranched homopolysaccharide made up of glucose monomers connected via beta-glycosidic linkages; glycogen is a branched form, where the glucose monomers are joined by alpha-glycosidic linkages. Depending upon the molecules attached that are of the following types:

1. Glucan - A polysaccharide of glucose
2. Fructan - A polysaccharide of fructose
3. Galactan - A polysaccharide of galactose
4. Arabinan - A polysaccharide of arabinose
5. Xylan - A polysaccharide of xylose
