= Sucrose—1,6-alpha-glucan 3(6)-alpha-glucosyltransferase =

Class of enzymes

sucrose-1,6-alpha-glucan 3(6)-alpha-glucosyltransferase

Identifiers
- EC no.: 2.4.1.125
- CAS no.: 81725-87-3

Databases
- IntEnz: IntEnz view
- BRENDA: BRENDA entry
- ExPASy: NiceZyme view
- KEGG: KEGG entry
- MetaCyc: metabolic pathway
- PRIAM: profile
- PDB structures: RCSB PDB PDBe PDBsum
- Gene Ontology: AmiGO / QuickGO
Search
- PMC: articles
- PubMed: articles
- NCBI: proteins

In enzymology, a sucrose-1,6-alpha-glucan 3(6)-alpha-glucosyltransferase (EC 2.4.1.125) is an enzyme that catalyzes the chemical reaction

sucrose + (1,6-alpha-D-glucosyl)n $\rightleftharpoons$ D-fructose + (1,6-alpha-D-glucosyl)n^{+}1

Thus, the two substrates of this enzyme are sucrose and (1,6-alpha-D-glucosyl)n, whereas its two products are D-fructose and (1,6-alpha-D-glucosyl)n+1.

This enzyme belongs to the family of glycosyltransferases, specifically the hexosyltransferases. The systematic name of this enzyme class is sucrose:1,6-alpha-D-glucan 3(6)-alpha-D-glucosyltransferase. Other names in common use include water-soluble-glucan synthase, GTF-S, sucrose-1,6-alpha-glucan 3(6)-alpha-glucosyltransferase, sucrose:1,6-alpha-D-glucan 3-alpha- and 6-alpha-glucosyltransferase, sucrose:1,6-, 1,3-alpha-D-glucan 3-alpha- and, and 6-alpha-D-glucosyltransferase.
