= Limosilactobacillus fermentum =

Scientific classification
- Domain: Bacteria
- Kingdom: Bacillati
- Phylum: Bacillota
- Class: Bacilli
- Order: Lactobacillales
- Family: Lactobacillaceae
- Genus: Limosilactobacillus
- Species: L. fermentum

Binomial name
- Limosilactobacillus fermentum (Beijerinck 1901) Zheng et al. 2020

Synonyms
- Lactobacillus cellobiosus Rogosa et al. 1953 (Approved Lists 1980); Lactobacillus fermentum Beijerinck 1901 (Approved Lists 1980)

Species of bacterium

Limosilactobacillus fermentum is a Gram-positive species in the heterofermentative genus Limosilactobacillus. It is associated with active dental caries lesions. It is also commonly found in fermenting animal and plant material including sourdough and cocoa fermentation. Some strains of lactobacilli formerly mistakenly classified as L. fermentum (such as RC-14) have since been reclassified as Limosilactobacillus reuteri.

== Characteristics ==
Limosilactobacillus fermentum belongs to the genus Limosilactobacillus. Species in this genus are heterofermentative and adapted to the intestinal tract of vertebrates but also used for a wide variety of applications including food and feed fermentation. L. fermentum differs from most or all other species in the genus as it has a nomadic lifestyle and is not a stable member of human or animal intestinal microbiota. It has been found that some strains for L. fermentum have natural resistances to certain antibiotics and chemotherapeutics. They are considered potential vectors of antibiotic resistance genes from the environment to humans or animals to humans.

Some strains of L. fermentum have been associated with cholesterol metabolism.

== Probiotic ==
=== pH and bile tolerance ===
Testing of L. fermentum against different pH concentration solutions revealed that it has a strong pH tolerance by its ability to grow and survive a few hours after being incubated in a 3-pH level solution. Strains of L. fermentum have also been tested in different bile concentrations and demonstrated to have good bile tolerance when incubated with 3 g L-1 of bile salt. L. fermentum has been found to survive in these conditions further supporting the idea that it can act as a probiotic.

=== Limosilactobacillus fermentum ME-3 ===
The strain L. fermentum ME-3 has recently been discovered and identified as an antimicrobial and antioxidative probiotic. This strain of L. fermentum was discovered from the analysis of human fecal samples in 1994. One of the important characteristics of a probiotic microbe is the tolerance to conditions in the digestive tract. Tests conducted on the ME-3 strain in different bile concentrations found that it was able to survive without large loss in numbers. It has also been found that L. fermentum ME-3 has a tolerance to survive drops of pH levels. It can withstand a drop in values from 4.0 to 2.5 without decreasing in numbers. These characteristics of tolerance to bile concentrations and pH levels serve to classify ME-3 as a probiotic.

Limosilactobacillus fermentum ME-3 has also been found to have the capability to suppress mainly gram-negative bacteria. To a lesser extent, ME-3 has also been observed to be able to suppress enterococci and Staphylococcus aureus. This would serve a beneficial purpose to the host. ME-3 has several antimicrobial characteristics. These include acetic, lactic and succinic acids. Research on the antioxidant properties of strain ME-3 in soft cheese products revealed that it prevented spoilage. Experimentation has also been conducted on the consumption of the ME-3 strain. The consumption had a positive influence on the microbiota of the gut. Volunteers were given goat milk fermented by strain ME-3 and capsulated ME-3. After three weeks analysis of fecal samples revealed that the ME-3 strain increased the number of beneficial Lactobacilli in comparison to those who were given non-fermented milk. Several human clinical studies performed on ME-3 focused on parameters related to cardiovascular disease development. Consumption of ME-3 indeed results in a reduction of oxidized LDL cholesterol, which is a major contributor to atherosclerosis development. Several mechanisms may contribute to the antioxidant effect of ME-3: the strain modulates the ratio of reduced glutathione/oxidized glutathione in the blood, and increases the levels of paraoxonase, an antioxidant enzyme which protects LDL particles from oxidative modifications.

Properties of the strain ME-3 can serve to classify it as a probiotic that has the ability to protect its host against food-derived infections and also help in the prevention of oxidative damage of food. Its multi-abilities have been tested and proven. Mice treated with a combination of ofloxacin and ME-3 revealed a reduction in liver and spleen granulomas of Salmonella Typhimurium. ME-3 is commercialized in the US, in Europe and in Asia in dietary supplement products for cardiovascular health, immune support or detoxification, under the brandname Reg'Activ.

== Safety ==
In general, lactobacilli have been considered safe because of their association with food and because they are normal inhabitants of the human microbiota. They have also been identified to have a low pathogenic potential further reinforcing the idea that they are safe microbes.

Recent research in regards to the safety of L. fermentum has been carried out on mice. Mice were fed (intragastrically) different concentrations of L. fermentum while a control group was also observed. After twenty-eight days blood samples were taken from the mice and analyzed. There was no health difference observed between the control mice and those fed L.fermentum in terms of blood biochemistry, protein, albumin, glucose, and cholesterol. Also no negative side effects during the experiment such as change in body weight, feed intake, or clinical signs such as diarrhea and ruffled fur, were observed. The ingestion of L. fermentum in mice appeared safe which led to further support that the use of L. fermentum in food is also safe.

Limosilactobacillus fermentum has been identified in a rare case of cholecystitis but is included in the EFSA list of bacteria with qualified presumed safety (QPS).

=== Transferable resistance genes ===
One important consideration to determine the safety of L. fermentum is transferable resistant genes. In order for L. fermentum to be considered as a potential probiotic, it must not contain any transferable antibiotic resistance genes. If a resistance gene is transferable, it could lessen the effect of the use of antibiotics. Out of ten common antibiotic genes that were tested (gatamicin, cefazolin, penicillin, trimethoprim/sulfmethoxazole, ampicillin, carbenicillin, erythromycin, amikacin, chloramphenicol, and norfloxacin), L. fermentum was found to only be resistant to amikacin and norfloxacin. Others studies have reported that most LABs are also resistant to these antibiotics, which led to the conclusion that it was a common characteristic of LABs. The resistance to these antibiotics can be considered natural or intrinsic. So far no observed L. fermentum strains have been observed to have transferable resistance or acquired resistance genes.

=== Dairy products ===
Experiments conducted by introducing the strain ME-3 of L. fermentum into dairy products as a probiotic ingredient revealed that it was able to suppress the reputed contaminants of food such as pathogenic Salmonella spp., Shigella spp., and urinary tract infections that are caused by E. coli and Staphylococcus spp. Also the introduction of L. fermentum strains such as ME-3 in goat milk revealed that it was actually favorable to the host, resulting in an increase in number of beneficial lactobacilli.

== Heat resistance ==
Although LABs have been associated with potential health advantages, they are also responsible for negative outcomes. They are the main organisms involved in the spoilage of tomato products. Lactobacilli have been identified to be the causative organisms. Research was carried out to observe the chemical constituents of tomato juice that stimulate the growth of bacteria that are responsible for the spoilage. These bacteria can resist high temperatures. A strain of L. fermentum was extracted from a tomato juice concentrate. Meanwhile, eight different tomato juice mixtures were heated and the survival rate of L. fermentum was measured. It was concluded that pectins are the main tomato juice constituents that protect the bacteria cells against destruction from heating. The breakdown of pectin from enzymic action would make the bacteria cells more susceptible to heat. However, it was found in previous research that heating had inactivated natural pectolytic enzymes and therefore L. fermentum remained heat resistant. Heat resistance has also been found to correlate with the medium in which the bacteria are cultured, the better the medium used will result in a higher resistance to heat.

== Antibiotic resistance ==
Studies have shown that L. fermentum has antibiotic resistances. L. fermentum is inherently vancomycin resistant, as are all other Lactobacillaceae with exception of species in the genera Lactobacillus, Holzapfelia and Amylolactobacillus. DNA was isolated from L. fermentum and tested for antibiotic resistance against clinically important agents by using broth dilution tests. Different strains of L. fermentum demonstrated uniform resistance patterns demonstrating resistance to glycopeptide and to tetracycline.

=== Drug resistance plasmids ===
Research done on L. fermentum strains has revealed the existence of tetracycline and erythromycin resistance plasmids.

== Sensitivity to antibiotics ==
While L. fermentum has been found to have antibiotic resistant properties, other studies have demonstrated that strains of the species are sensitive to some common antibiotics such as gentamicin, cefazolin, penicillin, trimethoprim/sulfamethoxazole, ampicillin, carbenicillin, erythromycin, amikacin, and choloramphenicol.

== See also ==
- Lactic acid bacteria
- Lactobacillus
- Probiotic
