= Limosilactobacillus reuteri =

Scientific classification
- Domain: Bacteria
- Kingdom: Bacillati
- Phylum: Bacillota
- Class: Bacilli
- Order: Lactobacillales
- Family: Lactobacillaceae
- Genus: Limosilactobacillus
- Species: L. reuteri

Binomial name
- Limosilactobacillus reuteri Zheng et al., 2020

Synonyms
- Lactobacillus reuteri Kandler et al., 1980; Lactobacillus fermentum biotype II Reuter, 1965

Species of bacterium

Limosilactobacillus reuteri is a lactic acid bacterium. It is a member of the Lactobacillaceae family. It inhabits a variety of natural environments, including the gastrointestinal tract of humans and other animals. It does not appear to be pathogenic and may have health effects.

== Discovery ==
At the turn of the 20th century, L. reuteri was recorded in scientific classifications of lactic acid bacteria, though at this time it was mistakenly grouped as a member of Lactobacillus fermentum. In the 1960s, further work by microbiologist Gerhard Reuter, for whom the species eventually was named, reclassified the species as L. fermentum biotype II.

Significant differences were found between biotype II and other biotypes of L. fermentum, to the point that in 1980 it was identified as a distinct species and the formal species identity, L. reuteri, was proposed. In April 2020, L. reuteri was reassigned to the genus Limosilactobacillus.

== Prevalence ==
L. reuteri inhabits multiple natural environments. It has been isolated from many foods, especially meats and dairy products. It appears to be ubiquitous in the animal kingdom, including in the gastrointestinal tracts and feces of healthy humans, sheep, chickens, pigs, and rodents. It is the only species to constitute a "major component" of the Lactobacillus genus present in the gut of each of the tested host animals, and each host seems to harbor its own specific strain. It is possible that L. reuteri contributes to the health of its host organism.

L. reuteri is present as a dominant member of fermenting organisms in type II sourdoughs; several metabolic traits of L. reuteri, including exopolysaccharide formation and conversion of glutamine to glutamate, improve bread quality.

== Effects ==
=== Antimicrobial ===
Limosilactobacillus reuteri produces reuterin, reutericin 6 and reutericyclin.

==== Reuterin ====
In the late 1980s, Walter Dobrogosz, Ivan Casas and colleagues discovered that L. reuteri produced a novel broad-spectrum antibiotic substance via the organism's fermentation of glycerol. They named this substance reuterin, after Reuter. Reuterin is a multiple-compound dynamic equilibrium (HPA system, HPA) consisting of 3-hydroxypropionaldehyde, its hydrate, and its dimer. At concentrations above 1.4 M, the HPA dimer was predominant. However, at concentrations relevant for biological systems, HPA hydrate was the most abundant, followed by the aldehyde form.

Reuterin inhibits the growth of some harmful Gram-negative and Gram-positive bacteria, along with yeasts, fungi and protozoa. Researchers reported that L. reuteri can secrete sufficient amounts of reuterin to achieve desirable antimicrobial effects. Furthermore, since about four to five times the amount of reuterin is needed to kill "good" gut bacteria (i.e. L. reuteri and other Lactobacillus species) as "bad", L. reuteri can potentially remove gut invaders without harming other gut microbiota.

Some studies questioned whether reuterin production is essential for L. reuteri's health-promoting activity. In 2008, L. reuteri was confirmed to be capable of producing reuterin in the gastrointestinal tract, improving its ability to inhibit the growth of E. coli.

The gene cluster controlling the biosynthesis of reuterin and cobalamin in the L. reuteri genome is a genomic island acquired from an anomalous source.

=== Clinical results in humans ===
Although L. reuteri occurs naturally in humans, it is not found in all individuals. Dietary supplementation can sustain high levels of it in those with deficiencies. Oral intake of L. reuteri has been shown to effectively colonize the intestines of healthy individuals. Colonization begins within days of ingestion, although levels drop after months if intake is stopped. L. reuteri is found in breast milk. Oral intake on the mother's part increases the amount of L. reuteri present in her milk, and the likelihood that it will be transferred to her child.

==== Safety ====
Manipulation of gut microbiota is a complex process that may cause bacteria-host interactions. Although probiotics in general are considered safe, concerns exist about their use in certain cases. Some people, such as those with compromised immune systems, short bowel syndrome, central venous catheters, heart valve disease, and premature infants, may be at higher risk for adverse events. Rarely, consumption of probiotics may cause bacteremia, fungemia and sepsis, potentially fatal infections, in children with compromised immune systems or who are already critically ill.

==== Intestinal health ====
One of the better documented effects of L. reuteri is a significant reduction of symptom duration in pediatric diarrheal disease. L. reuteri is effective as a prophylactic for this illness; children fed it while healthy are less likely to experience diarrhea. With regard to prevention of gut infections, comparative research reported L. reuteri to be more potent than other probiotics. Animal research reported it to reduce motor complexes and thus intestinal motility.

L. reuteri may be effective treating necrotizing enterocolitis in preterm infants. Meta-analysis of randomized studies suggests that L. reuteri can reduce the incidence of sepsis and shorten the required duration of hospital treatment in this population.

L. reuteri is an effective treatment against infant colic. Studies suggest that colicky infants treated with L. reuteri experience a reduction in time spent crying compared to those treated with simethicone or placebo. However, colic is still poorly understood, and it is not clear why or how L. reuteri ameliorates its symptoms. One theory holds that affected infants cry because of gastrointestinal discomfort; if this is the case, it is plausible that L. reuteri somehow acts to lessen this discomfort, since its primary residence is inside the gut.

==== Gastric health ====
L. reuteri may be an effective treatment for H. pylori infection and may lead to an improvement of H. pylori-associated gastrointestinal symptoms such as peptic ulcers, reducing specific symptoms such as diarrhea and frequent abdominal distention. L. reuteri may cause fewer side effects than antibiotics. A 2005 study reported the addition of L. reuteri to omeprazole therapy dramatically increased (from 0% to 60%) the cure rate of H. pylori-infected patients compared to the drug alone. A 2008 study reported that L. reuteri effectively suppressed H. pylori infection and decreased the occurrence of dyspeptic symptoms, although it did not improve the outcome of antibiotic therapy. A 2015 study reported a pronounced anti-helicobacter activity and L. reuteri use as an adjuvant therapy in children, especially in the case of detection of infection with H. pylori with no absolute indication of eradication.

In patients with intestinal methanogen overgrowth (IMO), there is evidence that L. reuteri DSM 17938 can reduce methane production and alleviate constipation associated with the disorder.

==== Oral health ====
L. reuteri may promote dental health, as it has been proven to kill Streptococcus mutans, a bacterium responsible for tooth decay. A screen of several probiotic bacteria reported that L. reuteri was the only tested species able to block S. mutans. Clinical trials reported that people whose mouths are colonized with L. reuteri (via dietary supplementation) have significantly less S. mutans. These studies were short-term and did not assess whether L. reuteri prevents tooth decay.

Gingivitis may be ameliorated by L. reuteri. Patients afflicted with severe gingivitis reported decreased gum bleeding, plaque formation and other gingivitis-associated symptoms compared with placebo after chewing gum containing L. reuteri.

==== Bone density ====
L. reuteri and other probiotics may influence the gut microbiome in ways that protect against bone loss, common in post-menopausal women.

==== General health ====
By protecting against many common infections, L. reuteri promotes overall wellness. Double-blind, randomized studies in child care centers reported L. reuteri-fed infants fall sick less often, require fewer doctor visits and are absent fewer days from the center compared to placebo and to the competing probiotic Bifidobacterium lactis.

Similar results have been reported in adults; those consuming L. reuteri daily end up falling ill 50% less often, as measured by their decrease use of sick leave.

=== Results in animal models ===
Due to ethical constraints, many of L. reuteri's effects have been studied only in animal models, such as pigs and mice.

In general, animal studies on L. reuteri use the species-specific strain of the bacterium.

==== Protection against pathogens ====
L. reuteri confers a high level of resistance to the pathogen Salmonella typhimurium, halving mortality rates in mice, chickens, and turkeys.

L. reuteri is effective in stopping harmful strains of E. coli from affecting their hosts. A 1997 study performed in chickens reported L. reuteri was as potent as the antibiotic gentamicin in preventing E. coli-related deaths.

The protozoic parasite Cryptosporidium parvum causes severe watery diarrhea, which can become life-threatening in immunocompromised (as in individuals infected with HIV) patients. L. reuteri is reported to lessen the symptoms of C. parvum infection in mice and pigs.

A protective effect against the yeast Candida albicans has been reported in mice, but L. reuteri is less effective than other probiotic organisms, such as L. acidophilus and L. casei.

==== Body weight and growth ====
In juvenile commercial livestock, such as turkey poults and piglets, body weight and growth rate are good health indicators. Animals raised in commercial farms are generally less healthy (and therefore weigh less) than those raised in less industrial settings. In turkeys, for example, this phenomenon is known as "poult growth depression", or PGD.

Supplementing diets with L. reuteri helped them to largely overcome the stresses of industrial habitats. Commercial turkeys fed L. reuteri from birth had nearly a 10% higher adult body weight than their peers raised in the same conditions. A similar study on piglets reported L. reuteri is at least as effective as synthetic antibiotics in improving body weight.

The mechanism by which L. reuteri supports healthy growth is not understood. It possibly protects against illness caused by S. typhimurium and other pathogens, which are more common in commercial environments. However, other studies reported that it can help when the growth depression is caused by a lack of dietary protein, rather than by infectious disease. This raises the possibility that L. reuteri somehow improves the intestines' ability to absorb and process nutrients.

==== Chemical and trauma-induced injury ====
Treating colonic tissue from rats with acetic acid causes an injury similar to human ulcerative colitis. Treating injured tissue with L. reuteri immediately after removing the acid was reported to almost completely reverse any ill effects.

In addition to its role in digestion, the intestinal wall is vital in preventing harmful bacteria, endotoxins, etc., from "leaking" into the bloodstream. This leaking, known as bacterial "translocation", can lead to lethal conditions such as sepsis. In humans, translocation is more likely to occur following such events as liver injury and ingestion of some poisons. In rodent studies, L. reuteri was reported to greatly reduce the amount of bacterial translocation following either the surgical removal of the liver or injection with D-galactosamine, a chemical which causes liver damage.

Methotrexate causes severe enterocolitis in high doses. L. reuteri mitigates the symptoms of methotrexate-induced enterocolitis in rats, one of which is bacterial translocation.

==== Links to fat in diet of mice, and reversible symptoms of behavioral abnormalities ====
In mice, the absence of L. reuteri has been causally linked to maternal diet. A gut microbial imbalance, lacking in L. reuteri, was linked to behavioral abnormalities consistent with autism in humans. These symptoms were reversible by supplementing L. reuteri.
