= Bees wine =

Home-brewed alcoholic drink

Bees wine, also known as "beeswine", "bee wine" and by a variety of other local names, was a home-brewed "folk" alcoholic drink popular during the late 19th and early 20th century particularly in rural areas of the United States and United Kingdom. It was produced using the fermentation of sugar, treacle or molasses by a symbiotic culture of wild yeasts and bacteria.

The cultures were known as "wine bees", "beer seeds", "beer bees", "Californian bees", "Mesopotamia bees", or by a variety of other names, "as bees of almost any locality sufficiently remote to render verification difficult".

== History and production ==
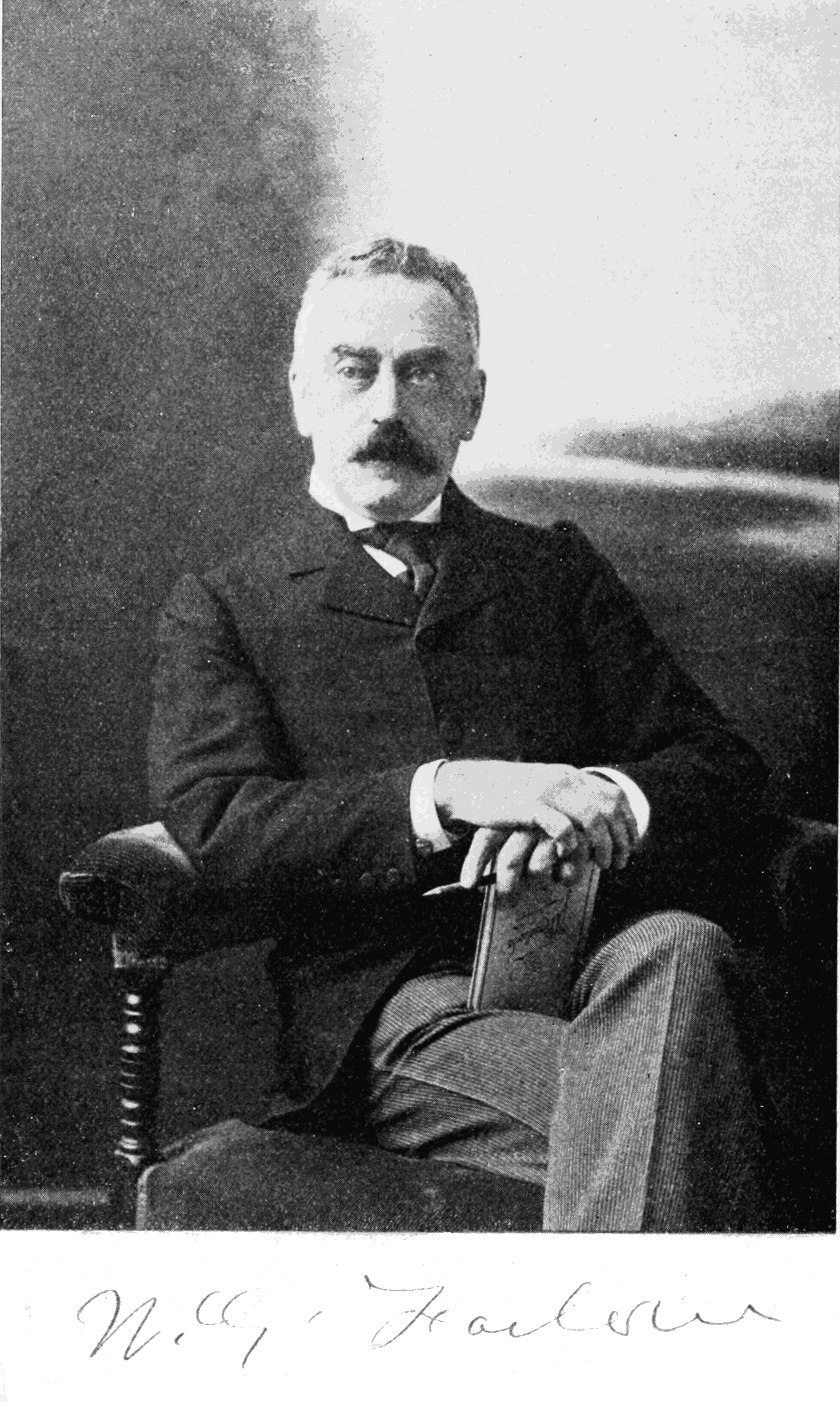
Botanist William Gilson Farlow, who collected specimens of "bees wine"-type cultures and advised Charles L. Mix on his 1891 paper On a Kephir-Like Yeast Found in the United States

"Bees wine" was recorded as far back as the 1850s in America. In 1891 Dr. Charles L. Mix published a paper on "bees wine" in the Proceedings of the American Academy of Arts and Sciences, noting that the cultures used for fermentation were similar to, although with distinct differences from, kefir and suggested adopting the term "American Kephir" to describe them. The origin of the cultures remained unknown: much as for kefir, stories circulated they had been brought back from overseas by returning soldiers, though some correspondents to American journals noted that starter cultures could be simply made at home. A culture could be started by exposing a mixture of cornmeal and molasses to the air, allowing colonisation by wild yeasts present in the raw materials.

The drink was made by fermentation of brown sugar or treacle, primarily by the yeast Saccharomyces pyriformis in combination with the bacteria Lentilactobacillus hilgardii. Dried fruit such as raisins could also be added. While fermenting, the lumps of yeast rose and fell in the brew due to bubbles of gas, hence the popular name of "bees", although Dorothy Hartley, in her book Food in England, suggested the name was due to the "faint humming noise" made by the fermentation. The finished product was said to resemble "cider, but sweeter and more intoxicating". Hartley noted that "it is quite epidemic in England: suddenly someone starts the 'bee' and others are fascinated [...] so it spreads a fashion from village to village and street to street, though it seems to be chiefly a country conceit".

The "bees" were often stated to be identical to the "ginger beer plant" culture used with different ingredients to produce home made ginger beer, although it has also been suggested the cultures were different; analysis of the cultures showed that several different varieties were in circulation, and that they did not seem to have a common origin. A 1921 study showed that grains recently available gave a result containing about 3% alcohol, but noted that this was a "poor specimen" and that cultures twenty years previously had been reported by various authors as producing 9–11.3%.

In the 1920s "bees wine" cultures were circulated commercially by mail order and a variety of vague health benefits were claimed for the drink. Such products were noted to have become of greater interest in the aftermath of prohibition in the United States. The United States Department of Agriculture eventually took steps to advise the public that the cultures being advertised had little intrinsic value, and that a fermentation based on wild yeasts might contain "harmful as well as desirable organisms".

The National Collection of Yeast Cultures holds an old sample of "bees wine", noting "the bacteria are Lactobacilli and an unknown Gram positive rod that forms a gelatinous sheath that coils and traps the other cells in it ... The yeasts that have been isolated from the mixture include Saccharomyces cerevisiae, Brettanomyces anomalus and Hansenula anomala". The NCYC sample does not, however, appear to include Saccharomyces pyriformis.

== See also ==
- Kefir
- Tibicos
