= Ginger beer =

Sweetened carbonated beverage

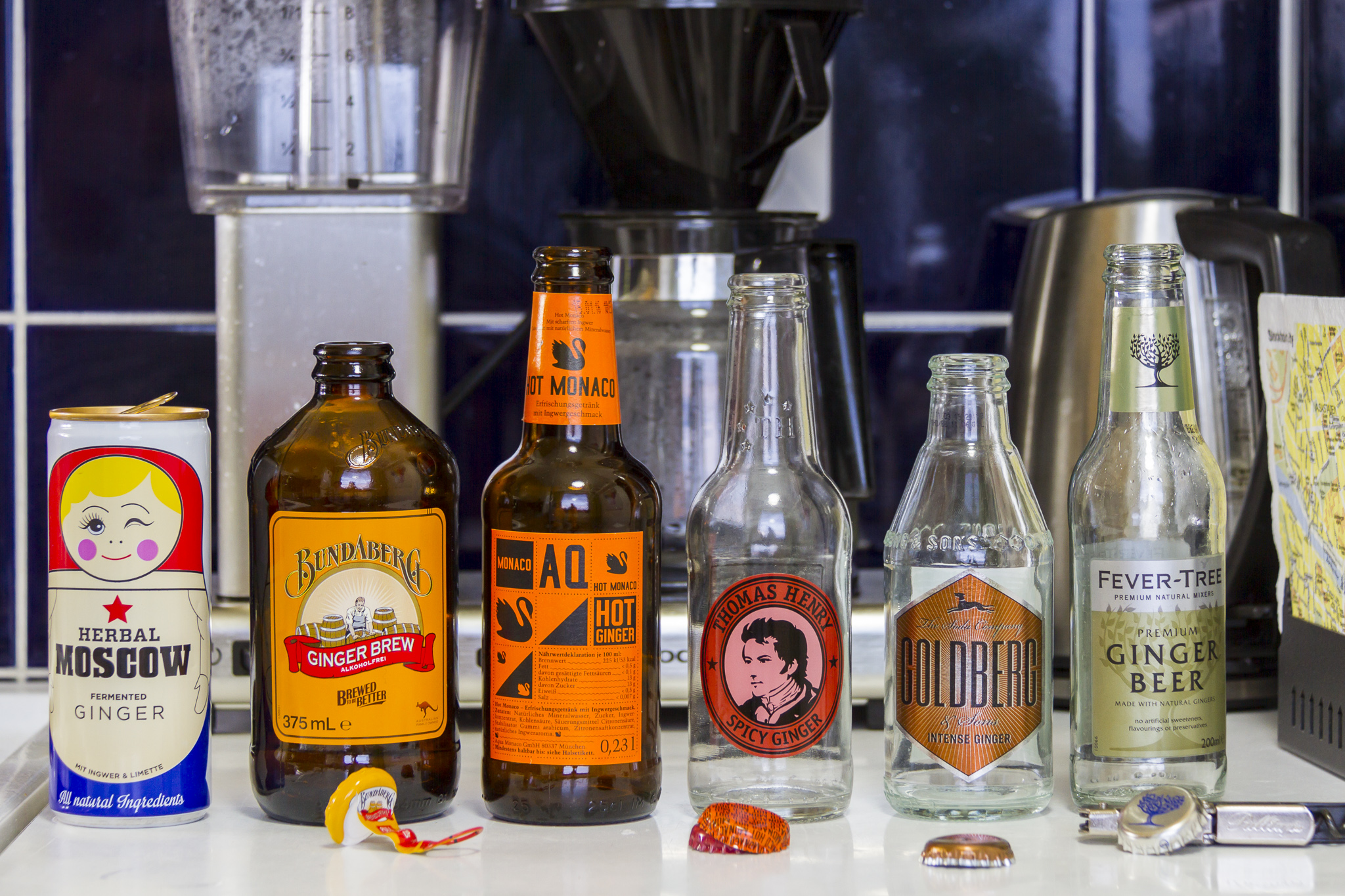
- Moscow Herbal, Bundaberg, Aqua Monaco, Thomas Henry, Goldberg and Fever-Tree
- Origin: England
- Ingredients: ginger spice, yeast and sugar

Ginger beer is a sweetened and carbonated, usually non-alcoholic, type of soft drink. Historically it was a type of beer brewed by the natural fermentation of prepared ginger spice, yeast and sugar. Modern ginger beers are often manufactured rather than brewed, frequently with flavour and colour additives, with artificial carbonation. The related ginger ales also are not brewed.

Ginger beer is still produced at home using a type of symbiotic colony of yeast and Lactobacillus bacteria (SCOBY) known as a "ginger beer plant", or from a "ginger bug" starter created from fermenting ginger, sugar, and water.

== History ==
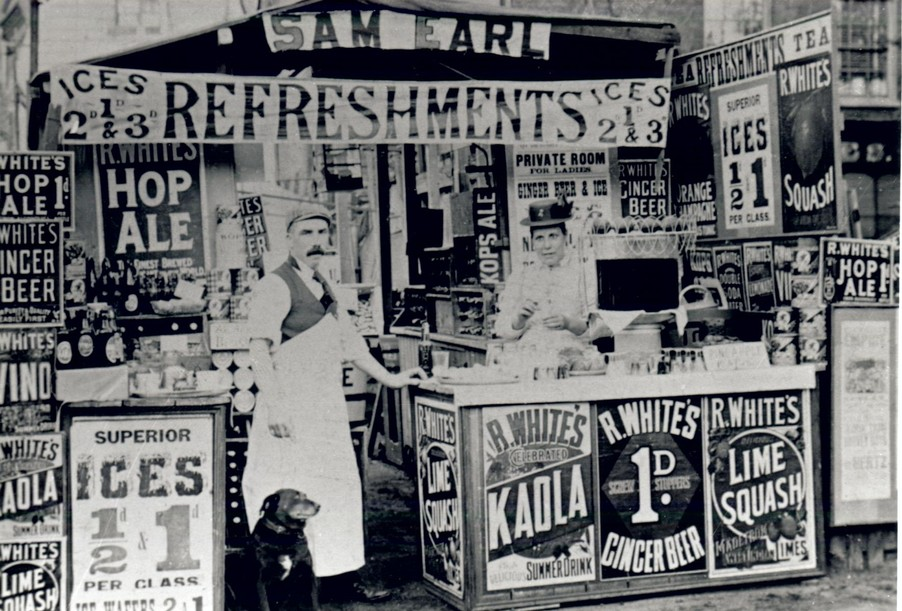
R. White's soft drinks, including ginger beer, sold in England in the early 1900s

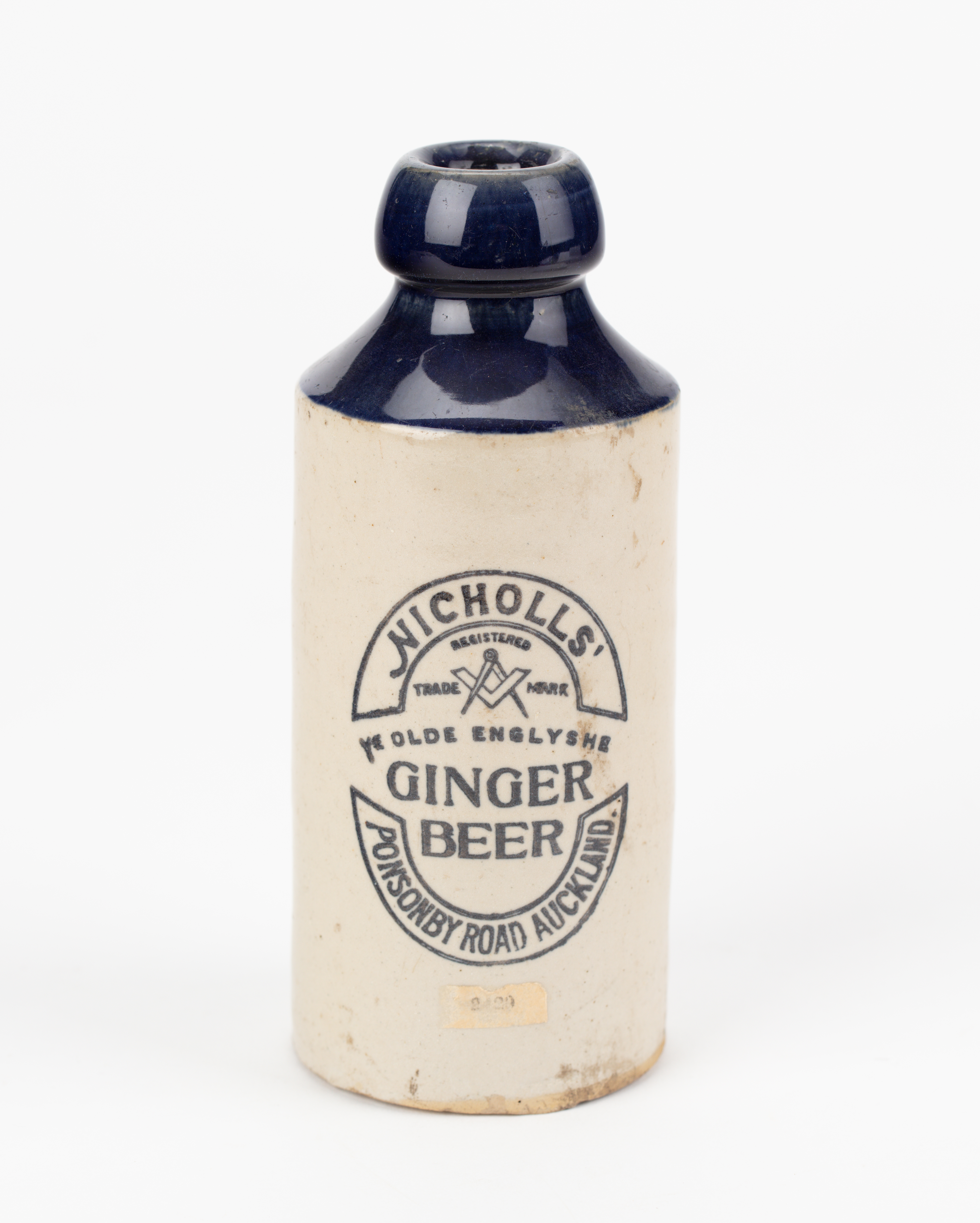
Bottle of ginger beer produced on Ponsonby Road, Auckland, New Zealand, circa 1900

Brewed ginger beer originated in Yorkshire in England in the mid-18th century and appeared in Canada and the United States around 1790. Until the mid-19th century, many ginger beers contained alcohol, at about 11%. In 1855 this became legally limited to 2% in England.

The drink reached a peak of popularity in US in 1920, before Prohibition saw it replaced with ginger ale and other soft drinks. In England and Canada its popularity peaked in 1935.

== Modern beverage ==
=== Alcoholic ginger beer ===
Brewed ginger beer originated in the UK, but is sold worldwide. It is usually labelled "alcoholic ginger beer" to distinguish it from the more established commercial ginger beers, which are often not brewed using fermentation but carbonated with pressurized carbon dioxide, though traditional non-alcoholic ginger beer may also be produced by brewing.

=== Non-alcoholic ===
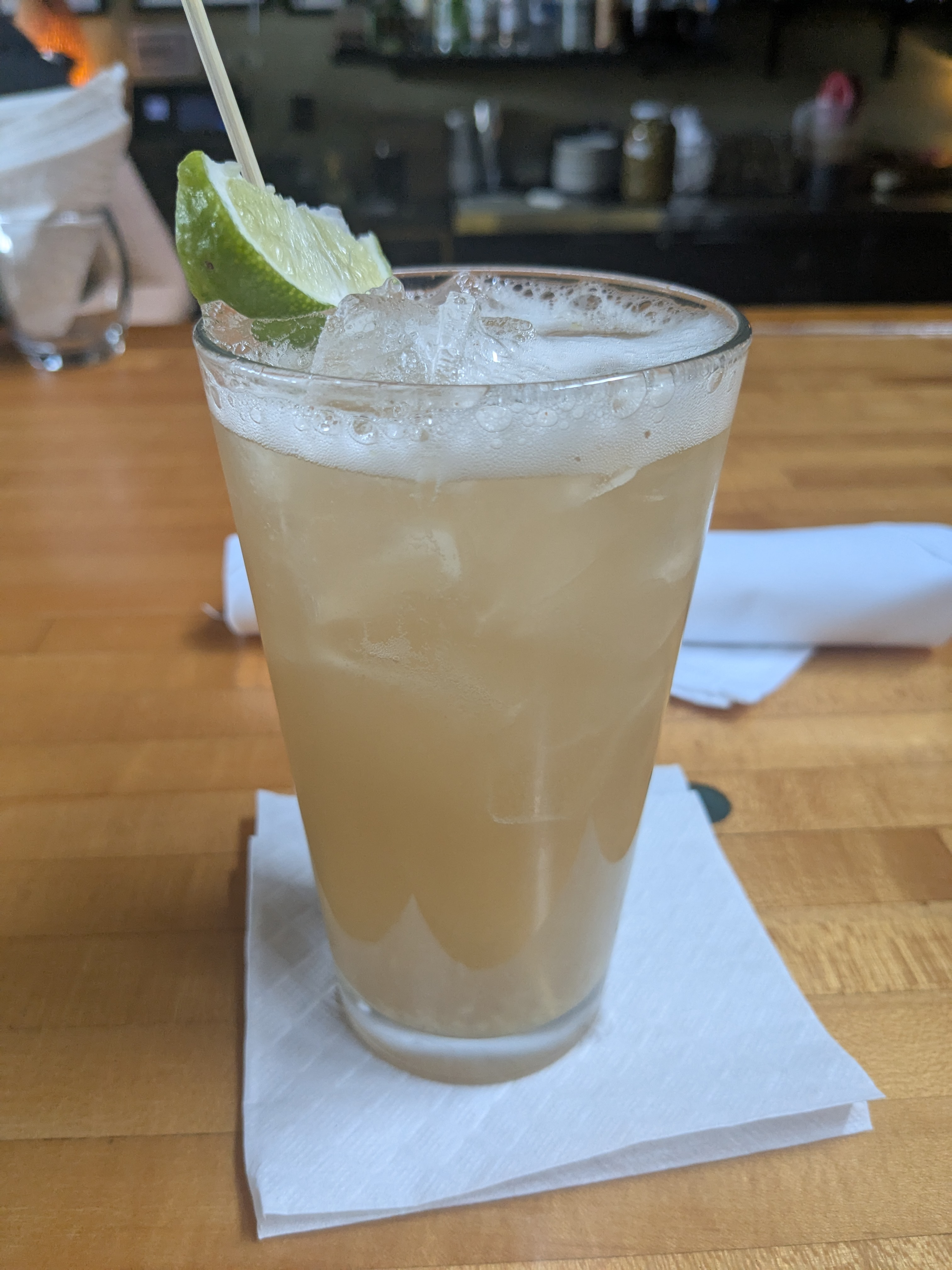
Homemade ginger beer served at a bar

Non-alcoholic ginger beers are made by brewing, followed by heating to reduce alcohol content to below 0.5% ABV, below which beverages are legally classified as "non-alcoholic" in many jurisdictions. Ginger beer can be served by itself or as part of a cocktail. Ginger beer is more strongly flavoured with ginger and less sweet compared to ginger ale.

The ginger beer soft drink may be mixed with beer (usually a British ale of some sort) to make one type of shandy, or with dark rum to make a drink, originally from Bermuda, called a Dark 'N' Stormy. It is the main ingredient in the Moscow Mule cocktail, though ginger ale may be substituted when ginger beer is unavailable.

== Production ==
=== Ginger beer plant ===
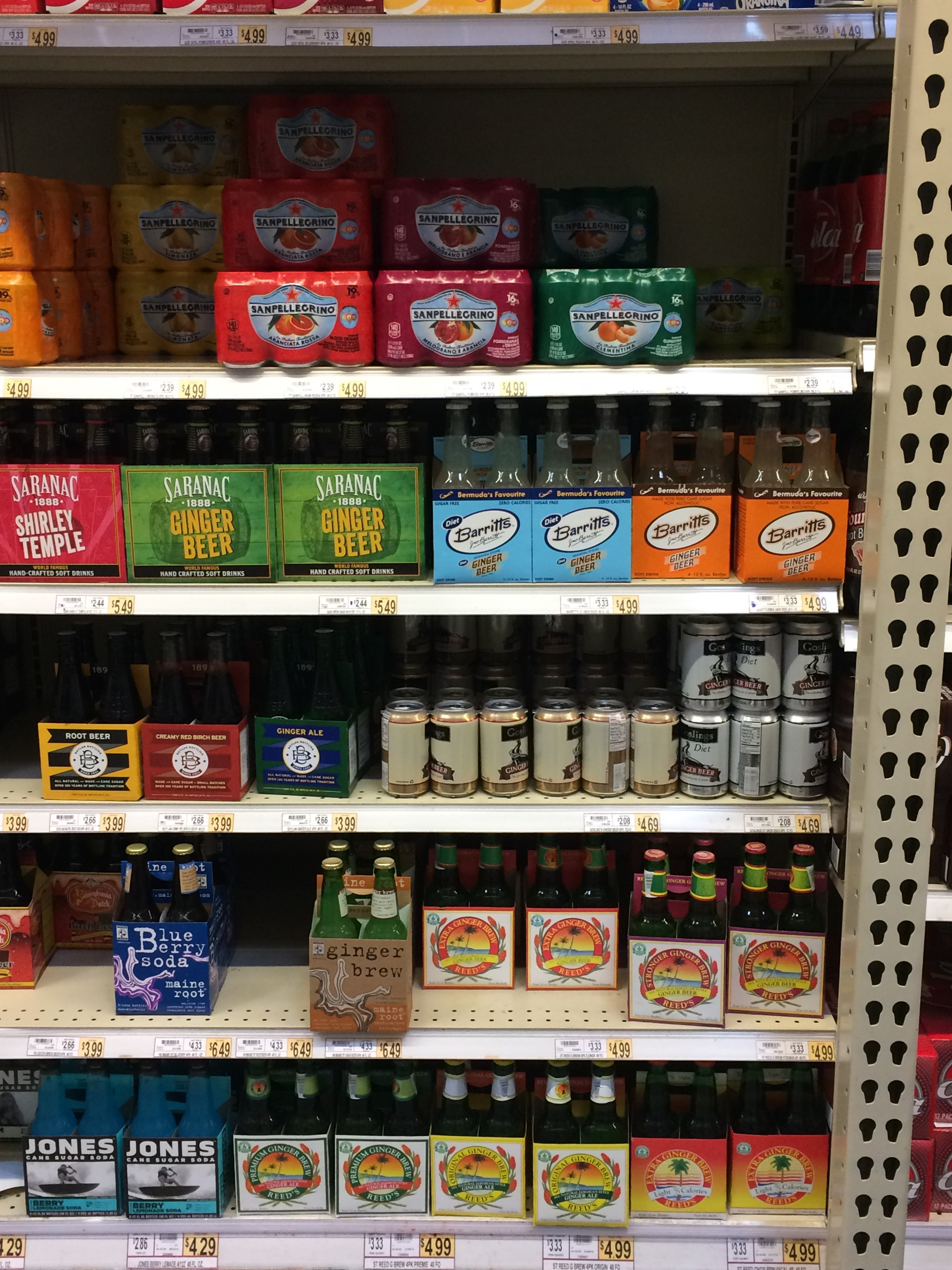
Several ginger beer brands on a supermarket shelf

Ginger beer plant (GBP), a form of fermentation starter, is used to create the fermentation process. Ginger beer was defined by Harry Marshall Ward as “beverage containing a symbiotic mixture of yeast and bacteria, and containing sufficient amounts of nitrogenous organic matter and beet sugar or cane sugar in its aqueous solution”. The GBP was first described by Ward in 1892, from samples he received in 1887.

Also known as "bees wine", "Palestinian bees", "Californian bees", and "balm of Gilead", it is not a plant but a composite organism comprising the yeast Saccharomyces florentinus (formerly S. pyriformis) and the bacterium Lactobacillus hilgardii (formerly Brevibacterium vermiforme), which form a symbiotic culture of bacteria and yeast (SCOBY). It forms a gelatinous substance that allows it to be easily transferred from one fermenting substrate to the next, much like kefir grains, kombucha, and tibicos. Original ginger beer is brewed by leaving water, sugar, ginger, optional ingredients such as lemon juice and cream of tartar, and GBP to ferment for several days, converting some of the sugar into alcohol. GBP may be obtained from several commercial sources. Until about 2008 laboratory-grade GBP was available only from the yeast bank Deutsche Sammlung von Mikroorganismen und Zellkulturen in Germany (catalogue number DMS 2484), but the item is no longer listed. The National Collection of Yeast Cultures (NCYC) had an old sample of "Bees wine" as of 2008, but current staff have not used it, and NCYC are unable to supply it for safety reasons, as the exact composition of the sample is unknown.

In the UK, the origin of the original ginger beer plant is unknown. When a batch of ginger beer was made using some ginger beer "plant" (GBP), the jelly-like residue was also bottled and became the new GBP. Some of this GBP was kept for making the next batch of ginger beer, and some was given to friends and family, so the plant was passed on through generations. Following Ward's research and experiments, he created his own ginger beer from a new plant that he had made, and he proposed, but did not prove, that the plant was created by contaminants found on the raw materials, with the yeast coming from the raw brown sugar and the bacteria coming from the ginger root.

=== Yeast starter ===
An alternative method of instigating fermentation is using a ginger beer starter, often called a "ginger bug", which can be made by fermenting a mixture of water, brewer's or baker's yeast (not the SCOBY described above), ginger, and sugar. This is kept for a week or longer, with sugar regularly added, e.g., daily, to increase alcohol content. More ginger may also be added. When finished, this concentrated mix is strained, diluted with water and lemon juice, and bottled. This is the process used by some commercial ginger beer makers. Ginger beer made from a yeast-based starter is reported to not have the same taste or mouth feel as that made with ginger beer plant. The near-complete loss of the ginger beer plant is likely due to the decrease in home brewing and the increased commercial production of ginger beer in the late 1800s and early 1900s. Large-scale breweries favoured the use of yeast, as used in conventional beer-making, because of ease for scaled production.

== See also ==
- Crabbie's – Brand of alcoholic ginger beer
- Ginger ale – Soft drink flavoured with ginger
- Root beer – North American carbonated beverage
- Barritt's Ginger Beer – Bermudan beverage brand
- Sockerdricka – Swedish soft drink brand
- Caribbean cuisine – Cuisine of the Caribbean
- Ginger wine – Fortified wine
- Domaine de Canton (liqueur) – Flavored liqueur
- List of soft drink flavors
- Donoghue v Stevenson – 1932 UK landmark court case on negligence, legal case involving ginger beer
