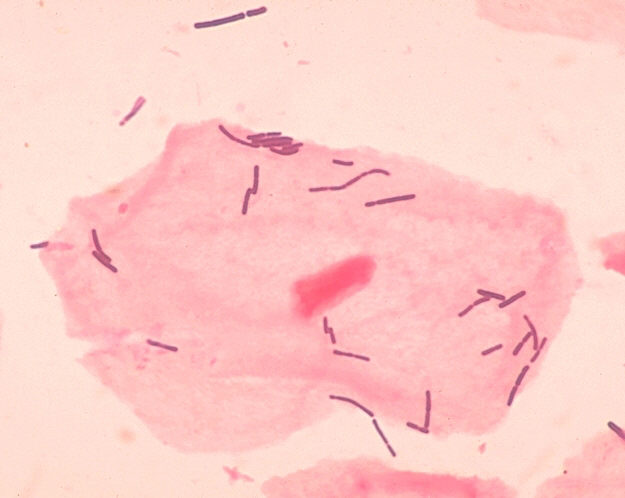
- Lactobacillus sp. near a squamous epithelial cell

Scientific classification
- Domain: Bacteria
- Kingdom: Bacillati
- Phylum: Bacillota
- Class: Bacilli
- Order: Lactobacillales
- Family: Lactobacillaceae
- Genus: Lactobacillus; Beijerinck 1901 (Approved Lists 1980)

Type species
- Lactobacillus delbrueckii (Leichmann 1896) Beijerinck 1927 (Approved Lists 1980)

Species
- See text

= Lactobacillus =

Genus of bacteria

Lactobacillus is a genus of gram-positive bacteria within the Lactobacillaceae family. Members of the genus are aerotolerant anaerobes or microaerophilic, rod-shaped, and do not form endospores. Until 2020, the genus Lactobacillus comprised 261 phylogenetically, ecologically, and metabolically diverse species; a taxonomic revision of the genus reassigned many former Lactobacillus species to 25 genera (see § Taxonomy below).

Lactobacillus species constitute a significant component of the human and animal microbiota at a number of body sites, such as the digestive system and female genital system. Lactobacillus species are normally a major part of the vaginal microbiota. Lactobacillus forms biofilms in the vaginal and gut microbiota, allowing them to persist in harsh environmental conditions and maintain ample populations. Lactobacillus exhibits a mutualistic relationship with the human body, as it protects the host against potential invasions by pathogens, and in turn, the host provides a source of nutrients. Lactobacilli are among the most common probiotics found in food such as yogurt, and the bacteria are diverse in their application in maintaining well-being, by helping to treat diarrhea, vaginal infections, and skin disorders such as eczema.

== Metabolism ==
Lactobacilli are homofermentative, i.e., hexoses are metabolized by glycolysis to lactate as the major end product, or heterofermentative, i.e., hexoses are metabolized by the phosphoketolase pathway to lactate, CO_{2}, and acetate or ethanol as major end products. Most lactobacilli are aerotolerant and some species respire if heme and menaquinone are present in the growth medium. Aerotolerance of lactobacilli is manganese-dependent and has been explored (and explained) in Lactiplantibacillus plantarum (previously Lactobacillus plantarum). Lactobacilli generally do not require iron for growth.

The Lactobacillaceae are the only family of the lactic acid bacteria (LAB) that includes homofermentative and heterofermentative organisms; in the Lactobacillaceae, homofermentative or heterofermentative metabolism is shared by all strains of a genus. Lactobacillus species are all homofermentative, do not express pyruvate formate lyase, and most species do not ferment pentoses. In L. crispatus, pentose metabolism is strain specific and acquired by lateral gene transfer.

== Genomes ==
The genomes of lactobacilli are highly variable, ranging in size from 1.2 to 4.9 Mb (megabases). Accordingly, the number of protein-coding genes ranges from 1,267 to about 4,758 genes (in Fructilactobacillus sanfranciscensis and Lentilactobacillus parakefiri, respectively). Even within a single species, there can be substantial variation. For instance, strains of L. crispatus have genome sizes ranging from 1.83 to 2.7 Mb, or 1,839 to 2,688 open reading frames. Lactobacillus contains a wealth of compound microsatellites in the coding region of the genome, which are imperfect and have variant motifs. Many lactobacilli also contain multiple plasmids. A recent study has revealed that plasmids encode the genes which are required for adaptation of lactobacilli to the given environment.

== Species ==
The genus Lactobacillus comprises the following species:

- Lactobacillus acetotolerans Entani et al. 1986
- Lactobacillus acidophilus (Moro 1900) Hansen and Mocquot 1970 (Approved Lists 1980)
- Lactobacillus agrestimuris Afrizal et al. 2023
- Lactobacillus amylolyticus Bohak et al. 1999
- Lactobacillus amylovorus Nakamura 1981
- Lactobacillus apis Killer et al. 2014
- Lactobacillus bombicola Praet et al. 2015
- Lactobacillus colini Zhang et al. 2017
- Lactobacillus corticus Tohno et al. 2021
- Lactobacillus crispatus (Brygoo and Aladame 195555) Moore and Holdeman 1970 (Approved Lists 1980)
- Lactobacillus delbrueckii (Leichmann 1896) Beijerinck 1901 (Approved Lists 1980)
- Lactobacillus equicursoris Morita et al. 2010
- Lactobacillus fornicalis Dicks et al. 2000
- Lactobacillus gallinarum Fujisawa et al. 1992
- Lactobacillus gasseri Lauer and Kandler 1980
- Lactobacillus gigeriorum Cousin et al. 2012
- Lactobacillus hamsteri Mitsuoka and Fujisawa 1988
- Lactobacillus helsingborgensis Olofsson et al. 2014
- Lactobacillus helveticus (Orla-Jensen 1919) Bergey et al. 1925 (Approved Lists 1980)
- Lactobacillus hominis Cousin et al. 2013
- Lactobacillus huangpiensis Li and Gu 2022
- Lactobacillus iners Falsen et al. 1999
- Lactobacillus intestinalis (ex Hemme 1974) Fujisawa et al. 1990
- Lactobacillus isalae Eilers et al. 2023
- Lactobacillus jensenii Gasser et al. 1970 (Approved Lists 1980)
- Lactobacillus juensis Jiang and Gu 2024
- Lactobacillus johnsonii Fujisawa et al. 1992
- Lactobacillus kalixensis Roos et al. 2005
- Lactobacillus kefiranofaciens Fujisawa et al. 1988
- Lactobacillus kimbladii Olofsson et al. 2014
- Lactobacillus kitasatonis Mukai et al. 2003
- Lactobacillus kullabergensis Olofsson et al. 2014
- Lactobacillus laiwuensis Li and Gu 2022
- Lactobacillus leichmannii (Henneberg 1903) Bergey et al. 1923 (Approved Lists 1980)
- Lactobacillus melliventris Olofsson et al. 2014
- Lactobacillus mulieris Rocha et al. 2020
- Lactobacillus nasalidis Suzuki-Hashido et al. 2021
- Lactobacillus panisapium Wang et al. 2018
- Lactobacillus paragasseri Tanizawa et al. 2018
- Lactobacillus pasteurii Cousin et al. 2013
- Lactobacillus porci Kim et al. 2018
- Lactobacillus psittaci Lawson et al. 2001
- Lactobacillus rhamnosus (Hansen 1968) Collins et al. 1989
- Lactobacillus rizhaonensis Jiang and Gu 2024
- Lactobacillus rodentium Killer et al. 2014
- Lactobacillus rogosae Holdeman and Moore 1974 (Approved Lists 1980)
- Lactobacillus taiwanensis Wang et al. 2009
- Lactobacillus timonensis Afouda et al. 2017
- Lactobacillus ultunensis Roos et al. 2005
- Lactobacillus xujianguonis Meng et al. 2020
- Lactobacillus xylocopicola Kawasaki et al. 2024

== Taxonomy ==
As of 2025, the genus Lactobacillus contains 50 validly published species which are adapted to vertebrate hosts or to insects. In recent years, other members of the genus Lactobacillus (formerly known as the Leuconostoc branch of Lactobacillus) have been reclassified into the genera Atopobium, Carnobacterium, Weissella, Oenococcus, and Leuconostoc. The Pediococcus species P. dextrinicus has been reclassified as a Lapidilactobacillus dextrinicus and most lactobacilli were assigned to Paralactobacillus or one of the 23 novel genera of the Lactobacillaceae. Two websites inform on the assignment of species to the novel genera or species (http://www.lactobacillus.uantwerpen.be/; http://www.lactobacillus.ualberta.ca/).

The 23 New Genera of 2020
Genus	Meaning of the genus name	Properties of the genus
Lactobacillus	Rod-shaped bacillus from milk	Type species: L. delbrueckii. Homofermentative with strain-specific ability to ferment pentoses, thermophilic, vancomycin-sensitive, adapted to vertebrate or insect hosts.
Holzapfelia	Wilhelm Holzapfel's lactobacilli	Type species: H. floricola. Homofermentative, vancomycin sensitive, unknown ecology but likely host-adapted.
Amylolactobacillus	Starch-degrading lactobacilli	Type species: A. amylophilus. Homofermentative, vancomycin sensitive, extracellular amylases are frequent, unknown ecology but likely host-adapted.
Bombilactobacillus	Lactobacilli from bees and bumblebees	Type species: B. mellifer. Homofermentative, thermophilic, vancomycin resistant, small genome size, adapted to bees and bumblebees
Companilactobacillus	Companion-lactobacillus, referring to them growing in association with other lactobacilli in cereal, meat and vegetable fermentations	Type species: C. alimentarius. Homofermentative with strain- or species-specific ability to ferment pentoses, vancomycin resistant, unknown ecology, likely nomadic
Lapidilactobacillus	Lactobacilli from stones	Type species: L. concavus. Homofermentative with strain- or species-specific ability to ferment pentoses, vancomycin resistant, unknown ecology.
Agrilactobacillus	Lactobacilli from fields	Type species: A. composti. Homofermentative, aerotolerant and vancomycin resistant. Genome size, G+C content of the genome and the source of the two species suggest a free-living lifestyle of the genus.
Schleiferilactobacillus	Karl Heinz Schleifer's lactobacilli	Type species: S. perolens. Homofermentative, vancomycin resistant, aerotolerant. Schleiferilactobacillus spp. have a large genome size, ferment a wide range of carbohydrates, and spoil beer and dairy products by copious production of diacetyl.
Loigolactobacillus	(Food) spoiling lactobacilli	Type species: L. coryniformis. Homofermentative, vancomycin resistant, mesophilic or psychrotrophic organisms.
Lacticaseibacillus	Lactobacilli related to cheese	Type species: L. casei. Homofermentative, vancomycin resistant; many species ferment pentoses, and are resistant to oxidative stress. L. casei and related species have a nomadic lifestyle.
Latilactobacillus	Widespread lactobacilli	Type species: L. sakei. Homofermentative, mesophilic free living and environmental lactobacilli. Many strains are psychrotrophic and grow below 8 °C.
Dellaglioa	Franco Dellaglio's lactobacilli	Type species: D. algida. Homofermentative, vancomycin resistant, aerotolerant and psychrophilic.
Liquorilactobacillus	Lactobacilli from liquor or liquids	Type species: L. mali. Homofermentative, vancomycin resistant, motile organisms growing in liquid, plant-associated habitats. Many liquorilactobacilli produce EPS from sucrose and degrade fructans with extracellular fructanases.
Ligilactobacillus	Uniting (host adapted) lactobacilli	Type species: L. salivarius. Homofermentative, vancomycin resistant, most ligilactobacilli are host adapted and many strains are motile. Several strains of Ligilactobacillus express urease to withstand gastric acidity.
Lactiplantibacillus	Lactobacilli related to plants	Type species: L. plantarum. Homofermentative, vancomycin resistant organisms with a nomadic lifestyle that ferment a wide range of carbohydrates; most species metabolise phenolic acids by esterase, decarboxylase and reductase activities. L. plantarum expresses pseudocatalase and nitrate reductase activities.
Furfurilactobacillus	Lactobacilli from bran	Type species: F. rossiae. Heterofermentative, vancomycin resistant, with large genome size, broad metabolic potential and unknown ecology.
Paucilactobacillus	Lactobacilli fermenting few carbohydrates	Type species: P. vaccinostercus. Heterofermentative, vancomycin resistant, mesophilic or psychrotrophic, aerotolerant, most strains ferment pentoses but not disaccharides.
Limosilactobacillus	Slimy (biofilm-forming) lactobacilli	Type species: L. fermentum. Heterofermentative, thermophilic, vancomycin resistant with two exceptions, Limosilactobacillus species are vertebrate host adapted and generally form exopolysaccharides from sucrose to support biofilm formation in the upper intestine of animals.
Fructilactobacillus	Fructose-loving lactobacilli	Type species: F. fructivorans. Heterofermentative, vancomycin resistant, mesophilic, aerotolerant, small genome size. Fructilactobacilli are adapted to narrow ecological niches that relate to insects, flowers, or both.
Acetilactobacillus	Lactobacilli from vinegar	Type species: A. jinshani. Heterofermentative, vancomycin resistant, grow in the pH range of 3–5; fermenting disaccharides and sugar alcohols but few hexoses and no pentoses.
Apilactobacillus	Lactobacilli from bees	Type species: A. kunkeei. Heterofermentative, vancomycin resistant, small genome size, fermenting only few carbohydrates, adapted to bees and/or flowers.
Levilactobacillus	(Dough)-leavening lactobacilli	Type species: L. brevis. Heterofermentative, vancomycin resistant, mesophilic or psychrotrophic, metabolise agmatine, environmental or plant-associated lifestyle.
Secundilactobacillus	Second lactobacilli, growing after other organisms depleted hexoses	Type species: S. collinoides. Heterofermentative, vancomycin resistant, mesophilic or psychrotrophic, environmental or plant-associated lifestyle. Adapted to hexose-depleted habitats, most strains do not reduce fructose to mannitol but metabolize agmatine and diols.
Lentilactobacillus	Slow (growing) lactobacilli	Type species: L. buchneri. Heterofermentative, vancomycin resistant, mesophilic, fermenting a broad spectrum of carbohydrates. Most lentilactobacilli are environmental or plant-associated, metabolise agmatine and convert lactate and/or diols. L. senioris and L. kribbianus form an outgroup to the genus; both species were isolated from vertrebrates and may transition to a host-adapted lifestyle.

== Phylogeny ==
The currently accepted taxonomy is based on the List of Prokaryotic names with Standing in Nomenclature and the phylogeny is based on whole-genome sequences.

- - Lactobacillus
    - - - - - - - - - - - - Lactobacillus gallinarum
                          - Lactobacillus helveticus
                        - Lactobacillus acidophilus
                      - Lactobacillus ultunensis
                    - Lactobacillus crispatus
                  - - Lactobacillus amylovorus
                    - Lactobacillus kitasatonis
                - Lactobacillus kefiranofaciens
              - Lactobacillus hamsteri
            - - - Lactobacillus gigeriorum
                - Lactobacillus pasteurii
              - - Lactobacillus kilaxensis
                - - Lactobacillus intestinalis
                  - - Lactobacillus amylolyticus
                    - Lactobacillus xujianguonis
          - - Lactobacillus acetotolerans
            - - - - Lactobacillus apis
                  - Lactobacillus panisapium
                - Lactobacillus bombicola
              - - - Lactobacillus helsingborgensis
                  - Lactobacillus melliventris
                - - Lactobacillus kimbladii
                  - Lactobacillus kullabergensis
        - - Lactobacillus porci
          - - Lactobacillus delbrueckii
            - Lactobacillus equicursoris
      - - Lactobacillus psittaci
        - - Lactobacillus fornicalis
          - Lactobacillus jensenii
    - - Lactobacillus rodentium
      - - Lactobacillus iners
        - - Lactobacillus colini
          - - Lactobacillus hominis
            - - Lactobacillus johnsonii
              - - Lactobacillus taiwanensis
                - - Lactobacillus gasseri
                  - Lactobacillus paragasseri
  - outgroup
    Holzapfelia

== Human health ==
=== Vaginal tract ===
Lactobacillus s.s. species are considered "keystone species" in the vaginal microbiota of reproductive-age women. Most, but not all, healthy women have a vaginal microbiota dominated by one of four species of Lactobacillus: L. iners, L. crispatus, L. gasseri, and L. jensenii. Other women have a more diverse mix of anaerobic microorganisms and are still considered to have a healthy microbiome.

=== Interactions with pathogens ===
Lactobacilli produce lactic acid, which contributes to the vaginal acidity, and this lowered pH is generally accepted to be the main mechanism controlling the composition of the vaginal microbiota.

Lactobacilli are also proposed to produce hydrogen peroxide, which inhibits the growth and virulence of the fungal pathogen Candida albicans in vitro, though this is arguably not the main mechanism in vivo.

In vitro studies have also shown that lactobacilli reduce the pathogenicity of C. albicans through the production of organic acids and certain metabolites. Both the presence of metabolites, such as sodium butyrate, and decrease in environmental pH caused by the organic acids reduce the growth of hyphae in C. albicans, which reduces its pathogenicity. Lactobacilli also reduce the pathogenicity of C. albicans by reducing C. albicans biofilm formation. On the other hand, following antibiotic therapy, certain Candida species can suppress the regrowth of lactobacilli at body sites where they cohabitate, such as in the gastrointestinal tract.

In addition to its effects on C. albicans, Lactobacillus sp. also interact with other pathogens. For example, Limosilactobacillus reuteri (formerly Lactobacillus reuteri) can inhibit the growth of many different bacterial species by using glycerol to produce the antimicrobial substance called reuterin. Another example is Ligilactobacillus salivarius (formerly Lactobacillus salivarius), which interacts with many pathogens through the production of salivaricin B, a bacteriocin.

=== Probiotics ===
Because of the interactions with other microbes, fermenting bacteria like lactic acid bacteria (LAB) are now in use as probiotics with many applications.

Lactobacilli administered in combination with other probiotics provides benefits in cases of irritable bowel syndrome (IBS), although the extent of efficacy is still uncertain. The probiotics help treat IBS by re-establishing homeostasis when the gut microbiota experiences unusually high levels of opportunistic bacteria. On a molecular level, the probiotic Lactobacillus strains will interact with the host intestinal epithelial cells and the immune cells through pattern recognition receptors, including toll-like receptors (TLRs), like TLR-2 and TLR-4. The binding of these bacterial surface components such as lipoteichoic acid and peptidoglycan to these receptors can effect NF-κB signaling pathways, resulting in the downregulation of pro-inflammatory cytokines and the upregulation of anti-inflammatory mediators such as IL-10. Additionally, there are certain strains that produce short-chain fatty acids (SCFAs) as a fermentation byproduct, which reinforces the intestinal epithelial barrier by promoting tight junction protein expression, which reduces the intestinal permeability as well as systemic inflammation. In addition, lactobacilli can be administered as probiotics during cases of infection by the ulcer-causing bacterium Helicobacter pylori. Helicobacter pylori is linked to cancer, and antibiotic resistance impedes the success of current antibiotic-based eradication treatments. When probiotic lactobacilli are administered along with the treatment as an adjuvant, its efficacy is substantially increased and side effects may be lessened. In addition, lactobacilli with other probiotic organisms in ripened milk and yogurt aid development of immunity in the intestine mucus in humans by raising the number of immunoglobulin A (IgA (+)) antibodies.

Gastroesophageal reflux disease (GERD) is a common condition associated with bile acid-induced oxidative stress and accumulation of reactive oxygen species (ROS) in esophageal tissues that cause inflammation and DNA damage. In an experimental model of GERD, Lactobacillus species (L. acidophilus, L. plantarum, and L. fermentum) facilitated the repair of DNA damage caused by bile-induced ROS. For patients with GERD, there is significant interest in the anti-inflammatory effect of lactobacilli that may help prevent progression to Barrett's esophagus and esophageal adenocarcinoma.

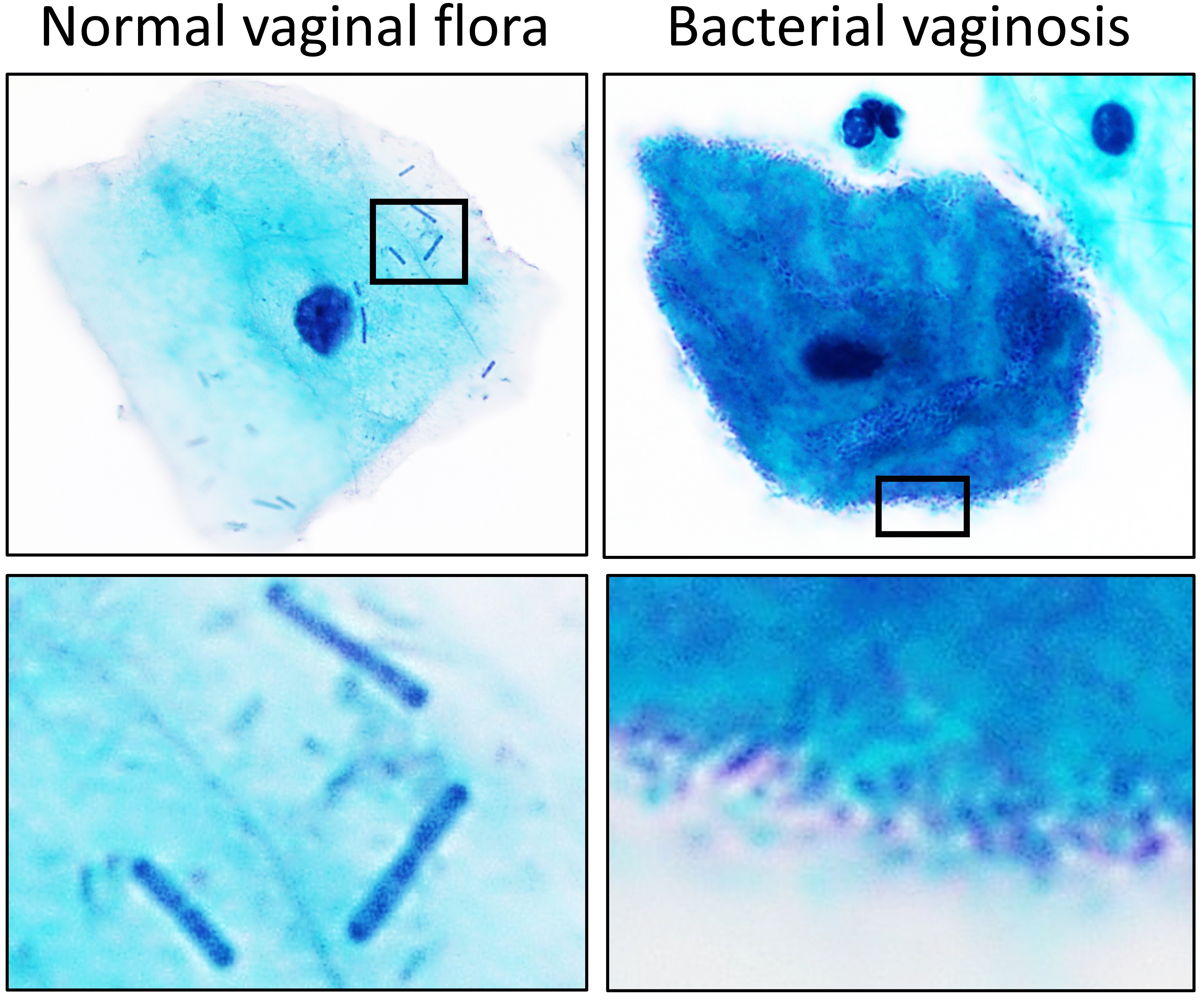
Vaginal squamous cell with normal vaginal microbiota versus bacterial vaginosis on Pap stain. Normal vaginal microbiota (left) is predominantly rod-shaped Lactobacilli, whereas in bacterial vaginosis (right) there is an overgrowth of bacteria, which can be of various species.

Given the known microbial associations, lactobacilli are currently available as probiotics to help control urogenital and vaginal infections, such as bacterial vaginosis (BV). Lactobacilli produce bacteriocins to suppress the pathogenic growth of certain bacteria, as well as lactic acid, which lowers the vaginal pH to around 4.5 or less, hampering the survival of other bacteria. The probiotic potential of Lactobacillus is strain-specific and varies based on the source from which various strains are isolated. Strains that are sourced from fermented foods, dairy products, and the human gastrointestinal tract can differ in their tolerance to acidic and bile-rich environments, antimicrobial activity, and adhesion capacity to intestinal epithelial cells, which is all criteria that is used to evaluate suitability for functional food development. For example, strains that are isolated from healthy infant feces have demonstrated anti-inflammatory activity in vitro, including suppression of pro-inflammatory cytokines such as IL-6 and TNF-α, which suggests that the early-life gut microbiota could be a source for identifying relevant probiotic candidates. The findings show the importance of strain level characterization as opposed to genus level generalizations when looking at probiotic function.

In children, lactobacilli such as Lacticaseibacillus rhamnosus (previously L. rhamnosus) are associated with a reduction of atopic eczema, also known as dermatitis, due to anti-inflammatory cytokines secreted by this probiotic bacteria.

=== Oral health ===
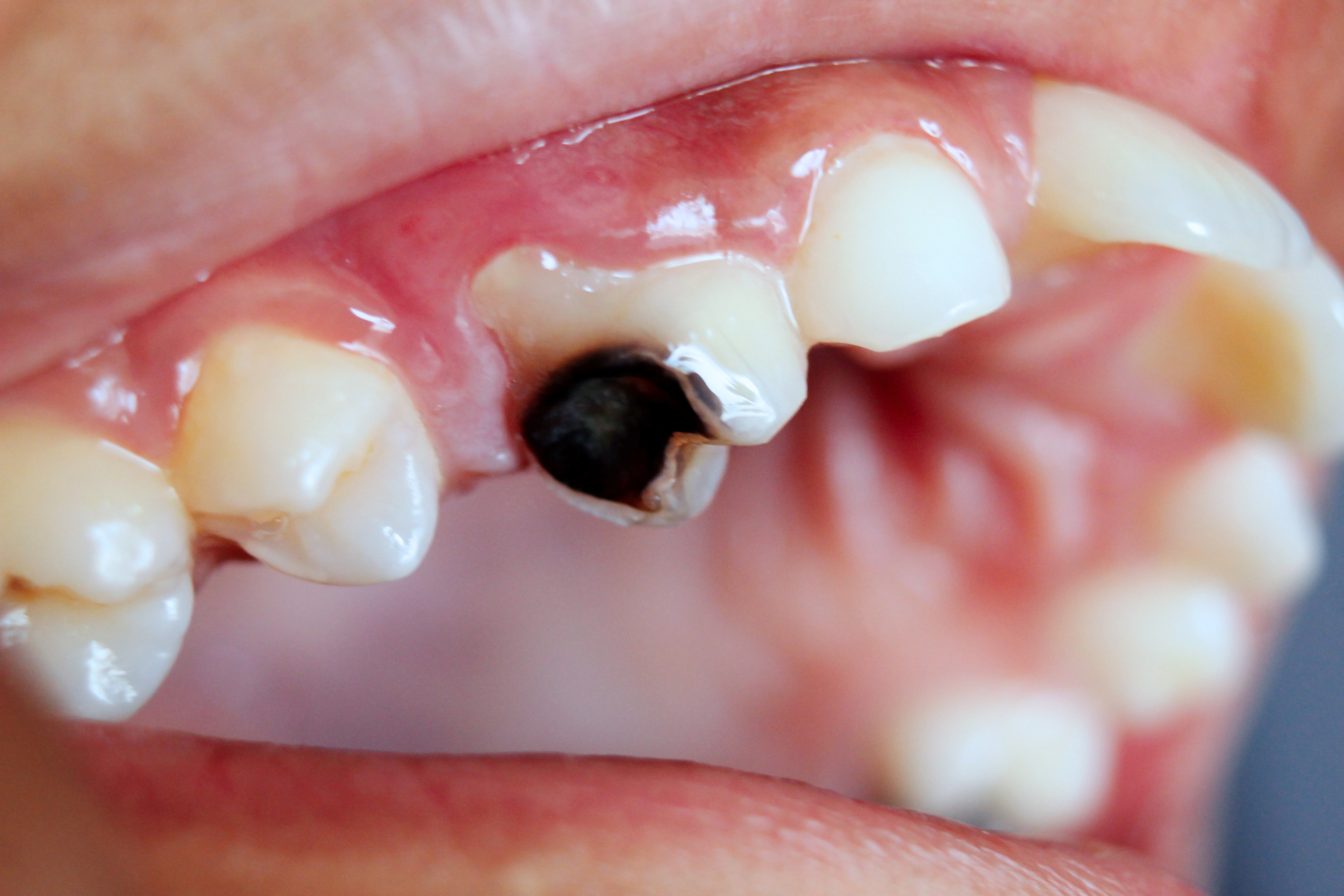
Dental caries

Some lactobacilli have been associated with cases of dental caries (cavities). Lactic acid can corrode teeth, and the Lactobacillus count in saliva has been used as a "caries test" for many years. Lactobacilli characteristically cause existing carious lesions to progress, especially those in coronal caries. The issue is, however, complex, as recent studies show probiotics can allow beneficial lactobacilli to populate sites on teeth, preventing streptococcal pathogens from taking hold and inducing dental decay. The scientific research of lactobacilli in relation to oral health is a new field and only a few studies and results have been published. Some studies have provided evidence of certain lactobacilli which can be a probiotic for oral health. Some species, but not all, show evidence in defense to dental caries. Due to these studies, there have been applications of incorporating such probiotics in chewing gum and lozenges. There is also evidence of certain lactobacilli that are beneficial in the defense of periodontal disease such as gingivitis and periodontitis.

== Food production ==
Species of Lactobacillus (and related genera) comprise many food fermenting lactic acid bacteria and are used as starter cultures in industry for controlled fermentation in the production of wine, yogurt, cheese, sauerkraut, pickles, beer, cider, kimchi, cocoa, kefir, and other fermented foods, as well as animal feeds and the bokashi soil amendment. Lactobacillus species are dominant in yogurt, cheese, and sourdough fermentations. The availability of carbohydrate sources in the food environment affects the performance of the Lactobacillus species as well as the products of the metabolic pathways. In the fermentation of milk products, lactose is the predominant sugar which is fermentable, whereas in vegetables like sauerkraut and kimchi, glucose and fructose are liberated from the plant tissues and act as the primary carbon source. Studies on novel substrates for fermentation have revealed that some lactic acid bacteria have the capability to ferment non-conventional carbohydrate sources for the production of lactic acid.

Their importance in fermentation comes from both metabolism of the food itself, as well as the inhibition of growth of other potentially pathogenic microbes. The antibacterial and antifungal activity of lactobacilli relies on production of bacteriocins and low molecular weight compounds that inhibit these microorganisms.

Sourdough bread is made either spontaneously, by taking advantage of the bacteria naturally present in flour, or by using a "starter culture", which is a symbiotic culture of yeast and lactic acid bacteria growing in a water and flour medium. The bacteria metabolize sugars into lactic acid, which lowers the pH of their environment and creates the signature sourness associated with yogurt, sauerkraut, etc.

In many traditional pickling processes, vegetables are submerged in brine, and salt-tolerant lactobacilli feed on natural sugars found in the vegetables. The resulting mix of salt and lactic acid is a hostile environment for other microbes, such as fungi, and the vegetables are thus preserved, remaining edible for long periods.

Lactobacilli, especially Pediococcus and L. brevis, are some of the most common beer spoilage organisms. They are, however, essential to the production of sour beers such as Belgian lambics and American wild ales, giving the beer a distinct tart flavor.

Scientist Elie Metchnikoff won a Nobel prize in 1908 for his work on LAB, the connection to food, and possible usage as a probiotic.

== See also ==
- Lactobacillus L. anticaries
- Lactic acid fermentation
- MRS agar
- Pediococcus
- Probiotics
- Proteobiotics
- Carbon monoxide-releasing molecules
