= Lactinex =

Supplement used to replace microorganisms in the human intestines and colon

Lactinex is a brand name for a probiotic supplement used to replace microorganisms (gut flora) in the human intestines and colon. The brand is a registered trademark of Becton, Dickinson and Company. It may be used to treat diarrhea resulting from infection or when an antibiotic regimen destroys harmful bacteria and beneficial gut flora alike.

The principal ingredient is one or more bacteria from the genus Lactobacillus regularly found in unpasteurized milk products (a blend of Lactobacillus acidophilus and Lactobacillus helveticus (bulgaricus)). It is considered a dietary supplement and is not a prescription. The brand Lactinex requires refrigeration because it contains live microorganisms. Similar ingredients are also found in freeze dried varieties that do not require refrigeration.
