= Lactobacillus porci =

Scientific classification
- Domain: Bacteria
- Kingdom: Bacillati
- Phylum: Bacillota
- Class: Bacilli
- Order: Lactobacillales
- Family: Lactobacillaceae
- Genus: Lactobacillus
- Species: L. porci

Binomial name
- Lactobacillus porci Kim JS, et al 2018

Species of bacterium

Lactobacillus porci is a species of bacteria of the genus Lactobacillus. Like other species in this genus, L. porci are gram-positive rods, non-spore forming and facultative anaerobic. L. porci is non-motile, and catalase negative.

== Characteristics ==
Lactobacillus porci was first discovered in the small intestine of a pig in South Korea. The type strain was suspended in a sodium chloride dilution, then cultivated on de Man, Rogosa, and Sharpe (MSR) agar and formed ivory-colored colonies under anaerobic conditions. The species resides in the guts of mammals and insects such as bumblebees.

Phylogenetic trees show that L. porci is closely related to strains and subspecies of L. delbrueckii.

== Biochemistry ==
L. porci can grow in anaerobic conditions and is capable of producing lactic acid from the fermentation of glucose.
