= List of microbiota species of the lower reproductive tract of women =

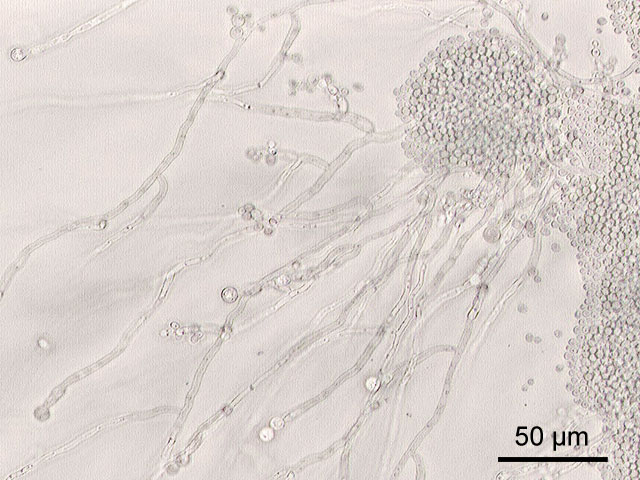
Candida albicans

This is the list of healthy vaginal microbiota (VMB), which is defined as the group of species and genera that generally are found to have lack of symptoms, absence of various infections, and result in good pregnancy outcomes. VMB is dominated mainly by Lactobacillus species. This is the list of organisms that are found in the lower reproductive tract of sexually mature women who are not immunocompromised. A partial description of pathogens that can be found in the lower and upper reproductive tract of women can be found in the article sexually transmitted infection. The organisms listed below are capable of causing illness if for some reason there is a change in vaginal pH or a change in the ratio of one organism to another. For example, Candida is a normal inhabitant of a healthy reproductive tract but an overgrowth of this organism can cause candidiasis.

== Normal microbiota ==
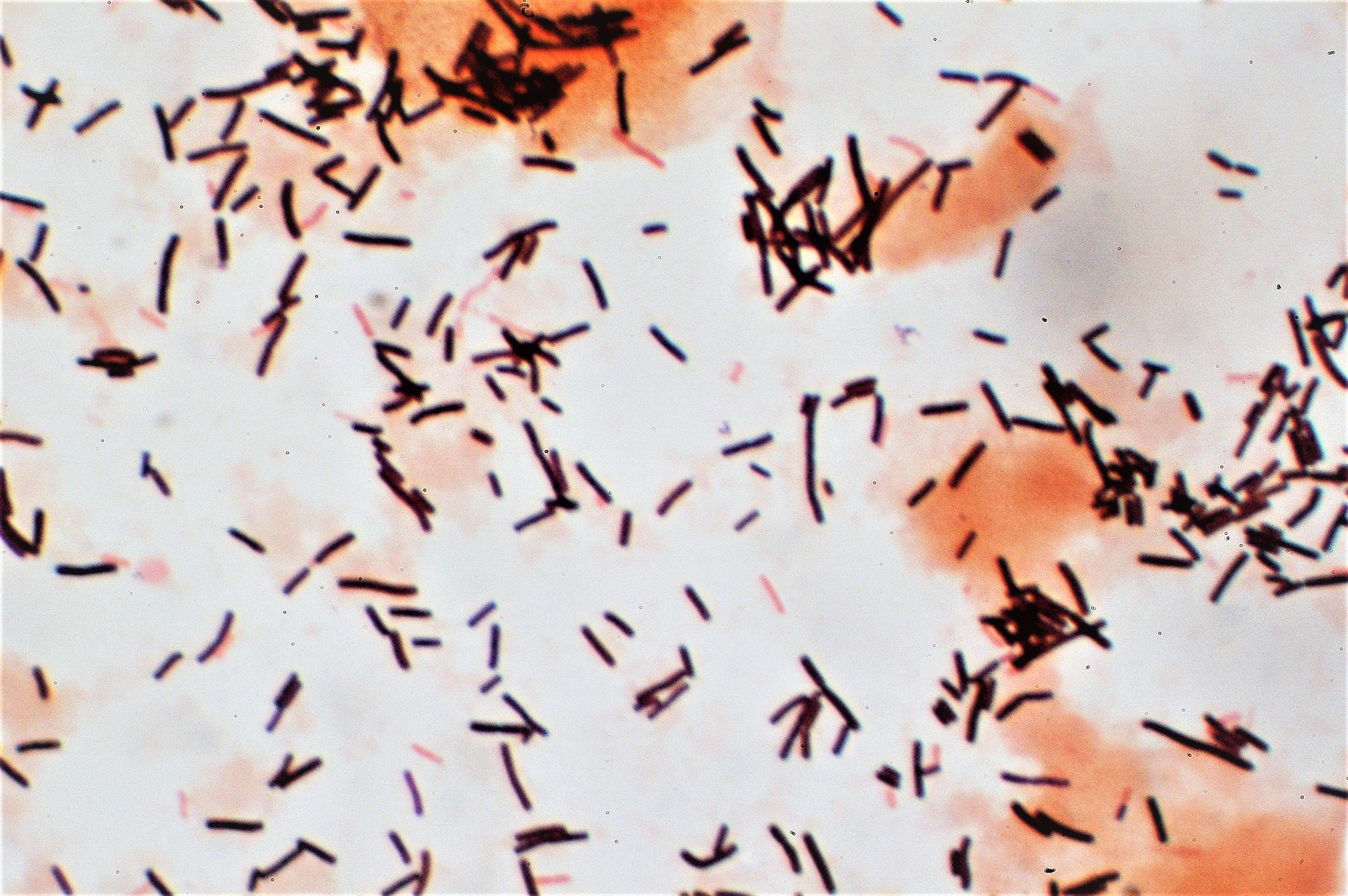
Gram stain of lactobacilli and squamous epithelial cells in vaginal swab

This is the list of the normal flora that are found in the lower reproductive tract of sexually mature women who exhibit no symptoms of illness and who are not immunocompromised. Lactobacilli predominate. These organisms protect against infection. Vaginal microbiota composition may have a genetic component.

=== Anaerobes ===
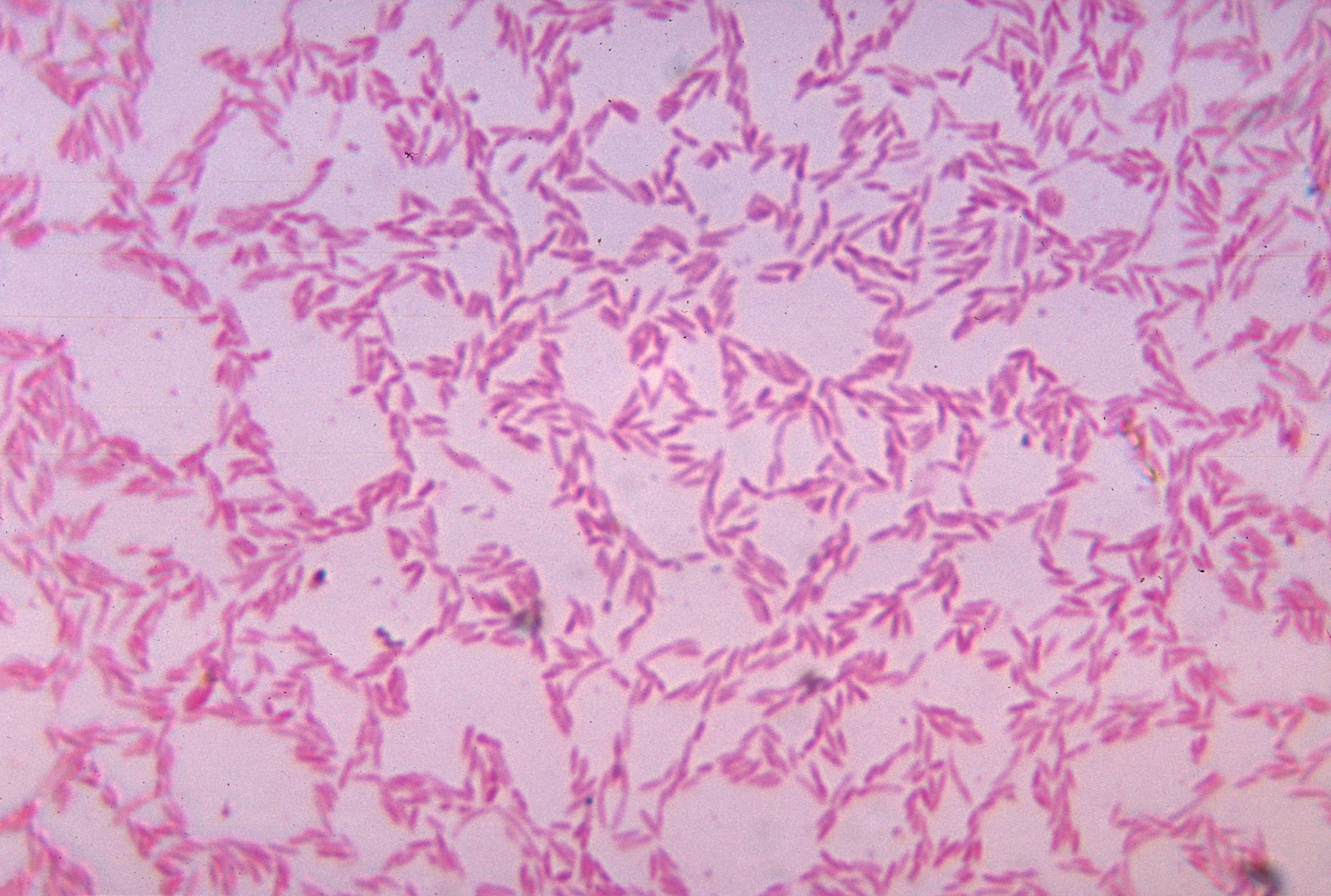
Bacteroides

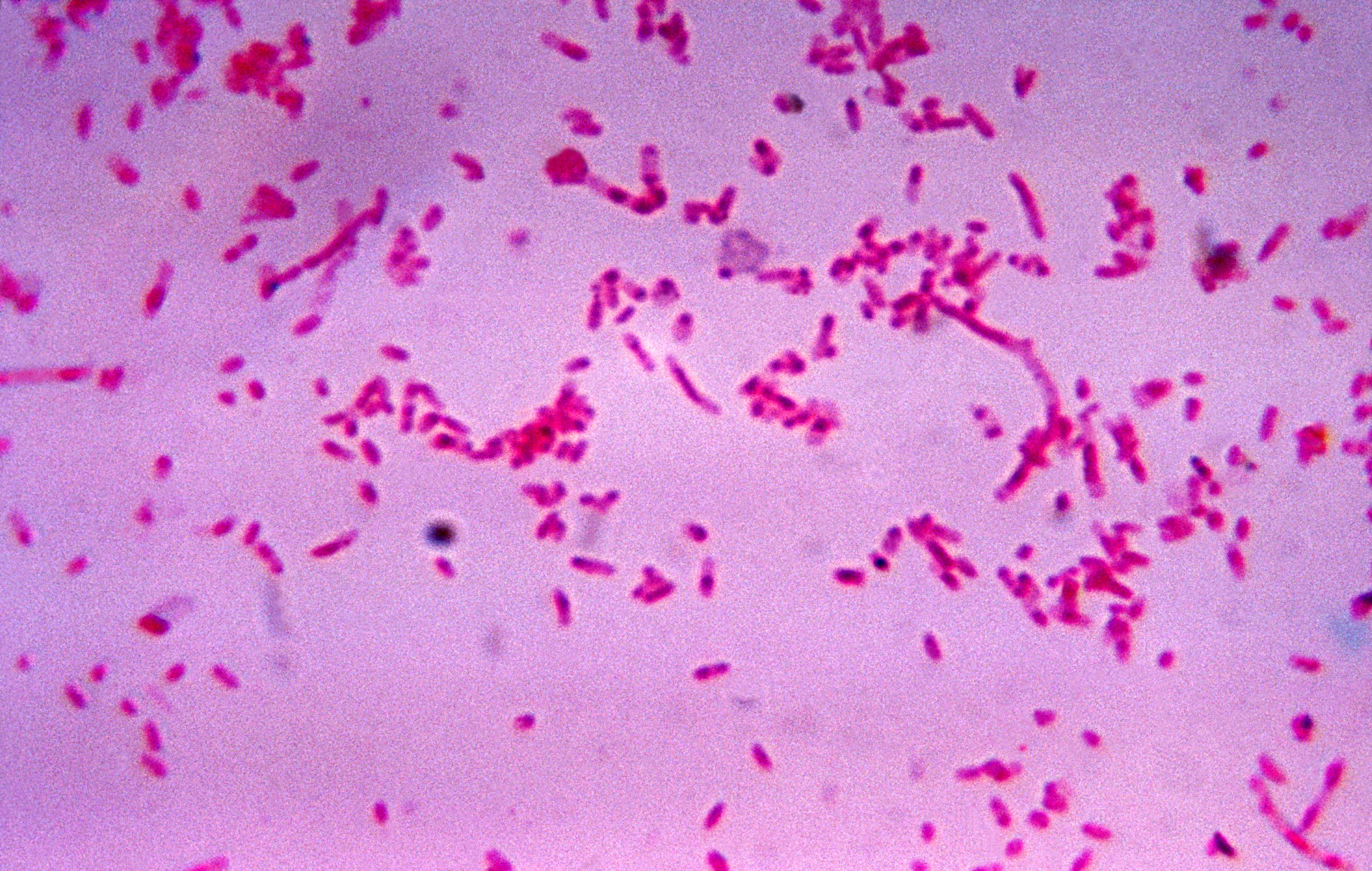
Fusobacterium

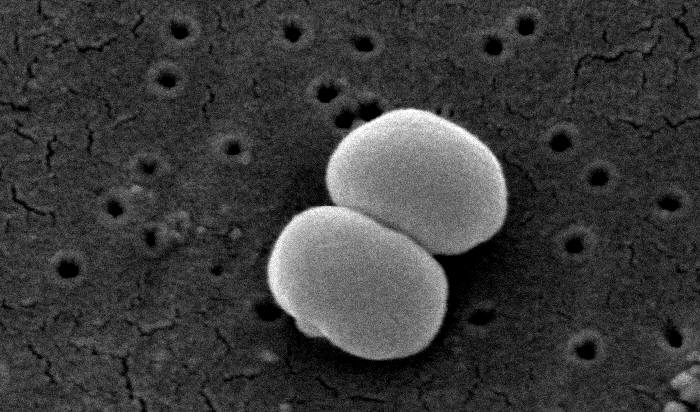
Staphylococcus epidermidis 01

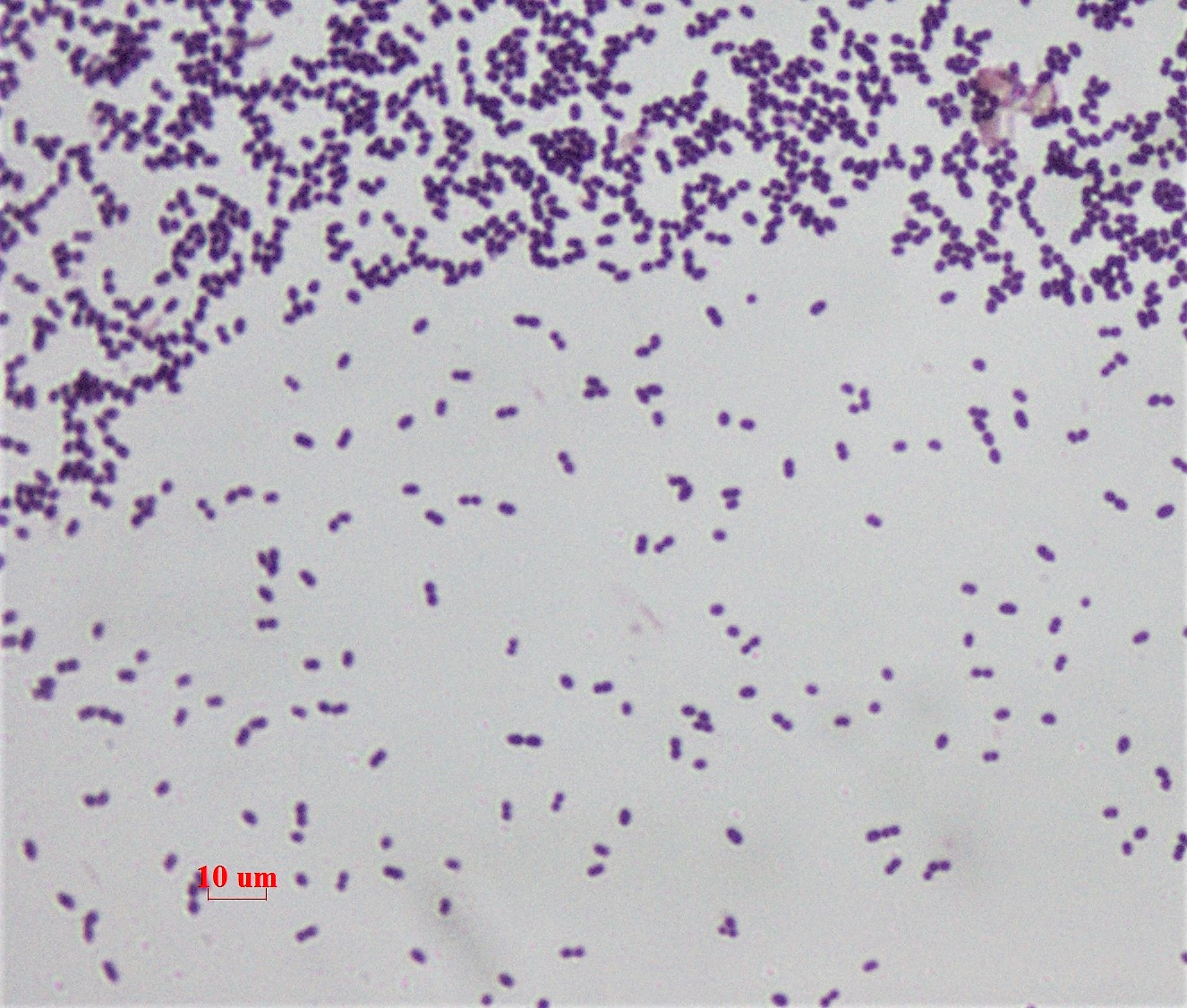
Enterococcus faecalis

Genus	species	Gram stain	form	genome sequenced	reference
Peptostreptococcus	spp.	+	cocci		
Clostridium	spp.	+	bacillus		
Lactobacillus	spp.	+	bacillus		
Lactobacillus	acidophilus	+	bacillus	X	
Lactobacillus	crispatus	+	bacillus		
Lactobacillus	johnsonii	+	bacillus	X	
Lactobacillus	sakei	+	bacillus	X	
Lactobacillus	bulgaris	+	bacillus	X	
Lactobacillus	jensenii	+	bacillus		
Lactobacillus	rhamnosus	+	bacillus		
Lactobacillus	reuteri	+	bacillus		
Lactobacillus	Lactobacillus casei var rhamnosus	+	bacillus		
Lactobacillus	gasseri	+	bacillus		
Lactobacillus	fermentum	+	bacillus		
Lactobacillus	iners	+	bacillus		
Lactobacillus	helveticus	+	bacillus		
Lactobacillus	leichmannii	+	bacillus		
Lactobacillus	brevis	+	bacillus		
Lactobacillus	plantarum	+	bacillus	X	
Lactobacillus	delbrueckii	+	bacillus		
Lactobacillus	vaginalis	+	bacillus		
Lactobacillus	salivarius	+	bacillus	X	
Lactobacillus	coleohominis	+	bacillus		
Lactobacillus	pentosus	+	bacillus		
Propionibacterium	spp.	+	bacillus		
Eubacterium	spp.	+	bacillus		
Bifidobacterium	spp.	+	bacillus		
Prevotella	spp.	-	bacillus		
Bacteroides	spp.	-	bacillus		
Bacteroides	fragilis	-	bacillus		
Fusobacterium	spp.	-	bacillus		
Veillonella	spp.	-	cocci		
Diphtheroids	spp.	+	bacillus		
Actinomycetales	spp.				

=== Aerobes ===
These bacteria may be detected as transients or are marginally discernable with PCR techniques. They are also opportunistic pathogens, and their overgrowth is considered an infection though symptoms and signs may be absent.

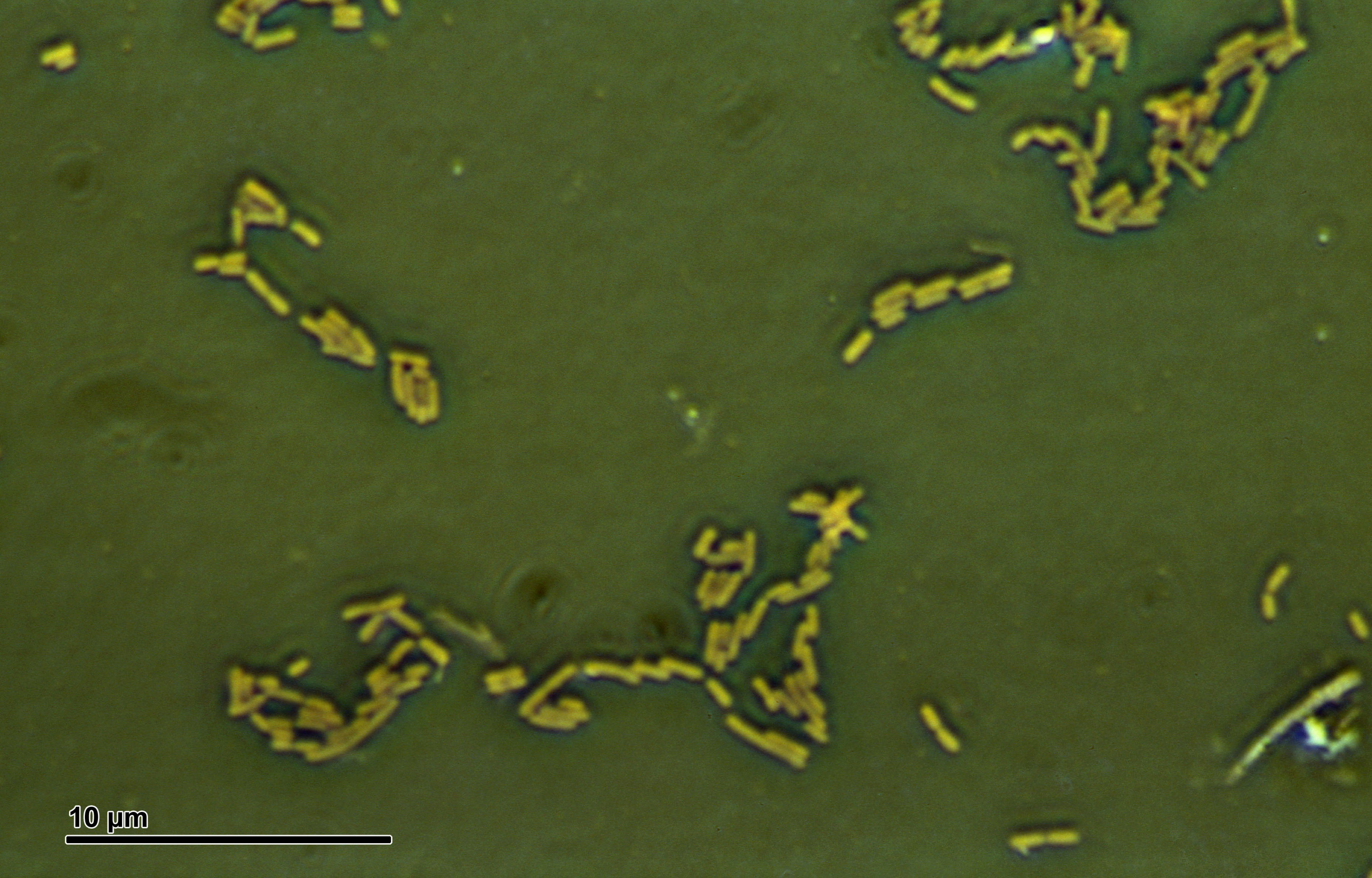
Escherichia coli (257 06) Gramnegative rods

Genus	species	Gram stain	form	reference
Staphylococcus	aureus	+	cocci	
Staphylococcus	epidermidis	+	cocci	
Group B Streptococcus	spp.	+	cocci	
Enterococcus faecalis	spp.	+	cocci	
Staphylococcus	spp.	+	cocci	
Actinomyces	israelii	+	bacillus	
Actinomyces	neuii	+	bacillus	
Escherichia	coli	-	bacillus	
Klebsiella	spp.	-	bacillus	
Proteus	spp.	-	bacillus	
Enterobacter	spp.	-	bacillus	
Acinetobacter	spp.	-	bacillus	
Citrobacter	spp.	-	bacillus	
Pseudomonas	spp.	-	bacillus	

While the vaginal microbiota is populated predominantly by Lactobacillus spp. in 71% of women, 29% of asymptomatic, healthy women possess a microbiota essentially lacking in Lactobacillus and instead the following groups have been isolated from this population. This microbiota is affiliated with ethnicity:

Genus	species	Gram stain	form	reference
Aerococcus	spp.		cocci	
Atopobium	spp.		bacillus	
Dialister	spp.		bacillus	
Eggerthella	spp.		bacillus	
Finegoldia	spp.			
Gardnerella	spp.		coccobacilli	
Megasphaera	spp.			
Mobiluncus	spp.		bacillus	
Peptoniphilus	spp.			
Prevotella	spp.			
Sneathia	spp.			

== Yeast ==
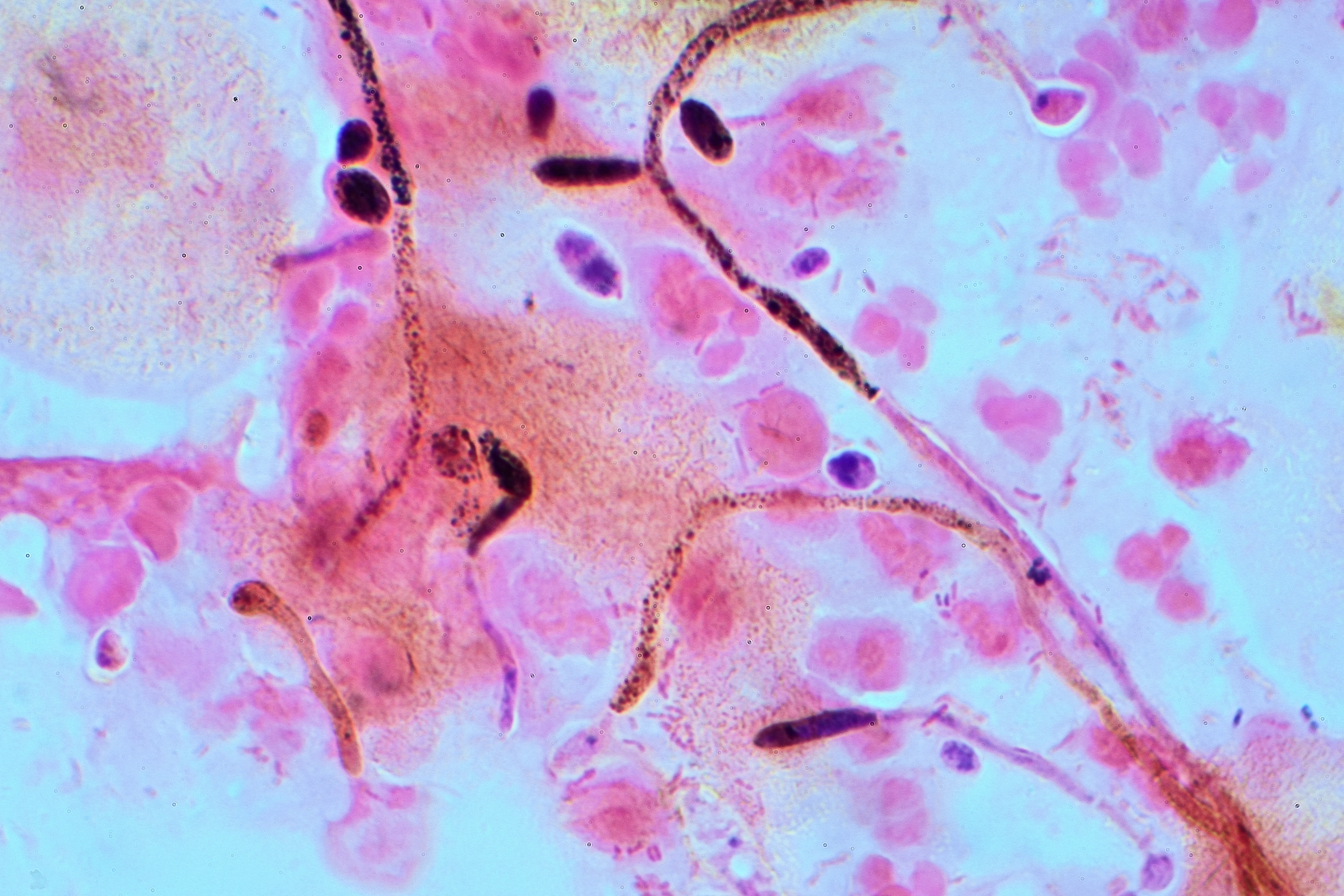
Candida albicans (Gram stain)

Candida albicans and other spp.

== Microbiota changes ==
Pre-pubescent girls, women in menarche, and postmenopausal women have lower populations of Lactobacillus spp. in proportion to the other species. Hormone replacement therapy in postmenopausal women restores the microbiota to that of a reproductive-aged woman. The microbiota populations change in response to the menstrual cycle. Pregnancy alters the microbiota, with a reduction in species/genus diversity. Overgrowth of Candida albicans or other Candida (yeast infections) sometimes occurs after antibiotic therapy. Bacterial vaginosis results in altered populations and ratios of the normal microbiota. There has been no link demonstrated between taking oral probiotics and maintaining normal microbiota populations of lactobacilli.
