= Lentilactobacillus kefiri =

Scientific classification
- Domain: Bacteria
- Kingdom: Bacillati
- Phylum: Bacillota
- Class: Bacilli
- Order: Lactobacillales
- Family: Lactobacillaceae
- Genus: Lentilactobacillus
- Species: L. kefiri

Binomial name
- Lentilactobacillus kefiri (Kandler and Kunath 1983) Zheng et al. 2020

Bacteria species

Lentilactobacillus kefiri is species of rod-shaped nonmotile bacteria. It is one of the main lactic acid bacteria species found in kefir and kefir grains. It can be bought and used as a probiotic.

Colonies on MRS agar are grayish, smooth, flat and 2 to 4mm in diameter. It is obligately heterofermentive, and can ferment lactose, maltose, melibiose, ribose, as well as sucrose, mannitol and trehalose to a weaker extent. It is not known to be pathogenic.
