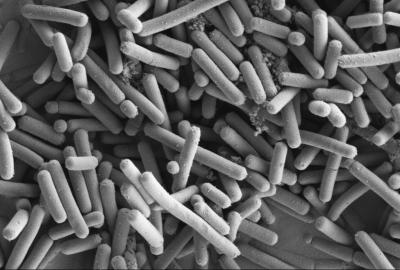

Scientific classification
- Domain: Bacteria
- Kingdom: Bacillati
- Phylum: Bacillota
- Class: Bacilli
- Order: Lactobacillales
- Family: Lactobacillaceae
- Genus: Lactobacillus
- Species: L. johnsonii

Binomial name
- Lactobacillus johnsonii Fujisawa et al., 1992

= Lactobacillus johnsonii =

Species of bacterium

Lactobacillus johnsonii is a species in the genus Lactobacillus identified in 1980 by John L. Johnson, an American microbiologist and his associates. Its type strain is ATCC 33200. It is part of the healthy vaginal microbiota and has been identified as having probiotic properties. The L. johnsonii strain La1 was one of the first cultures to be proposed as a probiotic dairy supplement in 1995 at the Nestlé Research Center, Lausanne. Although yeast and bacteria have been used in dairy products for fermenting purposes for centuries, the investigation and choice of a microorganism as a fermenting agent based on its health benefits was novel at the time. Today the probiotic culture is used in the LC1 yogurt products by Nestlé.
