= Lactobacillus kefiranofaciens =

Scientific classification
- Domain: Bacteria
- Kingdom: Bacillati
- Phylum: Bacillota
- Class: Bacilli
- Order: Lactobacillales
- Family: Lactobacillaceae
- Genus: Lactobacillus
- Species: L. kefiranofaciens

Binomial name
- Lactobacillus kefiranofaciens Fujisawa et al. 1988

Subspecies
- subsp. kefirgranum (Takizawa et al. 1994) Vancanneyt et al. 2004; subsp. kefiranofaciens (Fujisawa et al. 1988) Vancanneyt et al. 2004

Synonyms
- Lactobacillus kefirgranum Takizawa et al. 1994

Species of bacterium

Lactobacillus kefiranofaciens is a species of slime-forming, homofermentative, rod-shaped lactic acid bacteria first isolated from kefir grains, hence its name. Its type strain is WT-2B (ATCC 43761). Its genome has been sequenced. Lactobaccillus kefiranofaciens was first identified in 1967 in Russia through studying kefir granules. Lactobaccillus kefiranofaciens is part of the Lactobacillus genus and Firmicutes phylum of bacteria. These bacterium metabolize carbohydrates and produce lactic acid, which can be useful in fermentation. Two subspecies have been identified as kefirgranum and kefiranofaciens, which share properties such as being gram-positive, facultatively anaerobic, and rod-shaped. L. kefiranofaciens is the subspecies related to kefir granules. Studies have investigated the origins and causes for variation in kefir composition and led to conflicting results. Some studies indicate the presence of L. kefiranofaciens was due to geographical location, while others indicate it was due to the different milks used.

== Contribution to kefir and other fermented products ==
L. kefiranofaciens produces kefiran, an extracellular polysaccharide that helps in creating a biofilm, or kefir granule. When combined with milk, kefir granules help produce the drink kefir. Kefir is a probiotic drink containing lactic and acetic acid bacteria as well as yeasts and is commonly known to help with intestinal health. Due to its diverse microbial composition, evidence indicates kefir could have numerous additional health benefits including regulating blood lipid levels and high blood pressure along with antimicrobial properties. L. kefiranofaciens is often included in starters for food/drink fermentation. There is no evidence of pathogenicity nor toxicity from kefir, leading to L. kefiranofaciens being widely regarded as a safe for ingestion and assisting in fermentation.

== Possible future applications ==
Evidence from a mice study indicates that through the gut microbiome's relationship to brain function, L. kefiranofaciens consumption could help improve symptoms related to depression. Continued research on Lactobacillus kefiranofaciens could lead to new approaches on depression treatment.
