= Lactobacillus gallinarum =

Scientific classification
- Domain: Bacteria
- Kingdom: Bacillati
- Phylum: Bacillota
- Class: Bacilli
- Order: Lactobacillales
- Family: Lactobacillaceae
- Genus: Lactobacillus
- Species: L. gallinarum

Binomial name
- Lactobacillus gallinarum Fujisawa et al., 1992

Species of bacterium

Lactobacillus gallinarum is a species in the genus Lactobacillus. Its type strain is ATCC 33199.

L. gallinarum is a native probiotic to chickens. L. gallinarum adheres to the epithelial cells of the crop, ileum, and ceca of broilers. L. gallinarum is most persistent in the ileum and ceca due to its sensitivity to bile. Along with L. gallinarum, L. acidophilus, L. salivarius, L. fermentum, and L. reuteri, are found in high abundance in the ileum and crop of chickens.

Lactobacillus gallinarum is a novel species of Lactobacillus, originally isolated from the crop of chickens. Though closely related to other Lactobacillus species, L. gallinarum has evolved specifically to adhere to poultry epithelial lining, and is able to adhere to the chicken hepatoma cell line (LMH).

Lactobacillus acts as a competitive inhibitor, preventing pathogens from colonizing the gastrointestinal tract. L. gallinarum, along with other Lactobacillus species, was found to reduce Salmonella in the ceca of broilers. Salmonella free broilers were fed a Lactobacillus multi-species probiotic containing L. gallinarum. Twenty days after infection with Salmonella Enteritidis, there was significant reduction of the Salmonella in the ceca of probiotic fed chickens.
