= Lentilactobacillus parakefiri =

Scientific classification
- Domain: Bacteria
- Kingdom: Bacillati
- Phylum: Bacillota
- Class: Bacilli
- Order: Lactobacillales
- Family: Lactobacillaceae
- Genus: Lentilactobacillus
- Species: L. parakefiri

Binomial name
- Lentilactobacillus parakefiri (Takizawa et al. 1994) Zheng et al. 2020

Synonyms
- Lactobacillus parakefiri corrig. Takizawa et al. 1994; Lactobacillus parakefir Takizawa et al. 1994

Species of bacterium

Lentilactobacillus parakefiri is a species in the genus Lentilactobacillus first isolated from kefir grains, hence its name. Its type strain is GCL 1731 (= JCM 8573).
