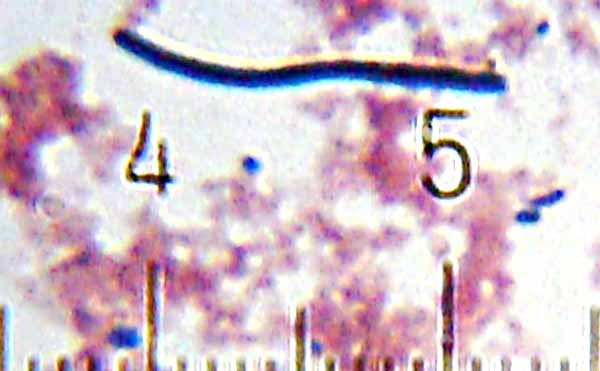
- Lactobacillus delbrueckii subspecies bulgaricus from a sample of Activia brand yogurt

Scientific classification
- Domain: Bacteria
- Kingdom: Bacillati
- Phylum: Bacillota
- Class: Bacilli
- Order: Lactobacillales
- Family: Lactobacillaceae
- Genus: Lactobacillus
- Species: L. delbrueckii

Binomial name
- Lactobacillus delbrueckii Beijerinck 1901 (Approved Lists 1980)

Subspecies
- subsp. bulgaricus (Orla-Jensen 1919) Weiss et al. 1984; subsp. delbrueckii (Leichmann 1896) Weiss et al. 1984; subsp. indicus Dellaglio et al. 2005; subsp. jakobsenii Adimpong et al. 2013; subsp. lactis (Orla-Jensen 1919) Weiss et al. 1984; subsp. sunkii Kudo et al. 2012

Synonyms
- "Bacillus delbruecki" Leichmann 1896; "Bacillus leichmanni" Henneberg 1903; Lactobacillus bulgaricus (Orla-Jensen 1919) Rogosa and Hansen 1971 (Approved Lists 1980); Lactobacillus lactis (Orla-Jensen 1919) Bergey et al. 1934 (Approved Lists 1980); Lactobacillus leichmannii (Henneberg 1903) Bergey et al. 1923 (Approved Lists 1980); "Thermobacterium bulgaricum" Orla-Jensen 1919; "Thermobacterium lactis" Orla-Jensen 1919

= Lactobacillus delbrueckii =

Species of bacterium

Lactobacillus delbrueckii is a species of bacteria in the family Lactobacillaceae. It is part of the microbiota of the lower reproductive tract of women.

== History ==
=== Naming ===
The species carries the name of Max Delbrück, who lent his name to the Berlin Institute for the Fermentation Industries, where L. delbrueckii and L. delbrueckii subsp. bulgaricus were produced on an industrial scale from about 1896. (Delbrück's Institute was located in East Berlin and around 1967 it was renamed Institut für Gärungsgewerbe und Biotechnologie zu Berlin (IFGB).)

=== Subspecies ===
A paper published in 1983 by Weiss, Schillinger, and Kandler, described the high degree of shared identity between L. delbrueckii 's subspecies, which had previously been considered separate species.
