= Dellaglioa =

Scientific classification
- Domain: Bacteria
- Kingdom: Bacillati
- Phylum: Bacillota
- Class: Bacilli
- Order: Lactobacillales
- Family: Lactobacillaceae
- Genus: Dellaglioa; Zheng, et al. 2020

Species
- D. algida D. carnosa D. kimchii

Genus of bacteria

Dellaglioa is a genus of lactic acid bacteria, it was split from Lactobacillus 2020 and was named after the Italian microbiologist Franco Dellaglio. The type species is Dellaglioa algida.
