= Kefir =

Fermented milk drink made from kefir grains

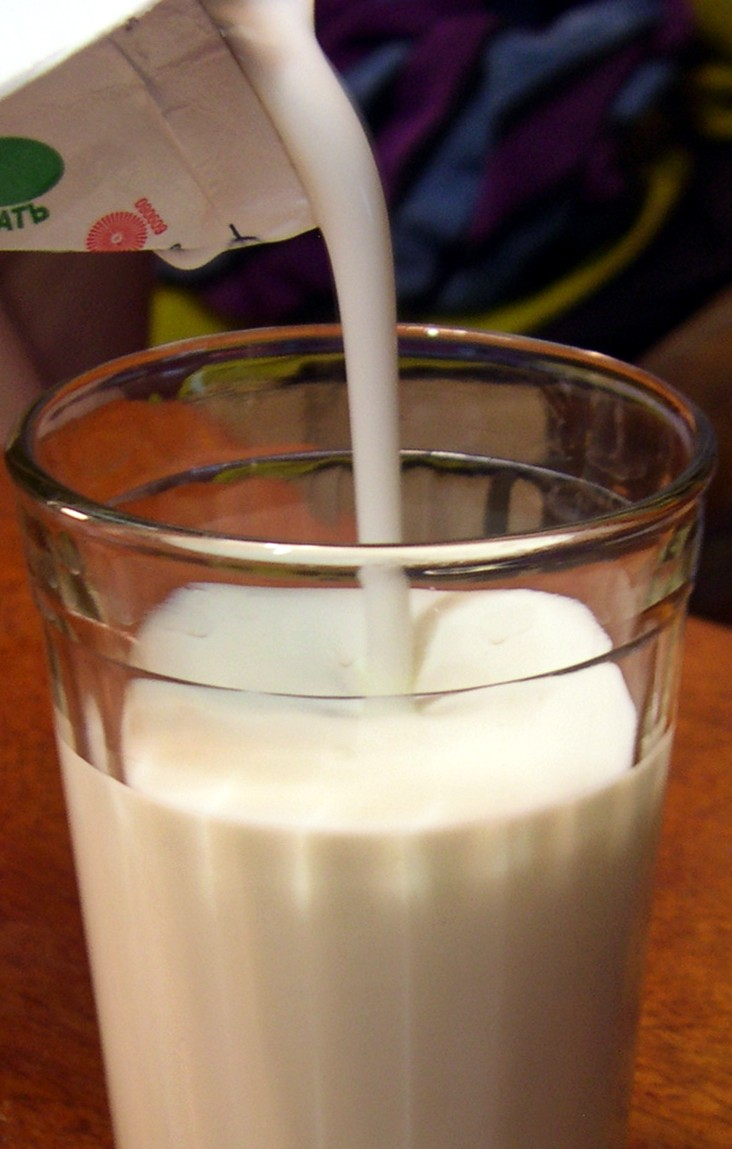
- Plain milk kefir being poured
- Alternative names: Milk kefir, gıpı ayran, qundəps, búlgaros
- Main ingredients: Milk and kefir grains

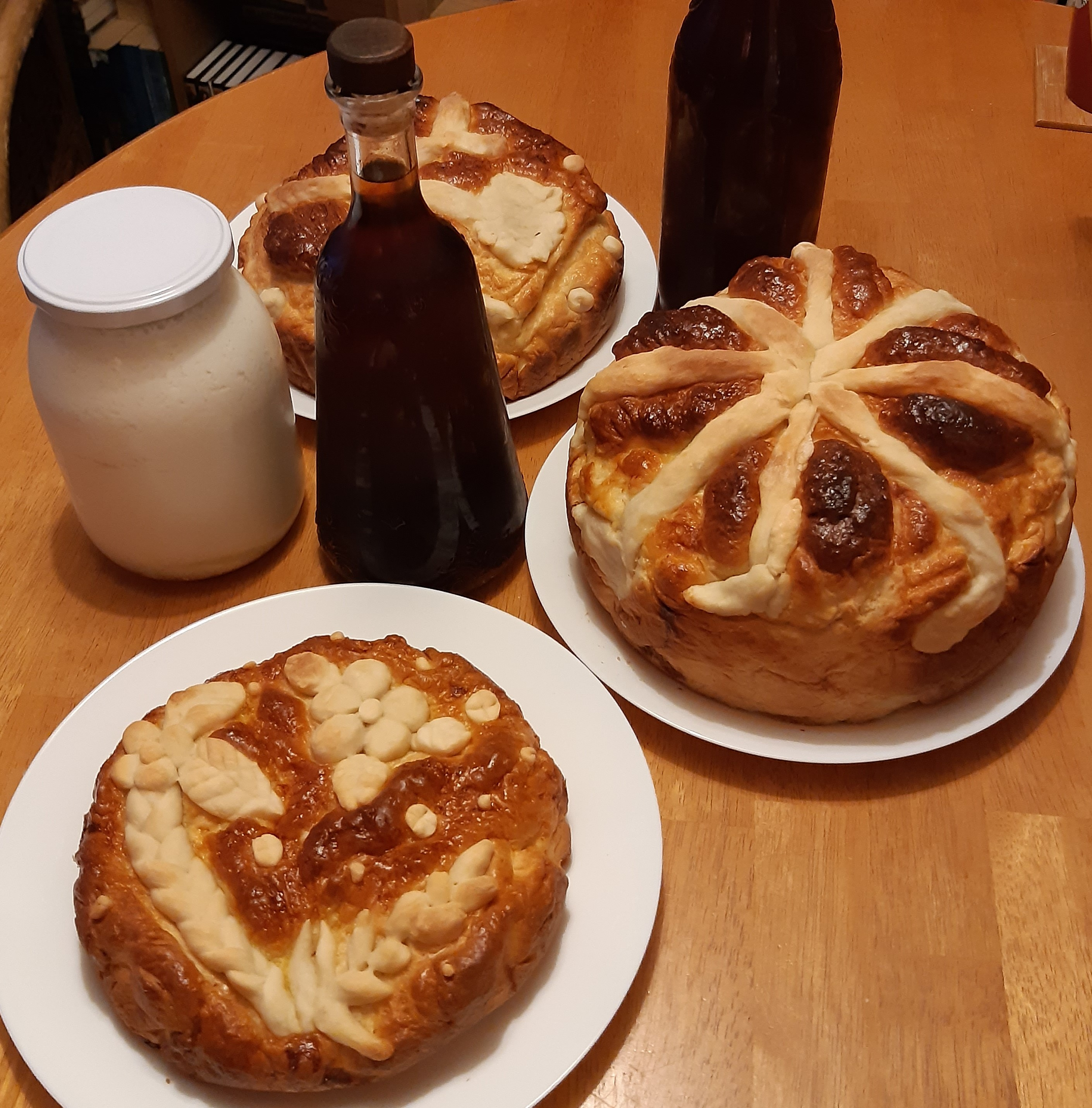
Homemade kefir and kvass served alongside kolach and korovai

Kefir (/kəˈfɪər/ kə-FEER; alternative spellings: kephir or kefier (Note: Adyghe: Къундэпс: Adyghe pronunciation: [qʷunˈdəps]; Armenian: Կեֆիր Armenian pronunciation: [ˈkɛfir]; Georgian: კეფირი Georgian pronunciation: [ˈkʼɛpʰiri]; Karachay-Balkar: гыпы)) is a fermented milk drink similar to a thin yogurt or ayran that is made from kefir grains, a specific type of mesophilic symbiotic culture. It is prepared by inoculating the milk of cows, goats, or sheep with kefir grains.

Kefir is a common breakfast, lunch or dinner drink consumed in countries of West Asia and Central and Eastern Europe. Kefir is consumed at any time of the day, alongside Central Asian breads like shelpek (Kazakh bread), burek and banitsa/gibanica, and is an ingredient in cold soups.

== Origin and etymology ==
Kefir has been found in graves in the Bronze Age Xiaohe Cemetery, dating back 3,600 years.

The word kefir is of North Caucasian origin, where related words are attested in several languages: Mingrelian ქიფური (kipuri), Karachay-Balkar гыпы (gıpı) and Ossetian къӕпы (k'æpy). One theory is that the word comes from Old Turkic köpür '(milk) froth'. It was loaned into Russian where it is attested since 1870s, and from there it was loaned into English, there attested in 1880s. It has become an internationalism, as it is found in many European languages.

Kefir is a very popular drink in the North Caucasus, it is a part of traditional Circassian cuisine to this day. Traditional kefir was made in goatskin bags that were hung near a doorway; the bags would be knocked by anyone passing through to keep the milk and kefir grains well mixed. In Karachay-Balkar, gıpı has a connection with gıpıt (wineskin). It was under the name wineskin that Karachay kefir was distributed in the second half of the 19th century and at the beginning of the 20th century. Kefir spread from the former Soviet Union to the rest of Europe, Canada, Japan, and the United States by the early 21st century.

== Fermentation and kefir grain formation ==
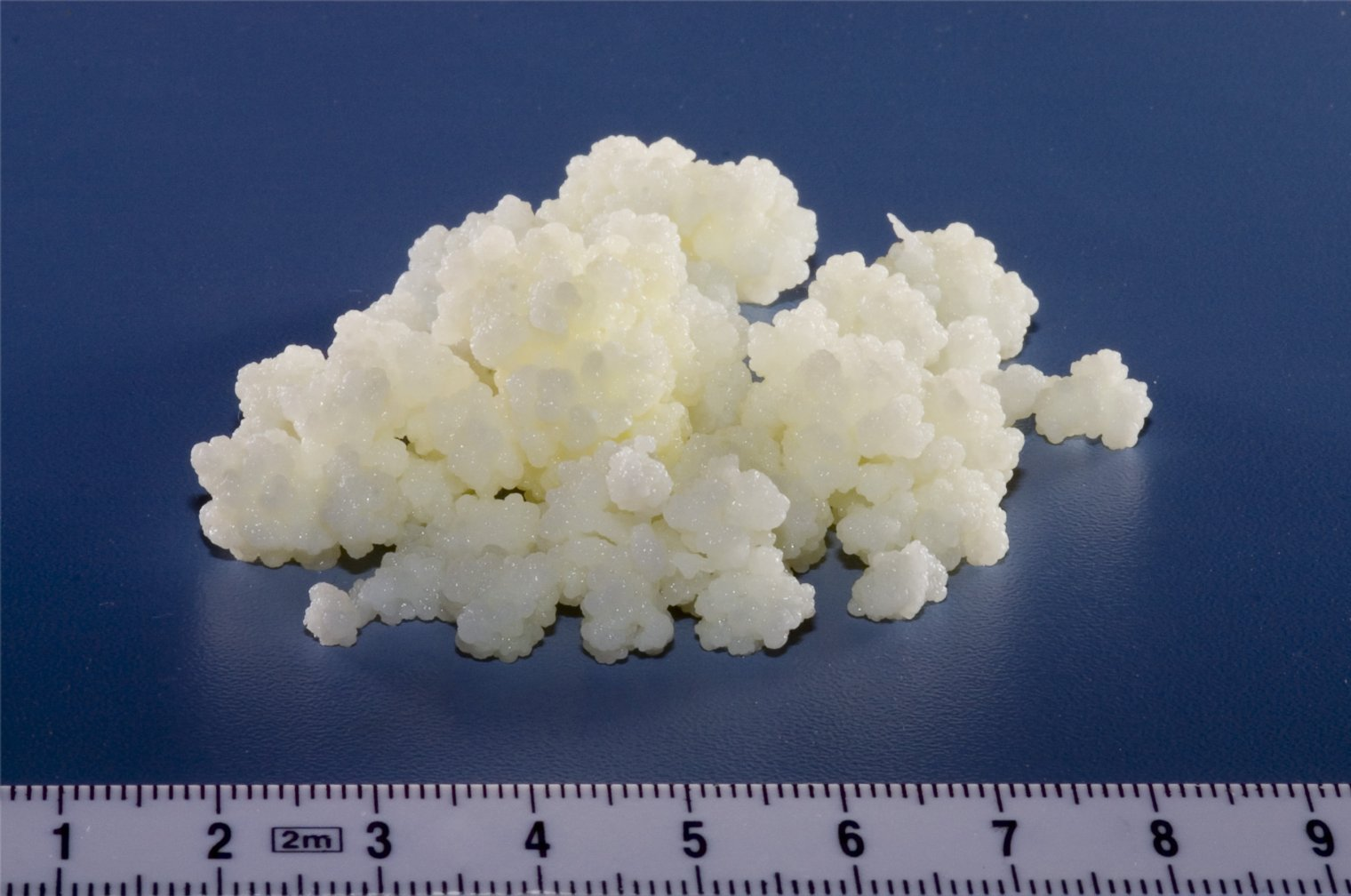
Kefir grains, a matrix of bacteria and yeasts

Traditional kefir is fermented at ambient temperatures, generally overnight. Fermentation of the lactose yields a sour, carbonated, slightly alcoholic beverage, with a consistency and taste similar to drinkable yogurt.

The kefir grains initiating the fermentation are initially created by auto-aggregations of Lactobacillus kefiranofaciens and Maudiozyma turicensis or M. humilis, where multiple biofilm producers cause the surfaces to adhere which form a three dimensional microcolony. The biofilm is a matrix of heteropolysaccharides called kefiran, which is composed of equal proportions of glucose and galactose. It resembles small cauliflower grains, with color ranging from white to creamy yellow. A complex and highly variable symbiotic community can be found in these grains, which can include acetic acid bacteria (such as Acetobacter aceti and Acetobacter rasens), yeasts (such as Kluyveromyces lactis, K. marxianus, Saccharomyces cerevisiae, M. turicensis) and a number of Lactobacillus species, such as L. parakefiri, L. kefiranofaciens (and subsp. kefirgranum), L. kefiri, L. brevis, etc. While some microbes predominate, Lactobacillus species are always present. The microbe flora can vary between batches of kefir due to factors such as the kefir grains rising out of the milk while fermenting or curds forming around the grains, as well as temperature. Additionally, Tibetan kefir composition differs from that of the Russian kefir, Irish kefir, Taiwan kefir and Turkey fermented beverage with kefir. In recent years, the use of freeze-dried starter culture has become common due to stability of the fermentation result, because the species of microbes are selected in laboratory conditions, as well as easy transportation.

During fermentation, changes in the composition of ingredients occur. Lactose, the sugar present in milk, is broken down mostly to lactic acid by the lactic acid bacteria, which results in acidification. Propionibacteria further break down some of the lactic acid into propionic acid (these bacteria also carry out the same fermentation in Swiss cheese). Other substances that contribute to the flavor of kefir are pyruvic acid, acetic acid, diacetyl and acetoin (both of which contribute a "buttery" flavor), citric acid, acetaldehyde, and amino acids resulting from protein breakdown.

=== Decreased lactose content ===
During the fermentation process, bacteria and yeast break lactose down into glucose and galactose. As a result of the fermentation, lactose levels are decreased by 20–30% with respect to the initial lactose levels present in the milk. One study found that when people with lactose intolerance consumed the same amount of lactose in milk, kefir or yogurt products, the latter two showed significantly reduced symptoms of lactose intolerance during the first 8 hours after consumption. This result suggests that yogurt and kefir might be suitable for people with lactose intolerance. However, the long-term impact of kefir consumption on lactose intolerance has not been studied. It has also been shown that fermented milk products have a slower transit time than milk, which may further improve lactose digestion.

=== Alcohol content ===
Kefir contains a small amount of ethanol. The level of ethanol in kefir can vary by production method. A 2016 study of kefir sold in Germany showed an ethanol level of only 0.02 g per litre, which was attributed to fermentation under controlled conditions allowing the growth of Lactobacteria only, but excluding the growth of other microorganisms that generate much higher amounts of ethanol. A 2008 study of German commercial kefir found levels of 0.002–0.005% of ethanol. Kefir produced by small-scale dairies in Russia in the early 20th century had 1–2% ethanol, but this is no longer common.

Kefir, plain
Nutritional value per 100 g (3.5 oz)
- Energy: 52 kcal (220 kJ)
- Carbohydrates: 7.48 g
- Sugars: 6.91 g
- Dietary fiber: 0 g
- Fat: 0.96 g
- Protein: 3.56 g
Vitamins and minerals
Vitamins	Quantity %DV^{†}
Vitamin A equiv.	19% 174 μg
Thiamine (B1)	3% 0.03 mg
Riboflavin (B2)	13% 0.172 mg
Niacin (B3)	1% 0.128 mg
Vitamin B6	3% 0.059 mg
Folate (B9)	5% 18 μg
Vitamin B12	13% 0.3 μg
Vitamin C	1% 0.8 mg
Vitamin K	1% 0.6 μg
Minerals	Quantity %DV^{†}
Calcium	10% 124 mg
Iron	0% 0.04 mg
Magnesium	3% 12 mg
Phosphorus	8% 100 mg
Potassium	5% 159 mg
Sodium	2% 38 mg
Zinc	4% 0.45 mg
- Other constituents: Quantity
- Water: 87 g
- Link to Full Report from USDA FoodData Central
- ^{†}Percentages estimated using US recommendations for adults, except for potassium, which is estimated based on expert recommendation from the National Academies.

== Nutrition ==
Plain kefir is 87% water, 7% carbohydrates, 4% protein, and 1% fat (table). In a reference amount of 100 g (3.5 oz), kefir provides 52 calories of food energy, and contains moderate amounts (10-19% of the Daily Value, DV) of vitamin A, vitamin B_{12}, riboflavin, and calcium (table).

Kefir contains byproducts of the fermentation process, including carbon dioxide and ethanol.

=== Microbiota ===
Probiotic bacteria found in kefir products include Lactobacillus acidophilus, Bifidobacterium bifidum, Streptococcus thermophilus, Lactobacillus delbrueckii subsp. bulgaricus, Lactobacillus helveticus, Lactobacillus kefiranofaciens, Lactococcus lactis, and Leuconostoc species. Lactobacilli in kefir may exist in concentrations varying from approximately 1 million to 1 billion colony-forming units per milliliter, and are the bacteria responsible for the synthesis of the polysaccharide kefiran.

In addition to bacteria, kefir often contains strains of yeast that can metabolize lactose, such as Kluyveromyces marxianus, Kluyveromyces lactis, and Saccharomyces fragilis, as well as strains of yeast that do not metabolize lactose, including Saccharomyces cerevisiae, Torulaspora delbrueckii, and Kazachstania unispora. The nutritional significance of these strains is not currently known with certainty.

== Production ==
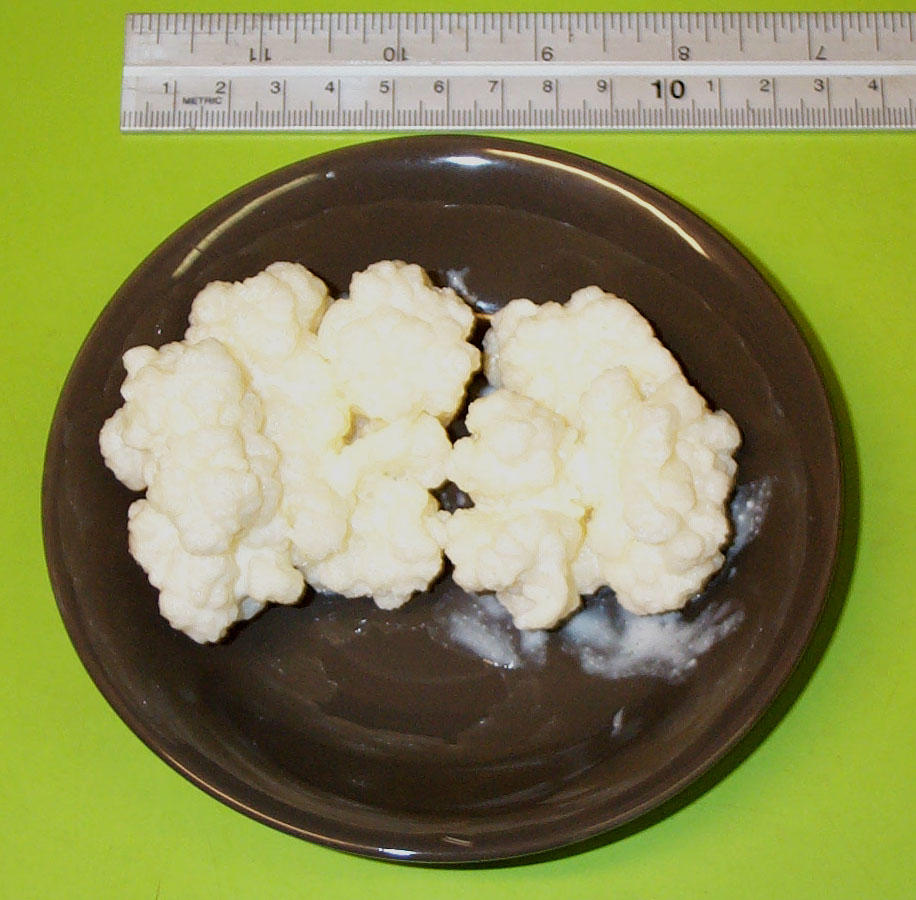
90 grams of kefir grains

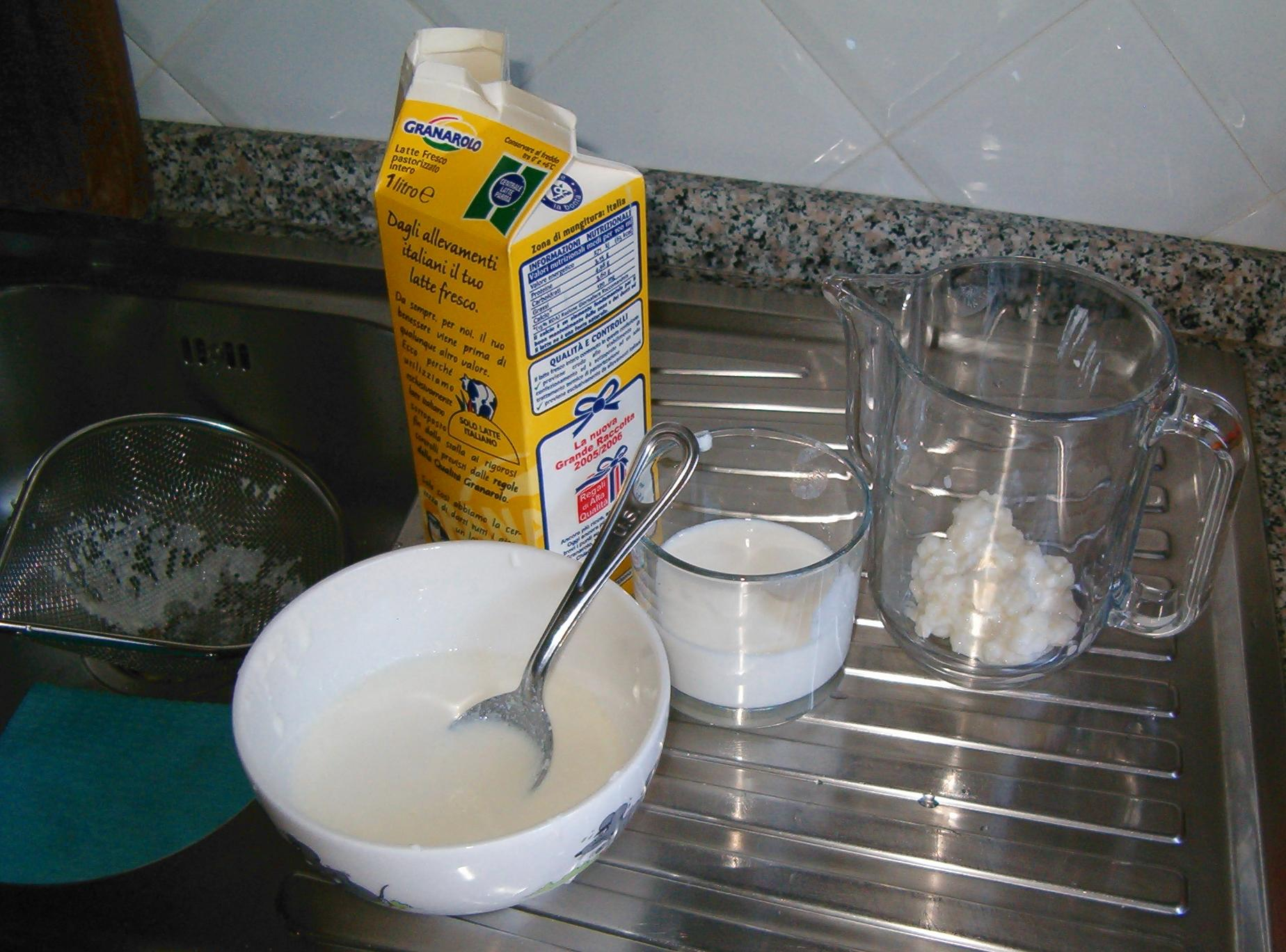
Kefir production

Modern kefir is made by adding kefir grains to milk typically at a proportion of 2–5% grains-to-milk. The mixture is then placed in a corrosion-resistant container, such as a glass jar, and stored preferably in the dark to prevent degradation of light-sensitive vitamins. After a period between 12 and 24 hours of fermentation at mild temperature, ideally 20–25 °C (68–77 °F), the grains are strained from the milk using a corrosion-resistant (stainless steel or plastic) utensil and kept to produce another batch. During the fermentation process the grains enlarge and eventually split forming new units.

The resulting fermented liquid may be drunk, used in recipes, or kept aside in a sealed container for additional time to undergo a secondary fermentation. Because of its acidity the beverage should not be stored in reactive metal containers such as aluminium, copper, or zinc, as these may leach into it over time. The shelf life, unrefrigerated, is up to thirty days.

The Russian method permits production of kefir on a larger scale and uses two fermentations. The first step is to prepare the cultures by inoculating milk with 2–3% grains as described. The grains are then removed by filtration and 1–3% of the resulting liquid mother culture is added to milk and fermented for 12 to 18 hours.

Kefir can be made using freeze-dried cultures commonly available in powder form from health food stores. A portion of the resulting kefir can be saved to be used a number of times to propagate further fermentations but ultimately does not form grains.

In Taiwan, researchers were able to produce kefir in a laboratory using microorganisms isolated from kefir grains. They report that the resulting kefir drink had chemical properties similar to homemade kefir.

== Milk types ==
Kefir grains will ferment the milk from most mammals and will continue to grow in such milk. Typical animal milks used include cow, goat, and sheep, each with varying organoleptic (flavor, aroma, and texture) and nutritional qualities. Raw milk has been traditionally used.

Milk sugar is not essential for the synthesis of the polysaccharide that makes up the grains (kefiran), and rice hydrolysate is a suitable alternative medium. Additionally, kefir grains will reproduce when fermenting soy milk, although they will change in appearance and size due to the differing proteins available to them.

A different type of SCOBY that thrives in sugary water also exists, called water kefir (or tibicos), and can vary markedly from milk kefir in both appearance and microbial composition.

== Culinary ==
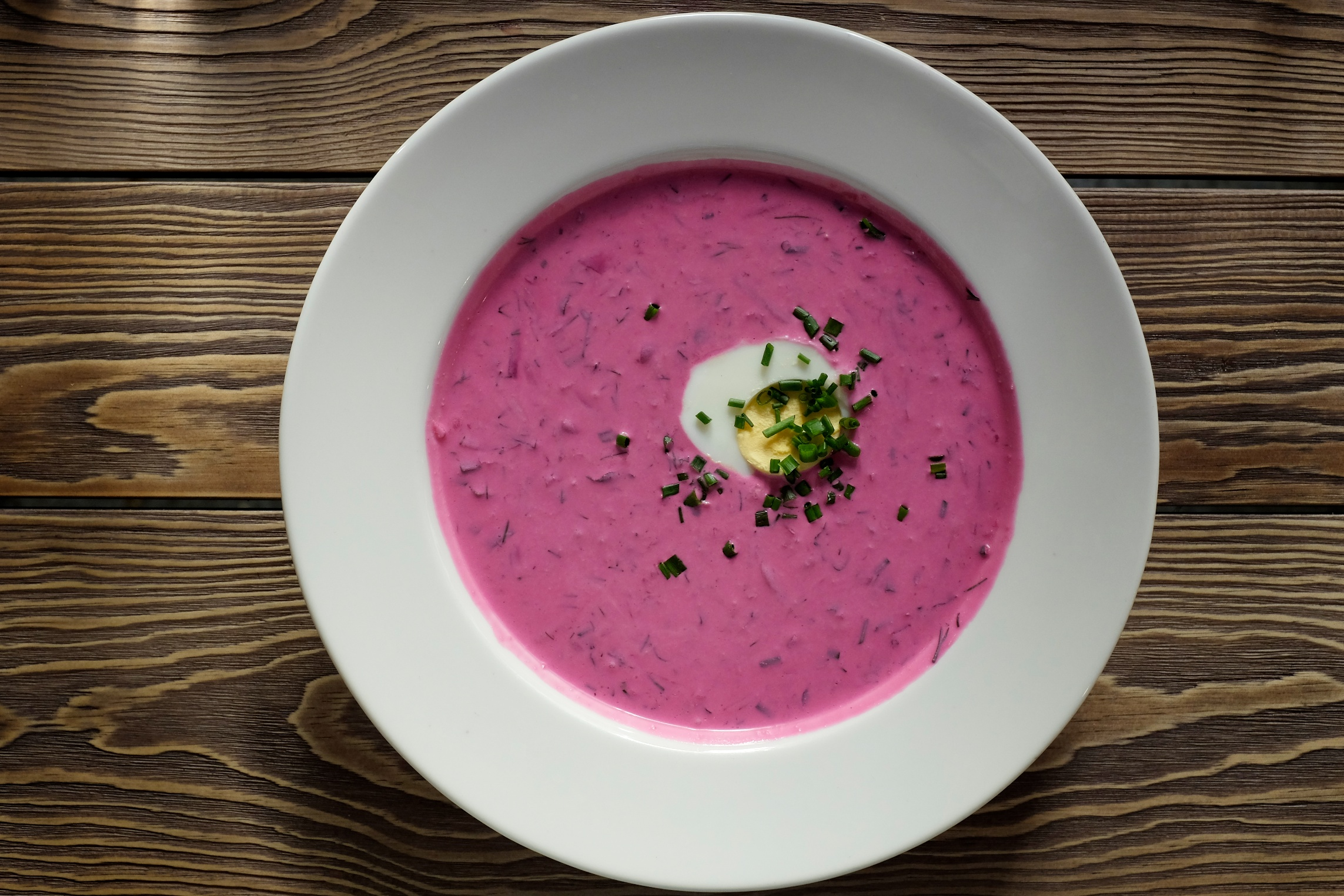
The Lithuanian soup šaltibarščiai, also known as "cold borscht", consumed in Eastern European countries

As it contains Lactobacillus bacteria, kefir can be used to make a sourdough starter. It is also useful as a buttermilk substitute in baking. Kefir is one of the main ingredients in cold borscht soup in Lithuania, also known in Poland as Lithuanian cold soup (chłodnik litewski), and other countries. The kefir-based soup okroshka is common across the former Soviet Union. Kefir may be used in place of milk on cereal, granola, milkshakes, salad dressing, ice cream, smoothies and soup.

In Estonia, kefir is also often mixed with kama and eaten as a snack or a quick breakfast.

== See also ==
- List of yogurt-based dishes and beverages
- List of fermented milk products
- Lassi
