= Lactobacillus L. anticaries =

Engineered bacterium

Lactobacillus L. anticaries is a bacterium created by the German chemical company BASF. This bacterium has been added to chewing gum, but it does not remove the need to brush one's teeth. L. anticaries eliminates the malignant bacteria in one's mouth in order to help prevent tooth decay. BASF claims that it can destroy this bacterium. The bacterium can be found in many varieties of yogurt.
