= Dellaglioa algida =

Scientific classification
- Domain: Bacteria
- Kingdom: Bacillati
- Phylum: Bacillota
- Class: Bacilli
- Order: Lactobacillales
- Family: Lactobacillaceae
- Genus: Dellaglioa
- Species: D. algida

Binomial name
- Dellaglioa algida Zheng et al. 2020

Type strain
- CIP 106688; DSM 15638; IP 106688; JCM 10491; LMG 19872; M6A9

Synonyms
- Lactobacillus algidus Kato et al. 2000

Species of bacteria

Dellaglioa algida is a species of lactic acid bacteria.
