= Lentilactobacillus buchneri =

Scientific classification
- Domain: Bacteria
- Kingdom: Bacillati
- Phylum: Bacillota
- Class: Bacilli
- Order: Lactobacillales
- Family: Lactobacillaceae
- Genus: Lentilactobacillus
- Species: L. buchneri

Binomial name
- Lentilactobacillus buchneri (Henneberg 1903) Zheng et al. 2020

Synonyms
- Lactobacillus buchneri (Henneberg 1903) Bergey et al. 1923 (Approved Lists 1980); "Bacillus buchneri" Henneberg 1903

Species of bacterium

Lentilactobacillus buchneri is a gram-positive, non-spore forming, anaerobic, rod prokaryote. L. buchneri is a heterofermentative bacteria that produces lactic acid and acetic acid during fermentation. It is used as a bacterial inoculant to improve the aerobic stability of silage. These bacteria are inoculated and used for preventing heating and spoilage after exposure to air.

== Characteristics ==
L. buchneri is a part of the Lactobacillaceae bacteria family. The genus of the bacteria is Lentilactobacillus and the species is Lentilactobacillus buchneri.

== History ==
E.B.Fred, W.H. Peterson, and J.A. Anderson initially discovered the species in 1921 and it was categorized based on the ability to metabolize certain carbon and sugars. This early study showed that this can produce acetic acid, carbon dioxide and large amounts of mannitol. Mannitol which is another carbon source that can be used to produce lactic acid.

== Research ==
L. buchneri are sensitive to low heat and are slow growing. Lactic acid is converted to two most common products which are acetic acid and 1,2-propanediol. Higher concentrations of acetic acid are produced rather than 1,2-propanediol. They both are more effective at reducing the growth of mold and yeast than lactic acid. Strains of L. buchneri may be found in wine since it involves growth of lactic acid bacteria for malolactic fermentation. For this reason winemakers are encouraged to inoculate some malolactic starters to replace indigenous microflora.

Growth in L. buchneri inoculants occurs at 37 °C.

L. buchneri inoculants should only be used when heating cannot be controlled through management.

== Treatment and prevention ==
Although it is not recommended to treat lactobacilli infections, penicillin is the most common treatment for these infections.

Use fermented substances sparingly or inoculate L. buchneri with fermented substances.

== Usage ==
L. buchneri is most beneficial in places where aerobic instability is expected. For instance, high moisture corn is susceptible to spoilage when exposed to air, and for this reason L. buchneri inoculants may benefit. They also may benefit in situations where corn silage is expected to be transferred from one silo to another.

== Products ==
There are many strains of L. buchneri and they are not all necessarily equally effective. Wyeast has a liquid form of L. buchneri used for the making of beer.

== Biosafety level ==
Appropriate safety procedures should always be used with this material. This is a level 1 organism. Suitable for handling microbes that do not cause disease in a healthy human. precautions: hand washing with antibacterial soap and washing surfaces with disinfectants after use.

== See also ==
- Fermentation (biochemistry)
- lactic acid bacteria
