= Lentilactobacillus =

Scientific classification
- Domain: Bacteria
- Kingdom: Bacillati
- Phylum: Bacillota
- Class: Bacilli
- Order: Lactobacillales
- Family: Lactobacillaceae
- Genus: Lentilactobacillus; Zheng et al. 2020

Type species
- Lentilactobacillus buchneri (Henneberg 1903) Zheng et al. 2020

Species
- See text

Genus of bacteria

Lentilactobacillus is a genus of lactic acid bacteria.

== Species ==
The genus Lentilactobacillus comprises the following species:

- Lentilactobacillus buchneri (Henneberg 1903) Zheng et al. 2020
- Lentilactobacillus curieae (Lei et al. 2013) Zheng et al. 2020
- Lentilactobacillus diolivorans (Krooneman et al. 2002) Zheng et al. 2020
- Lentilactobacillus farraginis (Endo and Okada 2007) Zheng et al. 2020
- Lentilactobacillus hilgardii (Douglas and Cruess 1936) Zheng et al. 2020
- Lentilactobacillus kefiri (Kandler and Kunath 1983) Zheng et al. 2020
- Lentilactobacillus kisonensis (Watanabe et al. 2009) Zheng et al. 2020
- Lentilactobacillus kribbianus Bai et al. 2020
- Lentilactobacillus otakiensis (Watanabe et al. 2009) Zheng et al. 2020
- Lentilactobacillus parabuchneri (Farrow et al. 1989) Zheng et al. 2020
- Lentilactobacillus parafarraginis (Endo and Okada 2007) Zheng et al. 2020
- Lentilactobacillus parakefiri (Takizawa et al. 1994) Zheng et al. 2020
- Lentilactobacillus raoultii Zheng et al. 2020
- Lentilactobacillus rapi (Watanabe et al. 2009) Zheng et al. 2020
- Lentilactobacillus senioris (Oki et al. 2012) Zheng et al. 2020
- Lentilactobacillus sunkii (Watanabe et al. 2009) Zheng et al. 2020

== Phylogeny ==
The currently accepted taxonomy is based on the List of Prokaryotic names with Standing in Nomenclature and the phylogeny is based on whole-genome sequences.

- - Lentilactobacillus
    - - - - - - - - - Lentilactobacillus sunkii
                    - Lentilactobacillus otakiensis
                  - Lentilactobacillus kefiri
                - - Lentilactobacillus buchneri
                  - Lentilactobacillus parakefiri
              - Lentilactobacillus parabuchneri
            - Lentilactobacillus rapi
          - Lentilactobacillus kisonensis
        - Lentilactobacillus diolivorans
      - - Lentilactobacillus parafarraginis
        - - Lentilactobacillus hilgardii
          - - Lentilactobacillus farraginis
            - Lentilactobacillus raoultii
    - - Lentilactobacillus senioris
      - Lentilactobacillus curieae
  - outgroup
    Holzapfelia
