= Saccharomyces florentinus =

Scientific classification
- Domain: Eukaryota
- Kingdom: Fungi
- Division: Ascomycota
- Class: Saccharomycetes
- Order: Saccharomycetales
- Family: Saccharomycetaceae
- Genus: Saccharomyces
- Species: S. florentinus

Binomial name
- Saccharomyces florentinus (T. Castelli ex Kudryavtsev) Lodder & Kreger, (1952)

Species of fungus

Saccharomyces florentinus is a yeast which was previously known as Saccharomyces pyriformis.

It is a component of the ginger beer plant used in the making of traditional ginger beer.
