= Lentilactobacillus hilgardii =

Scientific classification
- Domain: Bacteria
- Kingdom: Bacillati
- Phylum: Bacillota
- Class: Bacilli
- Order: Lactobacillales
- Family: Lactobacillaceae
- Genus: Lentilactobacillus
- Species: L. hilgardii

Binomial name
- Lentilactobacillus hilgardii (Douglas and Cruess 1936) Zheng et al. 2020

Type strain
- ATCC 8290 CCUG 30140; CIP 103007; DSM 20176; IFO 15886; JCM 1155; LMG 6895; NBRC 15886; NRRL B-1843

Synonyms
- Bacillus vermiformis Ward 1892; "Betabacterium vermiforme" (Ward 1892) Mayer 1939; "Brevibacterium vermiforme"; Lactobacillus hilgardii Douglas and Cruess 1936 (Approved Lists 1980); "Lactobacillus Type II" Fornachon 1943

Species of bacterium

Lentilactobacillus hilgardii is a species of bacterium found in wine, dairy products, and wine musts.

Its morphology is consistent (on a cellular level) of rods that are 0.5–0.8 micrometres of both single short chains and long filament like structures. On a colony level, the bacteria appears glossy, round and white. For study, the bacteria requires malt agar and can ferment maltose, but often also requires yeast extract in order to ferment properly. To study L. hilgardii in liquid requires growing it in Elliker broth so it can show turbidity and gas formation.

On staining with Gram's iodine, the bacillus is Gram positive. L. hilgardii is considered a negative catalase (enzyme that decomposes hydrogen peroxide into oxygen and water) and creates lactic acid, ethanol/acetic acid, and carbon dioxide. Along with this it is capable of sometimes producing biogenic amines or histamine and ethyl carbamate, which causes health risks.

Its role in the fermentation of wine is that it is impactful when spoiling high-alcohol dessert wines and can be used in malolactic fermentations (winemaking fermentation). Lentilactobacillus hilgardii is sensitive to SO_{2}, both not sensitive and metabolized to sorbate. It is highly tolerant to acids and pH. It is tolerant of ethanol up to 20 vol%.

Lentilactobacillus hilgardii hybridizes easily with Levilactobacillus brevis, a bacterium that it is very closely related to. Prior to its classification as a distinct species, L. hilgardii was believed to be L. brevis, and, as a result, the bacterium's ability to hybridize raised doubts about its taxonomy.

L. hilgardii grows in wine when it contains 1% autolysed yeast. It also grows in ethanol at 15–18%. The bacteria grow best at 30–35 °C, but can grow at temperatures as low as 15 °C.
