= National Collection of Yeast Cultures =

Yeast bank in England

- Headquarters: Quadram Institute, Norwich Research Park, Norwich, United Kingdom
- Area served: Worldwide
- Services: Culture collection
- Parent: QIB Extra Ltd
- Website: http://www.ncyc.co.uk

The National Collection of Yeast Cultures (NCYC) is a British yeast culture collection based at the Norwich Research Park in Norwich, Norfolk, United Kingdom, that currently maintains a collection of over 4400 strains and operates under the Budapest Treaty.

As well as the traditional baking and brewing yeast Saccharomyces cerevisiae, this culture collection also contains hundreds of non-pathogenic yeast species. The yeasts are kept frozen under liquid nitrogen or freeze-dried in glass ampoules. To ensure the collection's safety, it is also duplicated and stored off site. Yeasts have been stored and revived successfully decades later.

== History ==
NCYC were founded in 1948 when a group of British brewers, who later formed the Brewing Industry Research Foundation, decided to store their yeast cultures in a single, safe deposit to ensure their longevity.

In 1981 NCYC evolved into a broader collection when it moved to Institute of Food Research. in Norwich, in which it collected food spoilage yeast which was able to evade the conventional food preservatives.

In 1999, the collection became a part of The United Kingdom National Culture Collection (UKNCC)., which was established to co-ordinate the activities of Britain’s national collections of microbial organisms.

In 2019, the collection moved to the new facility in Quadram Institute Biosciences in the Norwich Research Park where it is currently based.

NCYC trades under QIB Extra Ltd, a wholly owned commercial subsidiary of the Quadram Institute Bioscience, based at the Quadram Institute that specialises in bespoke research services for the food, health and allied industries.
