= Lactobacillus helveticus =

Scientific classification
- Domain: Bacteria
- Kingdom: Bacillati
- Phylum: Bacillota
- Class: Bacilli
- Order: Lactobacillales
- Family: Lactobacillaceae
- Genus: Lactobacillus
- Species: L. helveticus

Binomial name
- Lactobacillus helveticus (Orla-Jensen 1919); Bergey et al. 1925

Species of bacterium

Lactobacillus helveticus is a gram-positive, lactic-acid producing, rod-shaped bacterium of the genus Lactobacillus. It is most commonly used in the production of American Swiss cheese and Emmental cheese, but is also sometimes used in making other styles of cheese, such as Cheddar, Parmesan, Romano, provolone, and mozzarella. The primary function of L. helveticus culture is to prevent bitterness and produce nutty flavors in the final cheese. In Emmental cheese production, L. helveticus is used in conjunction with a Propionibacterium culture, which is responsible for developing the holes (known as "eyes") through production of carbon dioxide gas.

Ingestion of powdered milk fermented with L. helveticus was shown to decrease blood pressure due to the presence of manufactured tripeptides that have ACE inhibitor activity. However, results have been contradictory in later studies.

Lactobacillus helveticus has been studied together with Bifidobacterium longum in the treatment of depression and anxiety. A reduction in psychological stress was observed.

The bacterium's specific name is an adjective derived from "Helvetia", the Latin name for the region occupied by the ancient Helvetii (and for modern Switzerland). The bacterium is also used as probiotic.

== See also ==
- Lactic acid bacteria
