= Peptidiphaga gingivicola =

Scientific classification
- Domain: Bacteria
- Kingdom: Bacillati
- Phylum: Actinomycetota
- Class: Actinomycetes
- Order: Actinomycetales
- Family: Actinomycetaceae
- Genus: Peptidiphaga; Beall et al. 2021
- Species: P. gingivicola

Binomial name
- Peptidiphaga gingivicola Beall et al. 2021

Type strain
- BA112

Genus of bacteria

Peptidiphaga gingivicola is a Gram-positive, non-spore forming, coccus shaped bacterium. Coccus are spherical and generally round in shape. Coccus are differentiated by their groupings that can range from chains, groups, or grape-like clusters. Peptidiphaga gingivicola was observed to grow in groups of 2-5 cocci between 0.2-0.9 mm in diameter. Growth was observed when cultured under anaerobic conditions between 33 and 40 degrees celsius on Blood Brucella agar for 4 days. Peptidiphaga gingivicola has been cultured from patients with periodontal disease, primarily caused by bacterial plaque formation on the gum and teeth of the oral cavity. The microbe is known to break down peptides of the gum causing tissue damage and tooth decay, leading to serious implications for oral health.

== Nomenclature ==
Peptidiphaga gingivicola belongs to the Actinomycetaceae family of bacteria and is located on a branch of the tree with no named members, therefore it can be identified as a new species to the Peptidiphaga genus. Peptidiphaga comes from the term "peptide" which are short chains of amino acids and Greek root "phago" meaning eater, which can be translated to "peptide eater". The species name is indicative of the location of the microbe, where gingivicola comes from the Latin root "gingiva" indicating the "gum" of the oral cavity and Latin root "cola" specifies "inhabitant". Thereby, Peptidiphaga gingivicola can be interpreted as "peptide-eating inhabitant of the gum".

== Discovery and isolation ==
Peptidiphaga gingivicola was first identified by Beall et al. in 2017 from a patient with periodontal disease through the commonly used genome sequencing process of 16S rRNA. The 16S rRNA gene sequencing method is widely used in the field of bioinformatics, for bacterial characterization due to the presence of RNA in most bacteria and archaea. Peptidiphaga gingivicola bacterium is a BA112 strain and grows best under anaerobic conditions. Blood agar plates replicate anaerobic conditions and were used for DNA isolation through a buffer and evenly distributed using glass beads. The 16S rRNA sample was then amplified through PCR using bacterial primers and purified to remove any non-coding regions such as dye terminators. The amplified DNA was then broken down into smaller pieces for reading through the Sanger sequencing method. After removing non-functional DNA, two copies of rRNA repeats were found among the six series of overlapping sequences. Moreover, in consideration of two misassemblies, three final overlaps were established and were used in identifying the phylogeny and taxonomy of the microbe. The phylogenetic relatives were identified through BLAST database comparison of the 1,438 bp 16S rRNA findings.

== Neighboring species ==
=== Actinobaculum sp. ===
Actinobaculum sp. clone (7BB627), a member of the Actinobaculum genus, are uncultured relatives of Peptidiphaga gingivicola. Phylogenetic analysis through 16S rRNA genome sequencing identifies Actinobaculum sp. clone to be the closest relative species belonging in the same genera as Peptidiphaga gingivicola. The microbe was first identified in 2010 amongst the oral cavity of healthy individuals in examining bacterial diversity.

=== Actinomyces oral taxon 848 ===
Actinomyces oral taxon 848 is an unnamed cultivated isolate, identified in 2010 during the establishment of the Human Oral Microbiome Database. 16S rRNA genome sequencing and phylogenetic tree generated through concatenate alignments identifies Actinomyces oral taxon 848 to be another close relative species to Peptidiphaga gingivicola, as identified on the same genus. Actinomyces is an order within the Actinobacteria class, known for their ability to break down organic compounds.

=== Actinobaculum massiliense ===
Actinobaculum massiliense is an anaerobic, Gram-positive bacillus, non-spore forming member of the Actinobacteria phylum, classified under the order of Actinomycetales. It was first isolated in 2002, from the urine of an elderly woman with repeated urinary tract infection. Actinobaculum massilense has been recorded to cause repeated resistance to different antibiotics.

Phylogenetic analysis showed the closest genus to Peptidiphaga gingivicola to be Actinobaculum genus and the recently discovered Actinotignum genus, both genera first identified in the early 2000s. Peptidiphaga gingivicola is the first identified species on the Actinomycetaceae genus and Actinobaculum massiliense to be the closest named species within the neighboring genus. The phylogenetic comparison method utilized by Beall's research included the alignment of a sequence 16S rRNA genome. The process of combining multiple sequence alignments into a single alignment, a process known as "concatenate alignments'' was also used to compare against other known species. The comparison of average amino acid identity (AAI) in the three unique regions of the "concatenate alignment" and predicted trees using the BLAST produced the same results, where Peptidaphaga gingivicola was clustered in ranges within the tree topology of Actinobaculum massiliense. Average amino acid identity is a value that provides a comparison between two sequences on how similar their amino acid sequences are compared to each other. BA114 type strain is representative of the previously mentioned Actinobaculum massiliense; it showed 90% similarity on the BLAST database to Peptidiphaga gingivicola. The average amino acid identity (AAI) between the closest matches of Peptidiphaga gingivicola which include BA114 (Actinobaculum massiliense) and Actinobaculum sp. was 98.51%.

== Growth and physiology ==
Peptidiphaga gingivicola is within the Actinomycetaceae genera and lives in the oral cavity, specifically beneath the gums or gingiva. In the study titled "Cultivation of Peptidiphaga gingivicola from subgingival plaque: the first representative of a novel genus of Actinomycetaceae", it was found that an isolate of the microbe grew well in an anaerobic environment, but did not grow well in ambient air. Maximal growth rate was observed between 33°C and 40°C and the optimal pH for growth was between 6-7.0.

Growth of Actinobacteria generally involves extension of their tips and generation of hyphae that branch out. These microbes reproduce by sporulation from the mycelium they produce. However, Peptidiphaga gingivicola are an exception to this trend as they do not form spores. Moreover, most Actinobacteria like Peptidiphaga gingivicola are chemoheterotrophic and therefore can use a diverse set of nutritional sources.

== Morphology ==
Gram staining shows Peptidiphaga gingivicola is a Gram-positive cocci that grows in groupings of a few cells. Actinobacteria including Peptidiphaga gingivicola appear conical and compact with a dry surface on culture media and are often leathery. In the study "Cultivation of Peptidiphaga gingivicola from subgingival plaque: the first representative of a novel genus of Actinomycetaceae", Peptidiphaga gingivicola were incubated in blood agar for 6 days. After four days of incubation, colonies were visible. Specifically, the colonies were off-white in color and shiny. They appeared round and raised with a small indentation on top and seemed to have a smooth texture. After about five days of incubation, colonies began to appear waxy and solid. Based on observations, the colonies formed were also determined to be non-hemolytic and their diameter was measured to be about 0.2 to 0.9 mm.

== Metabolism ==
Peptidiphaga gingivicola metabolizes amino acids including Ala, Arg, Gly, His, Leu, Pro, Ser, Tyr, and sometimes Phe. Chemical tests confirm Peptidiphaga gingivicola produces acetoin, acid phosphatase, alanyl-phenylalanyl-proline arylamidase, and naphthol-AS-BI-BD-phosphohydrolase. Additionally, the study "Cultivation of Peptidiphaga gingivicola from subgingival plaque: the first representative of a novel genus of Actinomycetaceae'' found that Leucyl-glycine arylamidase activity was variable in the microbe. As a result, it has been implied that Peptidiphaga gingivicola produces these enzymes to help break down proteins composed of the amino acids mentioned previously.

Further, there is much evidence suggesting that the microbe does not use carbohydrates for energy. The same study "Cultivation of Peptidiphaga gingivicola from subgingival plaque: the first representative of a novel genus of Actinomycetaceae'' confirmed that carbohydrate substrates including arabinose, fucose, mannose, D-arabitol, glucose, glycogen, lactose, maltose, mannitol, ribose, saccharose, xylose, gelatin, glutamic acid, melezitose, melibose, pullulane, raffinose, sorbital, tagatose, trehalose, and the amino acid valine were not used by the microbe. Several other chemical tests were conducted and results were negative for urease, esculin, nitrate reduction, indole, catalase, A- and B- galactosidase, A- and B-Glucosidase, chymotrypsin, fucosidase, alkaline phosphatase, A- and B-mannosidase, arginine dihydrolase, B-galactosidase-6-phosphate, B-glucuronidase, cystine arylamidase, esterase, esterase lipase, glycyl-tryptophan arylamidase, hippurate hydrolysis, lipase, Methyl-BD-Glucopyranoside Acidification, N-Acetyl-B- Glucosaminidase, pyrazinamidase, pyrolidonyl arylamidase, and trypsin. Overall, it is implied that the metabolism of Peptidiphaga gingivicola is limited because it does not produce many of the key enzymes needed for metabolic processes commonly observed in other organisms such as lipase, an enzyme responsible for breakdown of lipids. Consequently, Peptidiphaga gingivicola is limited to amino acids as its nutrient source.

== Importance ==
Peptidiphaga gingivicola is one of many species of bacteria that inhabits the oral cavity of humans. Many species of bacteria that live in the human oral cavity have not yet been cultivated which can be an issue because there is evidence supporting an association between uncultivated bacterial strains and disease. One condition of focus is periodontitis which involves interactions between host cells within mammals and bacteria living beneath the gingiva that we lack information about. Therefore, the cultivation of Peptidiphaga gingivicola may serve as a gateway into the bacterial world that exists in the oral cavity. By learning more about the bacterial populations housed within the oral cavity, disease processes that involve bacterial and host cell interactions as represented with periodontal disease can be further understood.

Further, Actinobacteria like Peptidiphaga gingivicola can produce specific compounds that play a role in cancer treatment. Not to mention, more than 65% of antibiotics used in medicine have been derived from Actinobacteria.

Actinobacteria can also convert underused agricultural and urban wastes into useful chemical products via several biological mechanisms. Actinobacteria can break down many toxic compounds including pesticides contaminating soil. Some strains of Actinobacteria stimulate plant growth and disease resistance, protecting plants from plant pathogens. Thus, Actinobacteria can be useful in biocontrol.
