= Mannosidosis =

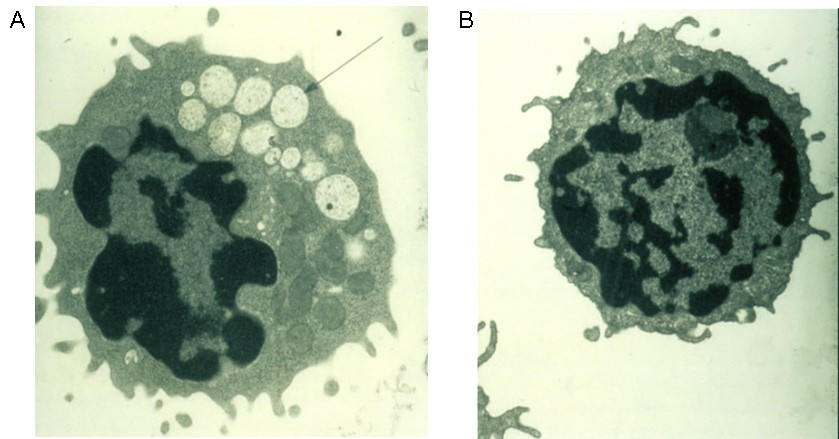
- Electron micrograph of a vacuolated lymphocyte from a mannosidosis patient (A) as compared to a lymphocyte from a normal control (B).
- Specialty: Pediatrics, endocrinology

Mannosidosis is a deficiency in mannosidase, an enzyme. There are two types: alpha-mannosidosis and beta-mannosidosis. Both disorders are related to the lysosome and have similar presentation; the former is caused by defective lysosomal α-mannosidase and the latter by defective lysosomal β-mannosidase. In both cases, the defect causes accumulation of oligosaccharides rich in mannose in the neural tissue and organ tissue. Both alpha- and beta-mannosidosis are known to result from autosomal recessive genetic mutations.

== Alpha-mannosidosis ==
Alpha-mannosidosis is an inherited lysosomal storage disease that causes hearing loss, intellectual disability, facial and skeletal abnormalities, and immunological deficiencies. The main characteristics include skeletal abnormalities, hearing impairment, gradual impairment of mental functions and speech, and frequent periods of psychosis. Immune deficiency is manifested by recurrent infections, especially in the first decade of life. Autosomal recessive mutations in the MAN2B1 gene, which is situated on chromosome 19 (19 p13.2-q12), are the cause of alpha-mannosidosis. Acid alpha-mannosidase activity within leukocytes or other nucleated cells is used to make the diagnosis, which can then be verified by genetic testing.

== Beta-mannosidosis ==
Beta-mannosidosis is an extremely rare metabolic storage disease caused by a deficiency of the enzyme beta-mannosidase, which is involved in the breakdown of glycoproteins. The clinical manifestation can range from mild to severe and includes symptoms like hearing loss, mental retardation, hyperactivity, behavioral issues, and recurrent respiratory and skin infections.

== See also ==
- Swainsonine
