= Trueperella pyogenes =

Scientific classification
- Domain: Bacteria
- Kingdom: Bacillati
- Phylum: Actinomycetota
- Class: Actinomycetes
- Order: Actinomycetales
- Family: Actinomycetaceae
- Genus: Trueperella
- Species: T. pyogenes

Binomial name
- Trueperella pyogenes (Glage 1903) Yassin et al. 2011

Type strain
- ATCC 19411; C-100; CCUG 13230; CIP 103129; DSM 20630; LMG 16162; NCTC 5224

Synonyms
- Actinomyces pyogenes (Glage 1903) Collins and Jones 1983; Arcanobacterium pyogenes (Glage 1903) Pascual Ramos et al. 1997; Actinomyces pyogenes (Glage 1903) Reddy et al. 1982; "Bacillus pyogenes" Glage 1903; Corynebacterium pyogenes (Glage 1903) Eberson 1918 (Approved Lists 1980)

Species of bacterium

Trueperella pyogenes is a species of nonmotile, facultatively anaerobic, Gram-positive bacteria. It is known for causing opportunistic, suppurative infections in animals, and less commonly, in humans.

When the genus Arcanobacterium was split into two (Arcanobacterium and Trueperella gen. nov.), the new genus name was chosen in honor of German microbiologist Hans G. Trüper.

The specific name pyogenes, used in various bacterial genera, was derived from the Greek puon or Latin pyum and suffix -genes, yielding pyogenes, meaning "pus-producing".

== Microbiology ==
The cells typically measure 0.5 by 2.0 μm. They appear as pleomorphic or coccoid rods. They tend to be grouped singly or in short chains but are sometimes grouped into V-shaped pairs. Short diphtheroid shapes can also be observed, especially in young cultures.

It is not a particularly fastidious organism, however, media enriched with blood or serum must be used. Colonies create a zone of beta-hemolysis on blood agar plates and test negative for catalase. Although it can thrive in either anaerobic or aerobic environments, it is ideally suited to one with high (about 7%) levels of carbon dioxide.

The pathogenicity of this bacterium is believed to arise from its virulence factors, such as pyolysin, collagen-binding proteins, neuraminidases, fimbriae and exoenzymes. These factors support tissue colonization, immune evasion and tissue destruction. Interestingly, there are no obvious differences in the virulence genotypes of commensal and clinical isolates.

Despite its large impact on animal husbandry, the T. pyogenes transmission cycle is poorly characterized, although endogenous infection and environmental contamination are likely sources.

While T. pyogenes can be the primary etiological agent, it is more commonly found in polymicrobial diseases, and is frequently associated with Gram-negative anaerobes, such as Escherichia coli, Fusobacterium necrophorum, Bacteroides spp., and Peptoniphilus indolicus. In particular, there is a very strong synergistic relationship between T. pyogenes and F. necrophorum.

== Clinical Relevance ==
T. pyogenes is found in the urogenital, gastrointestinal, and upper respiratory tracts of cattle, goats, horses, musk deer, pigs, and sheep, in which it may cause abscesses, lymphadenitis, endocarditis, encephalitis, septicaemia, and pneumonia. The most common disease in dairy cows arising from T.pyogenes is metritis and endometritis, which can develop in 23-52% of animals after parturition. In other domestic animals, infections are rare, with T. pyogenes infections sporadically isolated in dogs, cats and rabbits.

In humans, T. pyogenes infection is rare, and is typically associated with occupational exposure to farm animals and in immunocompromised populations, and most commonly presents as sepsis, endocarditis, and pneumonia. Patients presenting with intraabdominal infections, skin ulcers, arthritis, and pyelitis have also been reported. The clinical course of suppurative infections caused by T. pyogenes can be quite severe, with mortality rates increasing with misdiagnosis or incorrect treatment.

Microscopy, in vitro culture, and molecular techniques can be used to diagnose T. pyogenes infection. Treatment usually includes antibiotics such as beta-lactams, tetracyclines, and macrolides, although there is concern for emerging resistance to these antibiotics due to their overuse in agriculture.
