= F. grandis =

F. grandis may refer to:

- Fundulus grandis, the Gulf killifish, a fish species in the genus Fundulus
- Falcivibrio grandis, a bacterium species in the genus Falcivibrio

== See also ==
- Grandis (disambiguation)
