= Gleimia hominis =

Scientific classification
- Domain: Bacteria
- Kingdom: Bacillati
- Phylum: Actinomycetota
- Class: Actinomycetia
- Order: Actinomycetales
- Family: Actinomycetaceae
- Genus: Gleimia
- Species: G. hominis

Binomial name
- Gleimia hominis (Funke et al. 2010) Nouioui et al. 2018

Type strain
- 1094

Synonyms
- Actinomyces hominis

Species of bacterium

Gleimia hominis is a bacterium from the genus of Gleimia which has been isolated from a wound swab.
