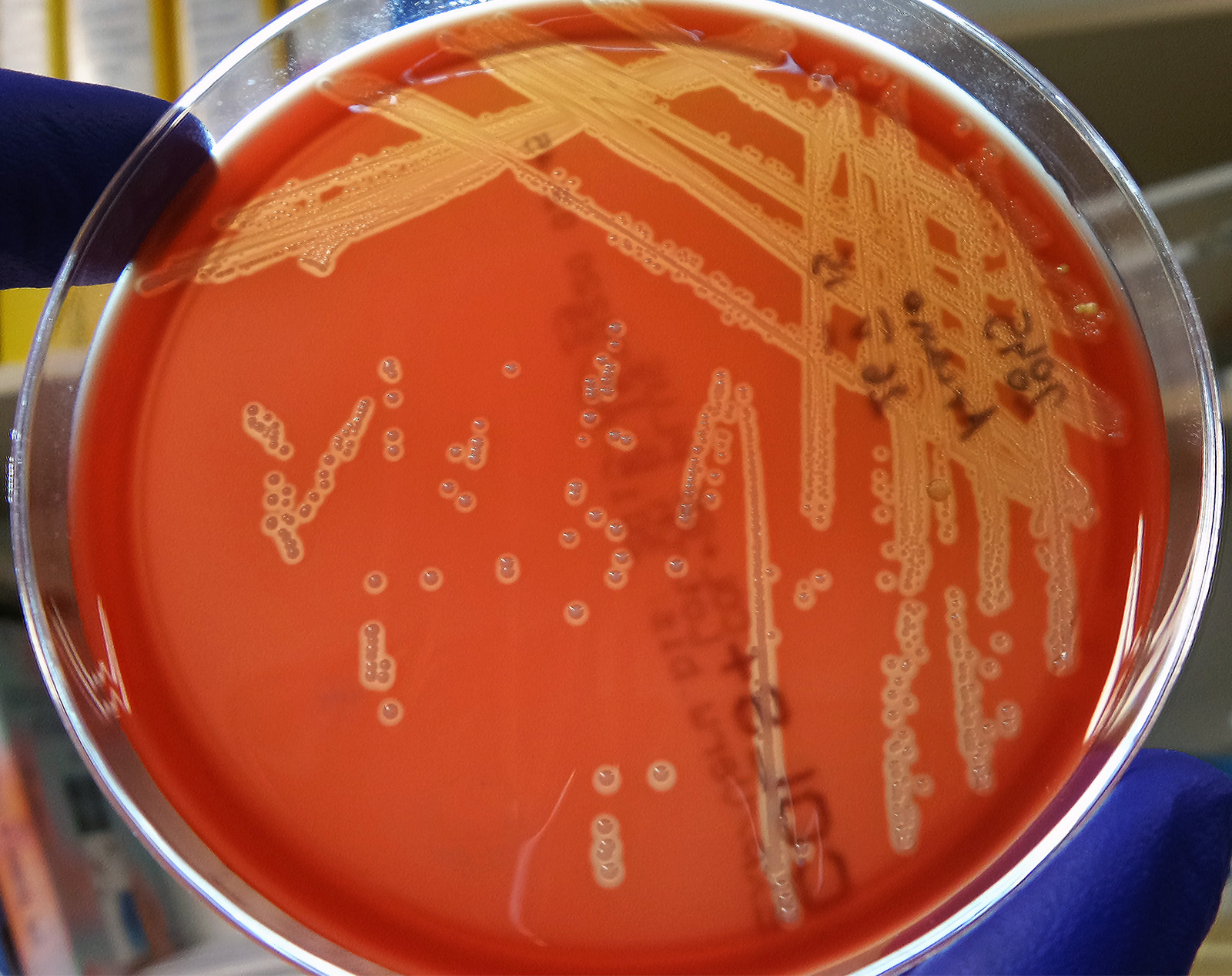
- Arcanobacterium haemolyticum colonies on a blood agar plate: Beta-hemolysis is demonstrated with transmitted light.

Scientific classification
- Domain: Bacteria
- Kingdom: Bacillati
- Phylum: Actinomycetota
- Class: Actinomycetes
- Order: Actinomycetales
- Family: Actinomycetaceae
- Genus: Arcanobacterium
- Species: A. haemolyticum

Binomial name
- Arcanobacterium haemolyticum (ex Mac Lean et al. 1946) Collins et al. 1983

Synonyms
- Corynebacterium haemolyticum MacLean et al. 1946

= Arcanobacterium haemolyticum =

Species of bacterium

Arcanobacterium haemolyticum is a species of bacteria classified as a gram-positive bacillus. It is catalase-negative, facultative anaerobic, beta-hemolytic, and not motile. It has been known to cause head and neck infections, pharyngitis, and sinusitis (Arcanobacterium haemolyticum infections).

== History ==
It was first described by MacClean et al. in 1946 from US servicemen and peoples of the South Pacific suffering from sore throat. Due to its resemblance to another genus of bacteria, Corynebacterium, A. haemolyticum was initially classified as C. pyogenes subspecies hominus. It was known for several decades as Corynebacterium haemolyticum; controversies regarding classification were resolved in 1982 when a new genus, Arcanobacterium, was created by Collins et al. to reclassify Corynebacterium haemolyticum on the basis of its peptidoglycan, fatty acid, and DNA characteristics.

Since its initial description, the spectrum of diseases caused by A. haemolyticum has been expanded to include sepsis and osteomyelitis. Organisms are Gram-positive, facultative anaerobic, catalase-negative rods (but transition to the coccal shape occurs as the organism grows) with arrangements described as matchbox or Chinese letters arrangements. Growth is enhanced in blood and by carbon dioxide.

== Detection ==
Hemolysis is detected on human blood agar plates, and routine plating of specimens suspected of containing A. haemolyticum on human blood agar is suggested to distinguish it from Streptococcus pyogenes, as A. haemolyticum can easily be confused with this organism. Microscopic morphology differences can be used to differentiate them, since Arcanobacterium is rod-shaped and Streptococcus is coccus-shaped.

A. haemolyticum infection is most common in 15- to 25-year-old persons and manifests as exudative pharyngitis and/or tonsillitis accompanied by cervical lymphadenopathy. Symptoms look like those of β-hemolytic streptococci or viral infection. A rash of the chest and of the abdomen, neck, or extremities is seen in 20% to 25% of cases, enhancing the risk of diagnostic error as streptococcal infection or penicillin allergy, when β-lactam therapy is initiated without exact diagnosis.

A. haemolyticum often occurs in polymicrobic infections together with typical respiratory pathogens such as streptococci. The isolation of classical pathogens from specimens that also contain A. haemolyticum might be in part responsible for the tendency to miss the organism.

== Pathology ==
A. haemolyticum is the cause of pharyngitis (sore throat) in up to 2.5% of cases. In one study, it was the causative agent of pharyngitis in 1.4% of military conscripts. It is rarely found in the skin or throat of healthy people, meaning it is not a member of the usual bacterial flora.

Little is known about the means by which A. haemolyticum causes infection or the associated skin manifestations. The organism is known to produce uncharacterized hemolytic agent(s), a neuraminidase and a phospholipase D (PLD) acting preferentially on sphingomyelin. PLD is known to result in tissue damage, but the role in disease of the cytotoxic effect caused by this extracellular toxin is not established.

Pyothorax has been reported.

== Treatment ==
A. haemolyticum isolated from humans is susceptible to erythromycin (proposed as the first-line drug), clindamycin, gentamicin, and cephalosporins.

The use of parenteral antimicrobial drugs must be limited to serious infections.

== See also ==
- Arcanobacterium haemolyticum infection
