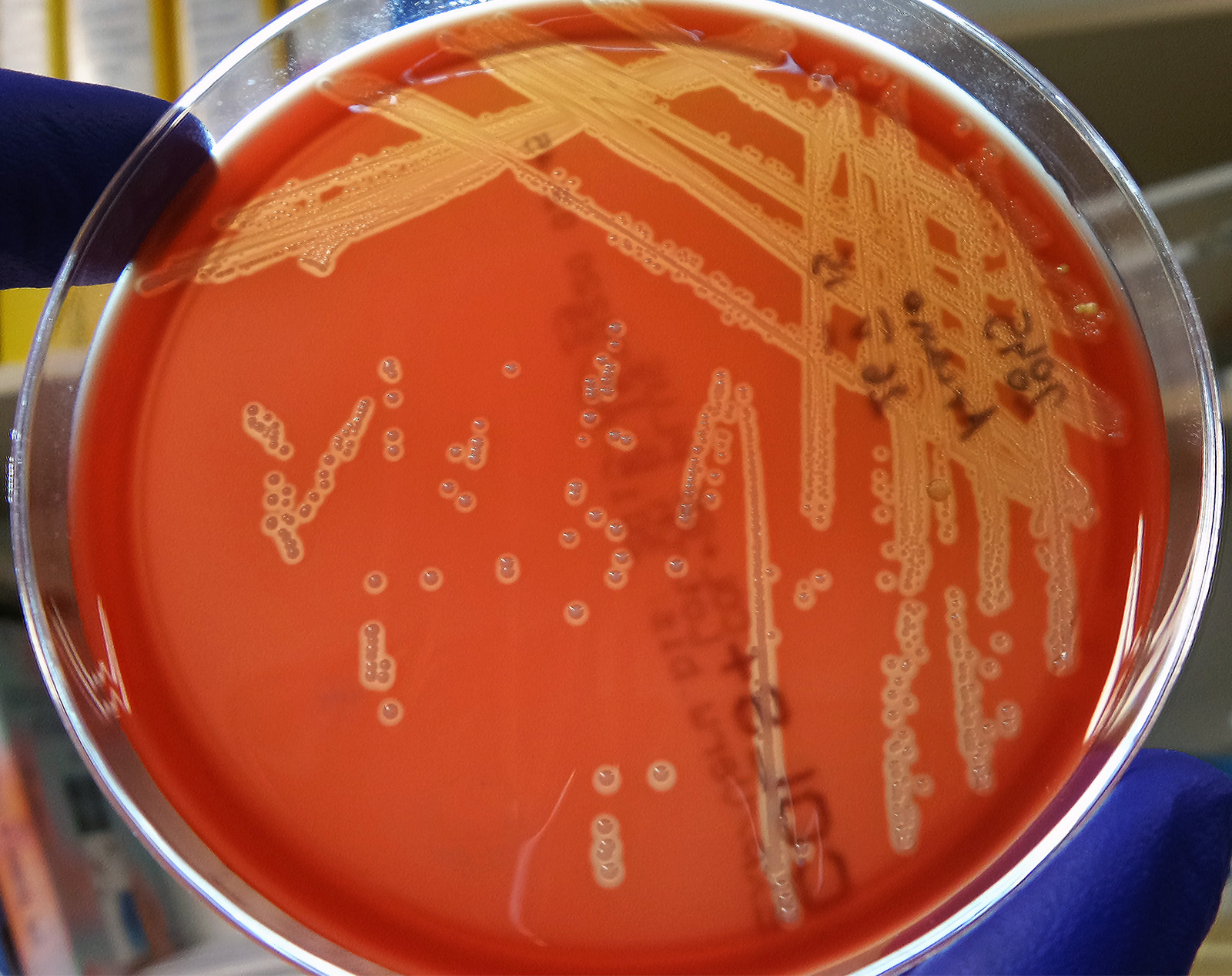
- Arcanobacterium haemolyticum colonies on a blood agar plate: Beta-hemolysis is demonstrated with transmitted light.

Scientific classification
- Domain: Bacteria
- Kingdom: Bacillati
- Phylum: Actinomycetota
- Class: Actinomycetes
- Order: Actinomycetales
- Family: Actinomycetaceae
- Genus: Arcanobacterium; Collins et al 1983

Species
- See text.

= Arcanobacterium =

Genus of bacteria

Arcanobacterium (/ɑːrˈkeɪnoʊbækˌtɪəriəm/) is a genus of bacteria. They are gram-positive, non–acid fast, nonmotile, facultatively anaerobic, and non–endospore forming. They are widely distributed in nature in the microbiota of animals (including the human microbiota) and are mostly innocuous. Some can cause disease in humans and other animals (for example, Arcanobacterium haemolyticum infections). As with various species of a microbiota (including their cousins in the genera Corynebacterium and Trueperella), they usually are not pathogenic but can occasionally opportunistically capitalize on atypical access to tissues (via wounds) or weakened host defenses.

== Taxonomy ==
As explained by Yassin et al., the genus Arcanobacterium was first described by Collins et al. in 1982 to accommodate bacterial strains previously assigned to the genus Corynebacterium variously (and controversially) as C. pyogenes hominis and then C. haemolyticum, thenceforth to be known as Arcanobacterium haemolyticum. The name (from arcanus + bacterium) means "secretive bacterium" or "enigmatic/mysterious bacterium". In 2011, Yassin et al., on the basis of 16S rRNA signature nucleotide comparisons, menaquinone and phospholipid compositions, and Christie–Atkins–Munch-Petersen (CAMP) tests, proposed that four species—A. haemolyticum, A. hippocoleae, A. phocae, and A. pluranimalium—should continue to be affiliated with the genus Arcanobacterium, whereas the species A. abortisuis, A. bernardiae, A. bialowiezense, A. bonasi, and A. pyogenes should be reclassified as members of a new genus, Trueperella, as Trueperella abortisuis comb. nov., Trueperella bernardiae comb. nov., Trueperella bialowiezensis comb. nov., Trueperella bonasi comb. nov., and Trueperella pyogenes comb. nov. Therefore, they provided an emended description of the genus Arcanobacterium.

In 2001, Lawson et al. reported that A. pluranimalium sp. nov. had been isolated from a harbour porpoise and a deer. In 2002, Hoyles et al. reported that A. hippocoleae sp. nov. had been isolated from a vaginal discharge of a horse.

In 2012, Hijazin et al. reported that A. canis sp. nov. had been isolated from otitis externa in a dog. In 2013 the same group (with Hijazin, Sammra, and others) reported that A. phocisimile sp. nov. had been isolated from harbor seals. In 2015, the same group (with Sammra and others) reported that A. pinnipediorum sp. nov. had also been isolated from a harbor seal.

== Species ==
- A. bovis Sammra et al. 2020
- A. bovis Alssahen et al. 2022
- A. canis Hijazin et al. 2012
- A. haemolyticum (ex MacLean et al. 1946) Collins et al. 1983
- A. hippocoleae Hoyles et al. 2002
- A. ihumii Fall et al. 2019
- A. phocae Pascual Ramos et al. 1997
- A. phocisimile Hijazin et al. 2013
- A. pinnipediorum Sammra et al. 2015
- A. pluranimalium Lawson et al. 2001
- A. wilhelmae Sammra et al. 2017
