= Actinotignum schaalii =

Scientific classification
- Domain: Bacteria
- Kingdom: Bacillati
- Phylum: Actinomycetota
- Class: Actinomycetes
- Order: Actinomycetales
- Family: Actinomycetaceae
- Genus: Actinotignum
- Species: A. schaalii

Binomial name
- Actinotignum schaalii (Lawson et al. 1997) Yassin et al. 2015

Synonyms
- Actinobaculum schaalii Lawson et al. 1997

Species of bacterium

Actinotignum schaalii is a bacterium first isolated from human blood cultures. Its type strain is CCUG 27420. It is a Gram-positive, facultative anaerobic coccoid rod, considered a human pathogen.
