= RDP =

RDP may refer to:

== Computing ==
- Ramer–Douglas–Peucker algorithm, an algorithm for polygonal simplification
- Recombination detection program, for analysing genetic recombination
- Recursive descent parser, a type of top-down parser
- Remote Desktop Protocol, a Microsoft remote access network protocol
- Reliable Data Protocol, a transport layer network protocol

== Organisations ==
- Rally for Democracy and Progress (disambiguation), several political parties
- Democratic and Popular Rally (French: Rassemblement Démocratique et Populaire), a Burkina Faso political party
- Radiodifusão Portuguesa, a subsidiary of Rádio e Televisão de Portugal, the public service broadcasting organisation of Portugal
- Red Deer Polytechnic, a polytechnic institute in Red Deer, Alberta, Canada

== Other uses ==
- RDP (film), Fujifilm photographic films
- Ratos de Porão, a Brazilian hardcore band
- Reconstruction and Development Programme, South Africa
- Recreational Dive Planner
- Roll of Distinguished Philatelists
- Kazi Nazrul Islam Airport, Andal, West Bengal, India, IATA code
- Bus Route Development Programme
