= Mannosidase =

Enzyme to hydrolyse mannose

Mannosidase is an enzyme which hydrolyses mannose.

There are two types:

- alpha-Mannosidase
- beta-Mannosidase

A deficiency is associated with mannosidosis.

A family of mannosidases are also responsible for processing newly formed glycoproteins in the endoplasmic reticulum into mature glycoproteins containing highly heterogeneous complex-type glycans.
