= Arcanobacterium hippocoleae =

Scientific classification
- Domain: Bacteria
- Kingdom: Bacillati
- Phylum: Actinomycetota
- Class: Actinomycetes
- Order: Actinomycetales
- Family: Actinomycetaceae
- Genus: Arcanobacterium
- Species: A. hippocoleae

Binomial name
- Arcanobacterium hippocoleae Hoyles et al. 2002

Species of bacterium

Arcanobacterium hippocoleae is a species of bacteria. It is a gram-positive, facultatively anaerobic, club-shaped (coryneform) species first isolated from a vaginal discharge of a horse. The type strain of A. hippocoleae is CCUG 44697T (=CIP 106850T).
