= Varibaculum anthropi =

Scientific classification
- Domain: Bacteria
- Kingdom: Bacillati
- Phylum: Actinomycetota
- Class: Actinomycetes
- Order: Actinomycetales
- Family: Actinomycetaceae
- Genus: Varibaculum
- Species: V. anthropi

Binomial name
- Varibaculum anthropi Glaeser et al. 2017

Type strain
- JCM 19104; CCUG 31793; CCUG 44221; CCUG 44993; CCUG 45114; CCUG 61255

Species of bacterium

Varibaculum anthropi is a Gram-positive and strictly anaerobic, rod-shaped bacterium from the genus of Varibaculum which was first isolated from human urine from Gothenburg in Sweden.
