= Varibaculum cambriense =

Scientific classification
- Domain: Bacteria
- Kingdom: Bacillati
- Phylum: Actinomycetota
- Class: Actinomycetes
- Order: Actinomycetales
- Family: Actinomycetaceae
- Genus: Varibaculum
- Species: V. cambriense

Binomial name
- Varibaculum cambriense corrig. Hall et al. 2003

Type strain
- CCUG 44998; CIP 107344; DSM 15806; R12359

Synonyms
- Varibaculum cambriensis Hall et al. 2003

Species of bacterium

Varibaculum cambriense is a Gram-positive and anaerobic bacterium from the genus of Varibaculum which has been isolated from a human postauricular abscess.
