= Flaviflexus ciconiae =

Scientific classification
- Domain: Bacteria
- Kingdom: Bacillati
- Phylum: Actinomycetota
- Class: Actinomycetia
- Order: Actinomycetales
- Family: Actinomycetaceae
- Genus: Flaviflexus
- Species: F. ciconiae

Binomial name
- Flaviflexus ciconiae Lee et al. 2020

Type strain
- H23T48

Species of bacterium

Flaviflexus ciconiae is a Gram-positive, non-spore-forming and strictly aerobic bacterium from the genus of Flaviflexus which has been isolated from the faeces of the stork Ciconia boyciana from the Seoul Grand Park Zoo in Korea.
