= Alignment-free sequence analysis =

Methods in computational biology

In bioinformatics, alignment-free sequence analysis approaches to molecular sequence and structure data provide alternatives over alignment-based approaches.

The emergence and need for the analysis of different types of data generated through biological research has given rise to the field of bioinformatics. Molecular sequence and structure data of DNA, RNA, and proteins, gene expression profiles or microarray data, metabolic pathway data are some of the major types of data being analysed in bioinformatics. Among them sequence data is increasing at the exponential rate due to advent of next-generation sequencing technologies. Since the origin of bioinformatics, sequence analysis has remained the major area of research with wide range of applications in database searching, genome annotation, comparative genomics, molecular phylogeny and gene prediction. The pioneering approaches for sequence analysis were based on sequence alignment either global or local, pairwise or multiple sequence alignment. Alignment-based approaches generally give excellent results when the sequences under study are closely related and can be reliably aligned, but when the sequences are divergent, a reliable alignment cannot be obtained and hence the applications of sequence alignment are limited. Another limitation of alignment-based approaches is their computational complexity and are time-consuming and thus, are limited when dealing with large-scale sequence data. The advent of next-generation sequencing technologies has resulted in generation of voluminous sequencing data. The size of this sequence data poses challenges on alignment-based algorithms in their assembly, annotation and comparative studies.

== Alignment-free methods ==
Alignment-free methods can broadly be classified into five categories: a) methods based on k-mer/word frequency, b) methods based on the length of common substrings, c) methods based on the number of (spaced) word matches, d) methods based on micro-alignments, e) methods based on information theory and f) methods based on graphical representation. Alignment-free approaches have been used in sequence similarity searches, clustering and classification of sequences, and more recently in phylogenetics (Figure 1).

Such molecular phylogeny analyses employing alignment-free approaches are said to be part of next-generation phylogenomics. A number of review articles provide in-depth review of alignment-free methods in sequence analysis.

The AFproject is an international collaboration to benchmark and compare software tools for alignment-free sequence comparison.

=== Methods based on k-mer/word frequency ===
The popular methods based on k-mer/word frequencies include feature frequency profile (FFP), Composition vector (CV), Return time distribution (RTD), and frequency chaos game representation (FCGR).

==== Feature frequency profile (FFP) ====
FFP methodology starts by calculating the count of each possible k-mer (possible number of k-mers for nucleotide sequence: 4^{k}, while that for protein sequence: 20^{k}) in sequences. Each k-mer count in each sequence is then normalized by dividing it by total of all k-mers' count in that sequence. This leads to conversion of each sequence into its feature frequency profile. The pair wise distance between two sequences is then calculated Jensen–Shannon (JS) divergence between their respective FFPs. The distance matrix thus obtained can be used to construct phylogenetic tree using clustering algorithms like neighbor-joining, UPGMA etc.

==== Composition vector (CV) ====
In this method frequency of appearance of each possible k-mer in a given sequence is calculated. The next characteristic step of this method is the subtraction of random background of these frequencies using Markov model to reduce the influence of random neutral mutations to highlight the role of selective evolution. The normalized frequencies are put a fixed order to form the composition vector (CV) of a given sequence. Cosine distance function is then used to compute pairwise distance between CVs of sequences. The distance matrix thus obtained can be used to construct phylogenetic tree using clustering algorithms like neighbor-joining, UPGMA etc. This method can be extended through resort to efficient pattern matching algorithms to include in the computation of the composition vectors: (i) all k-mers for any value of k, (ii) all substrings of any length up to an arbitrarily set maximum k value, (iii) all maximal substrings, where a substring is maximal if extending it by any character would cause a decrease in its occurrence count.

==== Return time distribution (RTD) ====
The RTD based method does not calculate the count of k-mers in sequences, instead it computes the time required for the reappearance of k-mers. The time refers to the number of residues in successive appearance of particular k-mer. Thus the occurrence of each k-mer in a sequence is calculated in the form of RTD, which is then summarised using two statistical parameters mean (μ) and standard deviation (σ). Thus each sequence is represented in the form of numeric vector of size 2⋅4^{k} containing μ and σ of 4^{k} RTDs. The pair wise distance between sequences is calculated using Euclidean distance measure. The distance matrix thus obtained can be used to construct phylogenetic tree using clustering algorithms like neighbor-joining, UPGMA etc. A recent approach Pattern Extraction through Entropy Retrieval (PEER) provides direct detection of the k-mer length and summarised the occurrence interval using entropy.

==== Frequency chaos game representation (FCGR) ====
The FCGR methods have evolved from chaos game representation (CGR) technique, which provides scale independent representation for genomic sequences. The CGRs can be divided by grid lines where each grid square denotes the occurrence of oligonucleotides of a specific length in the sequence. Such representation of CGRs is termed as Frequency Chaos Game Representation (FCGR). This leads to representation of each sequence into FCGR. The pair wise distance between FCGRs of sequences can be calculated using the Pearson distance, the Hamming distance or the Euclidean distance.

==== Spaced-word frequencies ====
While most alignment-free algorithms compare the word-composition of sequences, Spaced Words uses a pattern of care and don't care positions. The occurrence of a spaced word in a sequence is then defined by the characters at the match positions only, while the characters at the don't care positions are ignored. Instead of comparing the frequencies of contiguous words in the input sequences, this approach compares the frequencies of the spaced words according to the pre-defined pattern. Note that the pre-defined pattern can be selected by analysis of the Variance of the number of matches, the probability of the first occurrence on several models, or the Pearson correlation coefficient between the expected word frequency and the true alignment distance.

=== Methods based on length of common substrings ===
The methods in this category employ the similarity and differences of substrings in a pair of sequences. These algorithms were mostly used for string processing in computer science.

==== Average common substring (ACS) ====
In this approach, for a chosen pair of sequences (A and B of lengths n and m respectively), longest substring starting at some position is identified in one sequence (A) which exactly matches in the other sequence (B) at any position. In this way, lengths of longest substrings starting at different positions in sequence A and having exact matches at some positions in sequence B are calculated. All these lengths are averaged to derive a measure $L(A, B)$. Intuitively, larger the $L(A, B)$, the more similar the two sequences are. To account for the differences in the length of sequences, $L(A, B)$ is normalized [i.e. $L(A, B)/\log(m)$]. This gives the similarity measure between the sequences.

In order to derive a distance measure, the inverse of similarity measure is taken and a correction term is subtracted from it to assure that $d(A, A)$ will be zero. Thus

$$d(A, B) = \left [ \frac{\log m}{L(A, B)} \right] - \left[\frac{\log n}{L(A, A)} \right].$$

This measure $d(A, B)$ is not symmetric, so one has to compute $d_s(A, B) = d_s(B, A) = (d(A, B) + d(B, A))/2$, which gives final ACS measure between the two strings (A and B). The subsequence/substring search can be efficiently performed by using suffix trees.

==== Mutation distances (Kr) ====
This approach is closely related to the ACS, which calculates the number of substitutions per site between two DNA sequences using the shortest absent substring (termed as shustring).

=== Methods based on the number of (spaced) word matches ===
==== $D_2^S$ and $D_2^*$ ====
These approachese are variants of the $D_2$ statistics that counts the number of $k$-mer matches between two sequences. They improve the simple $D_2$ statistics by taking the background distribution of the compared sequences into account.

==== MASH ====
This is an extremely fast method that uses the MinHash bottom sketch strategy for estimating the Jaccard index of the multi-sets of $k$-mers of two input sequences. That is, it estimates the ratio of $k$-mer matches to the total number of $k$-mers of the sequences. This can be used, in turn, to estimate the evolutionary distances between the compared sequences, measured as the number of substitutions per sequence position since the sequences evolved from their last common ancestor.

==== Slope-Tree ====
This approach calculates a distance value between two protein sequences based on the decay of the number of $k$-mer matches if $k$ increases.

==== Slope-SpaM ====
This method calculates the number $N_k$ of $k$-mer or spaced-word matches (SpaM) for different values for the word length or number of match positions $k$ in the underlying pattern, respectively. The slope of an affine-linear function $F$ that depends on $N_k$ is calculated to estimate the Jukes-Cantor distance between the input sequences .

==== Skmer ====
Skmer calculates distances between species from unassembled sequencing reads. Similar to MASH, it uses the Jaccard index on the sets of $k$-mers from the input sequences. In contrast to MASH, the program is still accurate for low sequencing coverage, so it can be used for genome skimming.

=== Methods based on micro-alignments ===
Strictly spoken, these methods are not alignment-free. They are using simple gap-free micro-alignments where sequences are required to match at certain pre-defined positions. The positions aligned at the remaining positions of the micro-alignments where mismatches are allowed, are then used for phylogeny inference.

==== Co-phylog ====
This method searches for so-called structures that are defined as pairs of k-mer matches between two DNA sequences that are one position apart in both sequences. The two k-mer matches are called the context, the position between them is called the object. Co-phylog then defines the distance between two sequences the fraction of such structures for which the two nucleotides in the object are different. The approach can be applied to unassembled sequencing reads.

==== andi ====
andi estimates phylogenetic distances between genomic sequences based on ungapped local alignments that are flanked by maximal exact word matches. Such word matches can be efficiently found using suffix arrays. The gapfree alignments between the exact word matches are then used to estimate phylogenetic distances between genome sequences. The resulting distance estimates are accurate for up to around 0.6 substitutions per position.

==== Filtered Spaced-Word Matches (FSWM) ====
FSWM uses a pre-defined binary pattern P representing so-called match positions and don't-care positions. For a pair of input DNA sequences, it then searches for spaced-word matches w.r.t. P, i.e. for local gap-free alignments with matching nucleotides at the match positions of P and possible mismatches at the don't-care positions. Spurious low-scoring spaced-word matches are discarded, evolutionary distances between the input sequences are estimated based on the nucleotides aligned to each other at the don't-care positions of the remaining, homologous spaced-word matches. FSWM has been adapted to estimate distances based on unassembled NGS reads, this version of the program is called Read-SpaM.

==== Prot-SpaM ====
Prot-SpaM (Proteome-based Spaced-word Matches) is an implementation of the FSWM algorithm for partial or whole proteome sequences.

==== Multi-SpaM ====
Multi-SpaM (MultipleSpaced-word Matches) is an approach to genome-based phylogeny reconstruction that extends the FSWM idea to multiple sequence comparison. Given a binary pattern P of match positions and don't-care positions, the program searches for P-blocks, i.e. local gap-free four-way alignments with matching nucleotides at the match positions of P and possible mismatches at the don't-care positions. Such four-way alignments are randomly sampled from a set of input genome sequences. For each P-block, an unrooted tree topology is calculated using RAxML. The program Quartet MaxCut is then used to calculate a supertree from these trees.

=== Methods based on information theory ===
Information Theory has provided successful methods for alignment-free sequence analysis and comparison. The existing applications of information theory include global and local characterization of DNA, RNA and proteins, estimating genome entropy to motif and region classification. It also holds promise in gene mapping, next-generation sequencing analysis and metagenomics.

==== Base–base correlation (BBC) ====
Base–base correlation (BBC) converts the genome sequence into a unique 16-dimensional numeric vector using the following equation,

$$T_{ij}(K) = \sum_{\ell=1}^K P_{ij}(\ell) \cdot \log_2 \left ( \frac{P_{ij}(\ell)}{P_i P_j} \right)$$

The $P_i$ and $P_j$ denotes the probabilities of bases i and j in the genome. The $P_{ij}(\ell)$ indicates the probability of bases i and j at distance ℓ in the genome. The parameter K indicates the maximum distance between the bases i and j. The variation in the values of 16 parameters reflect variation in the genome content and length.

==== Information correlation and partial information correlation (IC-PIC) ====
IC-PIC (information correlation and partial information correlation) based method employs the base correlation property of DNA sequence. IC and PIC were calculated using following formulas,

$$IC_\ell = -2 \sum_i P_i \log_2 P_i + \sum_{ij} P_{ij} (\ell) \log_2 P_{ij} (\ell)$$

$$PIC_{ij} (\ell) = (P_{ij} (\ell) - P_i P_j (\ell))^2$$

The final vector is obtained as follows:

$$V = {IC_\ell \over PIC_{ij} (\ell)} \text{ where } \ell \isin \left \{ \ell_0, \ell_0 + 1, \ldots, \ell_0 + n \right \},$$

which defines the range of distance between bases.

The pairwise distance between sequences is calculated using Euclidean distance measure. The distance matrix thus obtained can be used to construct phylogenetic tree using clustering algorithms like neighbor-joining, UPGMA, etc..

==== Compression ====
Examples are effective approximations to Kolmogorov complexity, for example Lempel-Ziv complexity. In general compression-based methods use the mutual information between the sequences. This is expressed in conditional Kolmogorov complexity, that is, the length of the shortest self-delimiting program required to generate a string given the prior knowledge of the other string. This measure has a relation to measuring k-words in a sequence, as they can be easily used to generate the sequence. It is sometimes a computationally intensive method. The theoretic basis for the Kolmogorov complexity approach was laid by Bennett, Gacs, Li, Vitanyi, and Zurek (1998) by proposing the information distance. The Kolmogorov complexity being incomputable it was approximated by compression algorithms. The better they compress the better they are. Li, Badger, Chen, Kwong,, Kearney, and Zhang (2001) used a non-optimal but normalized form of this approach, and the optimal normalized form by Li, Chen, Li, Ma, and Vitanyi (2003) appeared in and more extensively and proven by Cilibrasi and Vitanyi (2005) in. Otu and Sayood (2003) used the Lempel-Ziv complexity method to construct five different distance measures for phylogenetic tree construction.

==== Context modeling compression ====
In the context modeling complexity the next-symbol predictions, of one or more statistical models, are combined or competing to yield a prediction that is based on events recorded in the past. The algorithmic information content derived from each symbol prediction can be used to compute algorithmic information profiles with a time proportional to the length of the sequence. The process has been applied to DNA sequence analysis.

=== Methods based on graphical representation ===
==== Iterated maps ====
The use of iterated maps for sequence analysis was first introduced by HJ Jefferey in 1990 when he proposed to apply the Chaos Game to map genomic sequences into a unit square. That report coined the procedure as Chaos Game Representation (CGR). However, only 3 years later this approach was first dismissed as a projection of a Markov transition table by N Goldman. This objection was overruled by the end of that decade when the opposite was found to be the case – that CGR bijectively maps Markov transition is into a fractal, order-free (degree-free) representation. The realization that iterated maps provide a bijective map between the symbolic space and numeric space led to the identification of a variety of alignment-free approaches to sequence comparison and characterization. These developments were reviewed in late 2013 by JS Almeida in. A number of web apps such as https://github.com/usm/usm.github.com/wiki, are available to demonstrate how to encode and compare arbitrary symbolic sequences in a manner that takes full advantage of modern MapReduce distribution developed for cloud computing.

== Comparison of alignment based and alignment-free methods ==
Alignment-based methods	Alignment-free methods
These methods assume that homologous regions are contiguous (with gaps)	Does not assume such contiguity of homologous regions
Computes all possible pairwise comparisons of sequences; hence computationally expensive	Based on occurrences of sub-sequences; composition; computationally inexpensive, can be memory-intensive
Well-established approach in phylogenomics	Relatively recent and application in phylogenomics is limited; needs further testing for robustness and scalability
Requires substitution/evolutionary models	Less dependent on substitution/evolutionary models
Sensitive to stochastic sequence variation, recombination, horizontal (or lateral) genetic transfer, rate heterogeneity and sequences of varied lengths, especially when similarity lies in the "twilight zone"	Less sensitive to stochastic sequence variation, recombination, horizontal (or lateral) genetic transfer, rate heterogeneity and sequences of varied lengths
Best practice uses inference algorithms with complexity at least O(n^{2}); less time-efficient	Inference algorithms typically O(n^{2}) or less; more time-efficient
Heuristic in nature; statistical significance of how alignment scores relate to homology is difficult to assess	Exact solutions; statistical significance of the sequence distances (and degree of similarity) can be readily assessed
Relies on dynamic programming (computationally expensive) to find alignment that has optimal score.	side-steps computational expensive dynamic programming by indexing word counts or positions in fractal space.

== Applications of alignment-free methods ==
- Molecular phylogenetics
- Metagenomics
- Next generation sequence data analysis
- Epigenomics
- Barcoding of species
- Population genetics
- Horizontal gene transfer
- Sero/genotyping of viruses
- Allergenicity prediction
- SNP discovery
- Recombination detection

== See also ==
- Sequence analysis
- Multiple sequence alignment
- Phylogenomics
- Bioinformatics
- Metagenomics
- Next-generation sequencing
- Population genetics
- SNPs
- Recombination detection program
- Genome skimming
