= Boudabousia liubingyangii =

Scientific classification
- Domain: Bacteria
- Kingdom: Bacillati
- Phylum: Actinomycetota
- Class: Actinomycetia
- Order: Actinomycetales
- Family: Actinomycetaceae
- Genus: Boudabousia
- Species: B. liubingyangii

Binomial name
- Boudabousia liubingyangii (Meng et al. 2017) Yang et al. 2021

Type strain
- VUL4_1

Synonyms
- Actinomyces liubingyangii

Species of bacterium

Boudabousia liubingyangii is a Gram-positive and non-spore-forming bacterium from the genus of Boudabousia which has been isolated from rectal swabs of the vultures Gypaetus barbatus.
