= Schaalia turicensis =

Scientific classification
- Domain: Bacteria
- Kingdom: Bacillati
- Phylum: Actinomycetota
- Class: Actinomycetes
- Order: Actinomycetales
- Family: Actinomycetaceae
- Genus: Schaalia
- Species: S. turicensis

Binomial name
- Schaalia turicensis (Johnson et al. 1990) Nouioui et al. 2018

Synonyms
- Actinomyces turicensis Wüst et al. 1995

Species of bacterium

Schaalia turicensis (formerly Actinomyces turicensis) is a gram-positive, rod-shaped bacterium found in the flora of the oral cavity, gut, skin, and female urogenital tract. S. turicensis is an important human pathogen of soft tissue infections in the lower body.

S. turicensis is a facultative anaerobe, growing in air and CO_{2} conditions. The bacterium produces small translucent colonies on sheep blood agar and may be confused for other commensal bacteria such as non-hemolytic Streptococci.
