= Arcanobacterium phocae =

Scientific classification
- Domain: Bacteria
- Kingdom: Bacillati
- Phylum: Actinomycetota
- Class: Actinomycetes
- Order: Actinomycetales
- Family: Actinomycetaceae
- Genus: Arcanobacterium
- Species: A. phocae

Binomial name
- Arcanobacterium phocae Pascual Ramos et al. 1997

Species of bacterium

Arcanobacterium phocae is a bacterial species. It is pathogenic for some sea mammals.
