= Gleimia coleocanis =

Scientific classification
- Domain: Bacteria
- Kingdom: Bacillati
- Phylum: Actinomycetota
- Class: Actinomycetia
- Order: Actinomycetales
- Family: Actinomycetaceae
- Genus: Gleimia
- Species: G. coleocanis

Binomial name
- Gleimia coleocanis (Hoyles et al. 2002) Nouioui et al. 2018

Type strain
- CCUG 41708

Synonyms
- Actinomyces coleocanis

Species of bacterium

Gleimia coleocanis is a bacterium from the genus of Gleimia which has been isolated from the vagina of a dog.
