= Boudabousia tangfeifanii =

Scientific classification
- Domain: Bacteria
- Kingdom: Bacillati
- Phylum: Actinomycetota
- Class: Actinomycetia
- Order: Actinomycetales
- Family: Actinomycetaceae
- Genus: Boudabousia
- Species: B. tangfeifanii

Binomial name
- Boudabousia tangfeifanii (Meng et al. 2018) Yang et al. 2021

Type strain
- VUL4_3

Synonyms
- Actinomyces tangfeifanii

Species of bacterium

Boudabousia tangfeifanii is a Gram-positive and non-spore-forming bacterium from the genus of Boudabousia which has been isolated from a rectal swabs of a vultures (Aegypius monachus).
