= Flaviflexus massiliensis =

Scientific classification
- Domain: Bacteria
- Kingdom: Bacillati
- Phylum: Actinomycetota
- Class: Actinomycetia
- Order: Actinomycetales
- Family: Actinomycetaceae
- Genus: Flaviflexus
- Species: F. massiliensis

Binomial name
- Flaviflexus massiliensis Traore et al. 2016

Type strain
- SIT4

Species of bacterium

Flaviflexus massiliensis is a bacterium from the genus of Flaviflexus which has been isolated from the human gut.
