= Gleimia europaea =

Scientific classification
- Domain: Bacteria
- Kingdom: Bacillati
- Phylum: Actinomycetota
- Class: Actinomycetes
- Order: Actinomycetales
- Family: Actinomycetaceae
- Genus: Gleimia
- Species: G. europaea

Binomial name
- Gleimia europaea (Funke et al. 1997) Nouioui et al. 2018

Synonyms
- Actinomyces europae Actinomyces europaeus

Species of bacterium

Gleimia europaea is a bacterium from the genus Gleimia. Gleimia europaea can cause cases of bacteraemia in very rare cases. Gleimia europaea is formerly known as Actinomyces europaeus. It comes from the domain of gram-positive actinobacteria.
