= Mannosylglycerate hydrolase =

Class of enzymes

Identifiers
- EC no.: 3.2.1.170

Databases
- BRENDA: enzyme data
- ExPASy: NiceZyme view
- KEGG: enzyme entry
- MetaCyc: metabolic pathway
- Rhea: reactions
- PDB structures: RCSB PDB PDBe PDBsum
Search
- PMC: articles
- PubMed: articles
- NCBI: proteins

Mannosylglycerate hydrolase (EC 3.2.1.170, 2-O-(6-phospho-mannosyl)-D-glycerate hydrolase, alpha-mannosidase, mngB (gene)) is an enzyme with systematic name 2-O-(6-phospho-alpha-D-mannosyl)-D-glycerate acylhydrolase. It catalyses the following chemical reaction

2-(α-D-mannosyl)-D-glyceric acid
H_{2}O
mannose
+
D-glyceric acid

The enzyme characterised from Escherichia coli removes the mannose glycoside unit from 2-(α-D-mannosyl)-D-glyceric acid, to give α-D-mannose and D-glyceric acid. The reaction in part of the mannosylglycerate degradation pathway in some extremophiles. The crystal structure of the enzyme from Thermus thermophilus has been determined. Evolution of the genes encoding this enzyme in red algae have been studied.
