= Flaviflexus salsibiostraticola =

Scientific classification
- Domain: Bacteria
- Kingdom: Bacillati
- Phylum: Actinomycetota
- Class: Actinomycetia
- Order: Actinomycetales
- Family: Actinomycetaceae
- Genus: Flaviflexus
- Species: F. salsibiostraticola

Binomial name
- Flaviflexus salsibiostraticola Jin et al. 2014

Type strain
- EBR4-1-2

Species of bacterium

Flaviflexus salsibiostraticola is a Gram-positive, non-spore-forming, aerobic, cocci-shaped and non-motile bacterium from the genus of Flaviflexus which has been isolated from a biofilm reactor from Korea.
