= Boudabousia marimammalium =

Scientific classification
- Domain: Bacteria
- Kingdom: Bacillati
- Phylum: Actinomycetota
- Class: Actinomycetia
- Order: Actinomycetales
- Family: Actinomycetaceae
- Genus: Boudabousia
- Species: B. marimammalium

Binomial name
- Boudabousia marimammalium (Hoyles et al. 2001) Nouioui et al. 2018

Type strain
- CCUG 41710

Synonyms
- Actinomyces marimamalium Actinomyces marimammalium

Species of bacterium

Boudabousia marimammalium is a bacterium from the genus of Boudabousia.
