= Manba =

Manba may refer to:

- Beta-mannosidase, an enzyme
- A branch of the alternative fashion trend Ganguro
