= Flaviflexus huanghaiensis =

Scientific classification
- Domain: Bacteria
- Kingdom: Bacillati
- Phylum: Actinomycetota
- Class: Actinomycetia
- Order: Actinomycetales
- Family: Actinomycetaceae
- Genus: Flaviflexus
- Species: F. huanghaiensis

Binomial name
- Flaviflexus huanghaiensis Du et al. 2013

Type strain
- H5

Species of bacterium

Flaviflexus huanghaiensis is a Gram-positive and non-motile bacterium from the genus of Flaviflexus which has been isolated from sediments from the coast of Qingdao.
