= Schaalia georgiae =

Scientific classification
- Domain: Bacteria
- Kingdom: Bacillati
- Phylum: Actinomycetota
- Class: Actinomycetes
- Order: Actinomycetales
- Family: Actinomycetaceae
- Genus: Schaalia
- Species: S. georgiae

Binomial name
- Schaalia georgiae (Johnson et al. 1990) Nouioui et al. 2018

Synonyms
- Actinomyces georgiae Johnson et al. 1990

Species of bacterium

Schaalia georgiae is a species of Gram-positive bacteria from the genus Schaalia. It is a part of the human periodontal flora.
