= Flaviflexus equikiangi =

Scientific classification
- Domain: Bacteria
- Kingdom: Bacillati
- Phylum: Actinomycetota
- Class: Actinomycetia
- Order: Actinomycetales
- Family: Actinomycetaceae
- Genus: Flaviflexus
- Species: F. equikiangi

Binomial name
- Flaviflexus equikiangi Yang et al. 2022

Type strain
- dk850

Species of bacterium

Flaviflexus equikiangi is a Gram-positive, non-spore-forming and cocci-shaped bacterium from the genus of Flaviflexus which has been isolated from the feces of a Kiang.
