= Glycoside hydrolase family 2 =

Enzyme group

Glycosyl hydrolases family 2, sugar binding domain
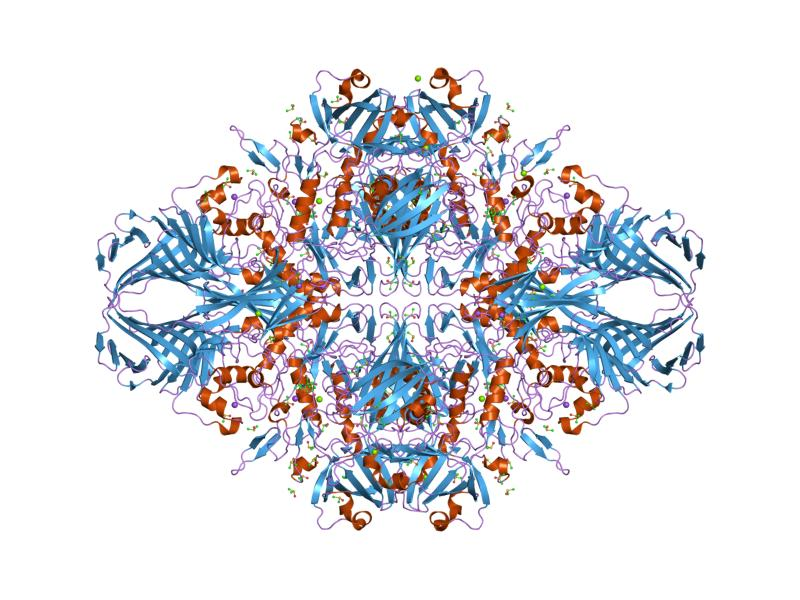
- e. coli (lacz) beta-galactosidase-trapped 2-deoxy-galactosyl enzyme intermediate

Identifiers
- Symbol: Glyco_hydro_2_N
- Pfam: PF02837
- Pfam clan: CL0202
- InterPro: IPR006104
- PROSITE: PDOC00531
- SCOP2: 1bgl / SCOPe / SUPFAM
- CAZy: GH2
Available protein structures:
- PDB: IPR006104 PF02837 (ECOD; PDBsum)
- AlphaFold: IPR006104; PF02837

Glycosyl hydrolases family 2
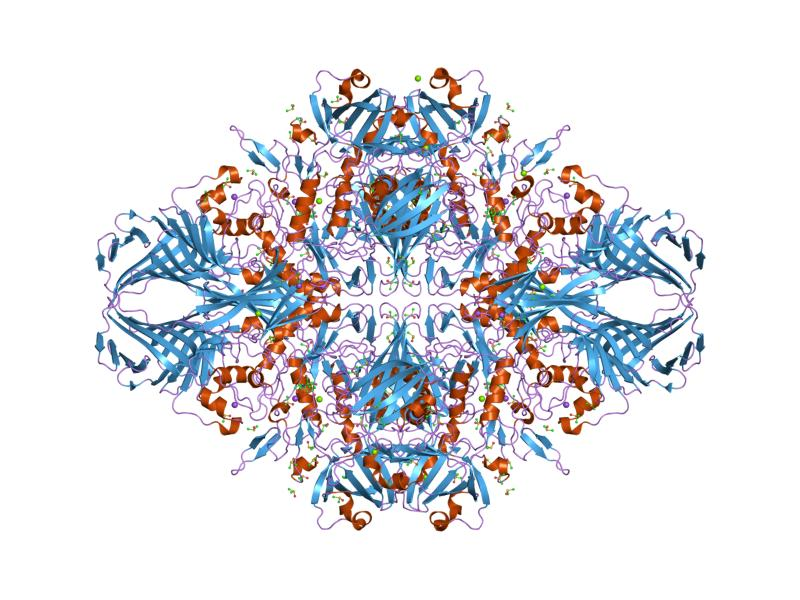
- e. coli (lacz) beta-galactosidase-trapped 2-deoxy-galactosyl enzyme intermediate

Identifiers
- Symbol: Glyco_hydro_2
- Pfam: PF00703
- InterPro: IPR006102
- PROSITE: PDOC00531
- SCOP2: 1bgl / SCOPe / SUPFAM
- CAZy: GH2
Available protein structures:
- PDB: IPR006102 PF00703 (ECOD; PDBsum)
- AlphaFold: IPR006102; PF00703

Glycosyl hydrolases family 2, TIM barrel domain
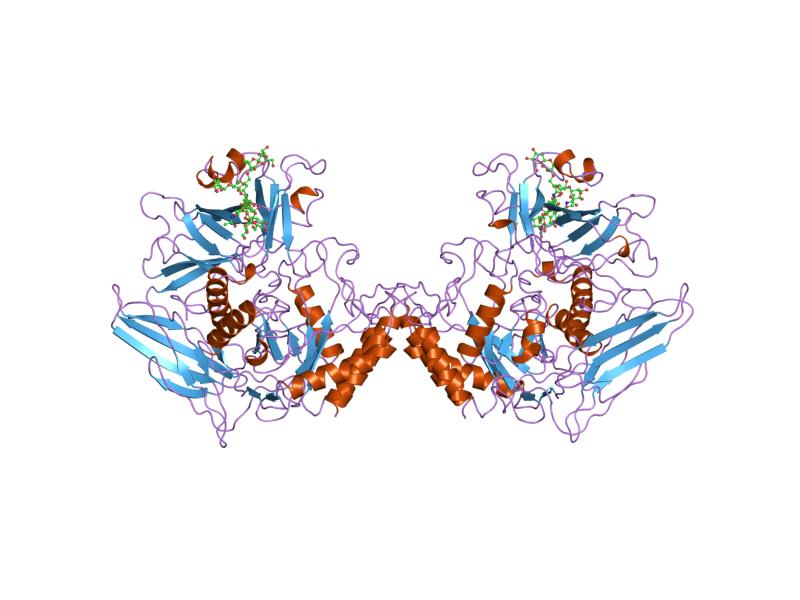
- human beta-glucuronidase at 2.6 a resolution

Identifiers
- Symbol: Glyco_hydro_2_C
- Pfam: PF02836
- Pfam clan: CL0058
- InterPro: IPR006103
- PROSITE: PDOC00531
- SCOP2: 1bgl / SCOPe / SUPFAM
- CAZy: GH2
Available protein structures:
- PDB: IPR006103 PF02836 (ECOD; PDBsum)
- AlphaFold: IPR006103; PF02836

In molecular biology, Glycoside hydrolase family 2 is a family of glycoside hydrolases EC 3.2.1., which are a widespread group of enzymes that hydrolyse the glycosidic bond between two or more carbohydrates, or between a carbohydrate and a non-carbohydrate moiety. A classification system for glycoside hydrolases, based on sequence similarity, has led to the definition of >100 different families. This classification is available on the CAZy web site, and also discussed at CAZypedia, an online encyclopedia of carbohydrate active enzymes.

Glycoside hydrolase family 2 comprises enzymes with several known activities: beta-galactosidase (EC 3.2.1.23); beta-mannosidase (EC 3.2.1.25); beta-glucuronidase (EC 3.2.1.31). These enzymes contain a conserved glutamic acid residue which has been shown, in Escherichia coli lacZ (P00722), to be the general acid/base catalyst in the active site of the enzyme.

The catalytic domain of Beta-galactosidases have a TIM barrel core surrounded several other largely beta domains. The sugar binding domain of these proteins has a jelly-roll fold. These enzymes also include an immunoglobulin-like beta-sandwich domain.
