= Velmanase alfa =

Clinical data
- Trade names: Lamzede
- Other names: Velmanase alfa-tycv
- AHFS/Drugs.com: Micromedex Detailed Consumer Information
- MedlinePlus: a623015
- License data: US DailyMed: Velmanase alfa
- Routes of administration: Intravenous
- ATC code: A16AB15 (WHO)

Legal status
- Legal status: AU: S4 (Prescription only); US: ℞-only; EU: Rx-only

Identifiers
- CAS Number: 1492823-75-2
- DrugBank: DB12374
- UNII: M91TG242P2
- KEGG: D11024

Velmanase alfa, sold under the brand name Lamzede, is a medication used for the treatment of alpha-mannosidosis. Velmanase alfa is a recombinant human lysosomal alpha-mannosidase.

The most common adverse reactions include hypersensitivity reactions including anaphylaxis, a severe, potentially life-threatening allergic reaction.

Velmanase alfa was approved for medical use in the European Union in March 2018, and in the United States in February 2023. Velmanase alfa is the first enzyme replacement therapy approved in the US for the treatment of the non-central nervous system manifestations of alpha-mannosidosis. The US Food and Drug Administration (FDA) considers it to be a first-in-class medication.

== Medical uses ==
Velmanase alfa is indicated for the treatment of the non-central nervous system manifestations of alpha-mannosidosis.

Alpha-mannosidosis is a rare genetic lysosomal storage disorder. The symptoms of the disorder vary, but often include mild to moderate intellectual disability, hearing loss, weakened immune system, distinctive facial features (e.g., a large head, prominent forehead, and protruding jaw), skeletal abnormalities, and muscle weakness. Alpha-mannosidosis is caused by genetic changes in the MAN2B1 gene, which codes for the lysosomal alpha-mannosidase enzyme. Mutations of the MAN2B1 gene result in the lack of production of the alpha-D-mannosidase enzyme or the production of a defective, inactive form of the enzyme. Alpha-mannosidosis affects about 1 in every 500,000 people worldwide.

== History ==
The effectiveness of velmanase alfa was evaluated in participants with alpha-mannosidosis in a phase III multicenter, randomized, double-blind, placebo-controlled, parallel group study. The trial evaluated the efficacy of velmanase alfa over 52 weeks at a dose of 1 mg/kg given weekly as an intravenous infusion. A total of 25 participants were enrolled (14 males, 11 females), including 13 adult participants (age range: ≥18 to 35 years; mean: 25 years) and 12 pediatric participants (age range: ≥6 to <18 years; mean: 11 years); all participants were White. Fifteen participants (8 adult and 7 pediatric) received velmanase alfa and 10 participants (5 adult and 5 pediatric) received placebo.

== Society and culture ==
=== Names ===
Velmanase alfa is the international nonproprietary name.
