= Varibaculum =

Scientific classification
- Domain: Bacteria
- Kingdom: Bacillati
- Phylum: Actinomycetota
- Class: Actinomycetes
- Order: Actinomycetales
- Family: Actinomycetaceae
- Genus: Varibaculum; Hall et al. 2003

Type species
- Varibaculum cambriense corrig. Hall et al. 2003

Species
- V. anthropi Glaeser et al. 2017; V. cambriense corrig. Hall et al. 2003; V. massiliense Niang et al. 2021; V. timonense Lo et al. 2021; V. vaginae Fall et al. 2021

Genus of bacteria

Varibaculum is a Gram-positive, facultatively anaerobic, non-spore-forming and non-motile genus of bacteria from the family of Actinomycetaceae.
