= Beta-mannosidosis =

- Other names: Beta-mannosidase deficiency, MANSB
- This condition is autosomal recessive in inheritance
- Specialty: Medical genetics
- Symptoms: Respiratory infections, Hearing loss and Intellectual disability.
- Causes: Mutations in the MANBA gene
- Diagnostic method: Urine test
- Treatment: Based on symptoms

Beta-mannosidosis, also called lysosomal beta-mannosidase deficiency, is a disorder of oligosaccharide metabolism caused by decreased activity of the enzyme beta-mannosidase. This enzyme is coded for by the gene MANBA, located at 4q22-25. Beta-mannosidosis is inherited in an autosomal recessive manner. Affected individuals appear normal at birth, and can have a variable clinical presentation. Infantile onset forms show severe neurodegeneration, while some children have intellectual disability. Hearing loss and angiokeratomas are common features of the disease.

== Symptoms and signs ==
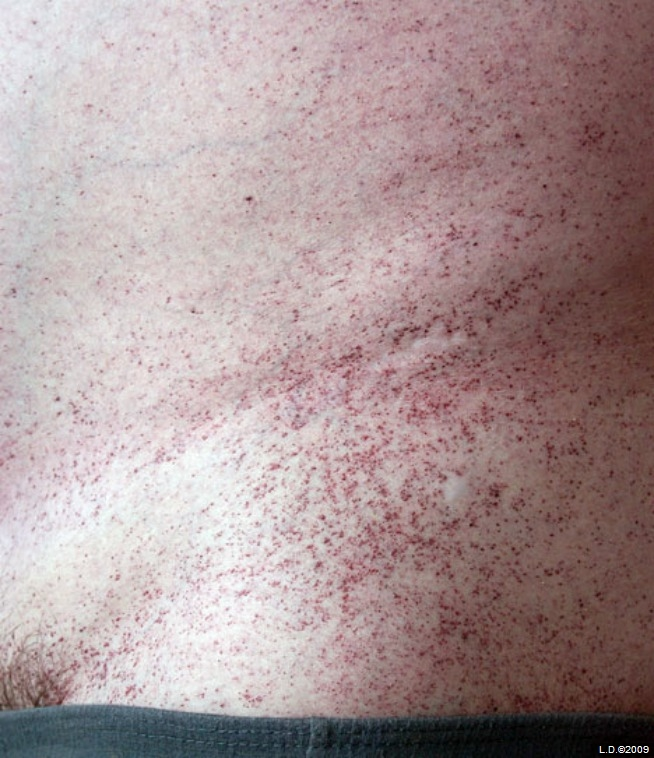
Angiokeratoma

The initial affected individual described in 1986 had a complex phenotype, and was later found to have both beta-mannosidosis and Sanfilippo syndrome. People have been described with a wide spectrum of clinical presentations, from infants and children with intellectual disability to adults who present with isolated skin findings (angiokeratomas).

Most cases are identified in the first year of life with respiratory infections, hearing loss and intellectual disability. Because of its rarity, and non-specific clinical findings, beta-mannosidosis can go undiagnosed until adulthood, where it can present with intellectual disability and behavioral problems, including aggression.

== Cause ==
In terms of causation, several mutations in the MANBA gene are the cause of beta-mannosidosis. The cytogenetic location of the gene is 4q24; furthermore, the condition is inherited in an autosomal recessive manner.

== Mechanism ==
Mannose

Beta-mannosidase function is consistent with it being a lysosomal enzyme catalyzing and thus involved in degradation route for N-linked oligosaccharide moieties (glycoproteins).

== Diagnosis ==
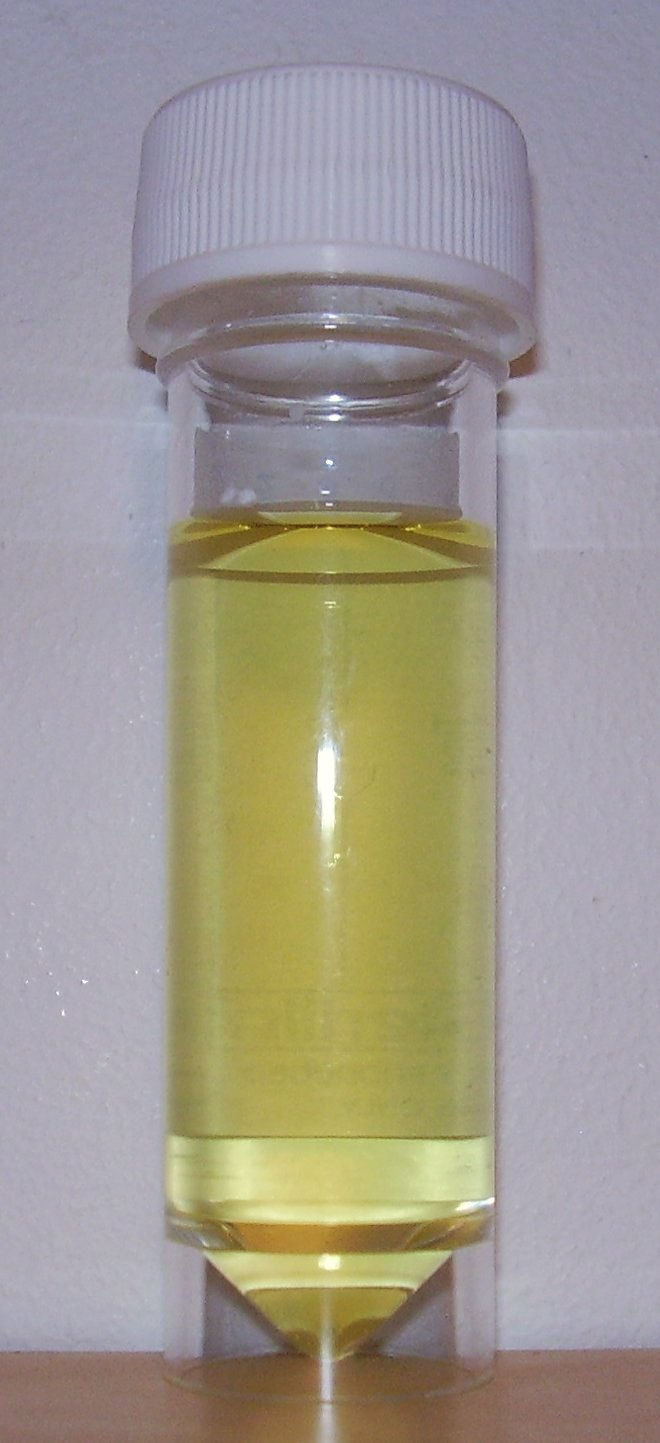
Urine test

A diagnosis of beta-mannosidosis is suspected based on the person's clinical presentation. Urine testing to identify abnormal oligosaccharides is a useful screening test, and enzymatic analysis or molecular testing can be used for confirmation.

=== Differential diagnosis ===
Diagnostic techniques for this condition can be done to offer a differential diagnosis, via lectin histochemistry, to distinguish between alpha-mannosidosis and beta-mannosidosis.

== Treatment ==
There is currently no treatment available; individuals exhibiting muscle weakness or seizures are treated based on symptoms.

== See also ==
- Beta-mannosidase
- The Lost Enzyme Project
