= Fudania jinshanensis =

Scientific classification
- Domain: Bacteria
- Kingdom: Bacillati
- Phylum: Actinomycetota
- Class: Actinomycetia
- Order: Actinomycetales
- Family: Actinomycetaceae
- Genus: Fudania; Zhu et al. 2019
- Species: F. jinshanensis

Binomial name
- Fudania jinshanensis Zhu et al. 2019

Type strain
- 313; CGMCC 4.7453; DSM 106216

Genus of bacteria

Fudania jinshanensis is a gram-positive species of bacteria from the family Actinomycetaceae, which has been isolated from the faeces of an antelope (Pantholops hodgsonii).
