= Schaalia =

Scientific classification
- Domain: Bacteria
- Kingdom: Bacillati
- Phylum: Actinomycetota
- Class: Actinomycetes
- Order: Actinomycetales
- Family: Actinomycetaceae
- Genus: Schaalia; Nouioui et al. 2018

Type species
- Schaalia odontolytica (Batty 1958) Nouioui et al. 2018

Species
- S. canis (Hoyles et al. 2000) Nouioui et al. 2018; S. cardiffensis (Hall et al. 2003) Nouioui et al. 2018; S. funkei (Lawson et al. 2001) Nouioui et al. 2018; S. georgiae (Johnson et al. 1990) Nouioui et al. 2018; S. hyovaginalis (Collins et al. 1993) Nouioui et al. 2018; S. meyeri (Cato et al. 1984) Nouioui et al. 2018; S. naturae (Rao et al. 2012) Nouioui et al. 2018; S. odontolytica (Batty 1958) Nouioui et al. 2018; S. radingae (Wüst et al. 1995) Nouioui et al. 2018; S. suimastitidis (Hoyles et al. 2001) Nouioui et al. 2018; S. turicensis (Wüst et al. 1995) Nouioui et al. 2018; S. vaccimaxillae (Hall et al. 2003) Nouioui et al. 2018

Genus of bacteria

Schaalia is a genus of Gram-positive bacteria in the phylum Actinomycetota. Some members of the genus have been implicated in human disease.
