= Rally for Democracy and Progress =

Rally for Democracy and Progress may refer to:

- Rally for Democracy and Progress (Benin)
- Rally for Democracy and Progress (Chad)
- Rally for Democracy and Progress (Gabon)
- Rally for Democracy and Progress (Mali)
- Rally for Democracy and Progress (Namibia)
- Rally for Democracy and Progress (Niger)

== See also ==
- RDP (disambiguation)
