= Bowdeniella =

Scientific classification
- Domain: Bacteria
- Kingdom: Bacillati
- Phylum: Actinomycetota
- Class: Actinomycetia
- Order: Actinomycetales
- Family: Actinomycetaceae
- Genus: Bowdeniella corrig. Nouioui et al. 2018
- Species: B. nasicola

Binomial name
- Bowdeniella nasicola corrig. (Hall et al. 2003) Nouioui et al. 2018

Type strain
- CCUG 46092; CIP 107668; DSM 19116; R2014

Synonyms
- Genus: Bowdenia Nouioui et al. 2018; Species: Actinomyces nasicola Hall et al. 2003

Genus of bacteria

Bowdeniella is a monotypic genus of bacteria from the family of Actinomycetaceae. This genus only contains one species, Bowdeniella nasicola, which was isolated from a human nose.
