= Buchananella =

Scientific classification
- Domain: Bacteria
- Kingdom: Bacillati
- Phylum: Actinomycetota
- Class: Actinomycetia
- Order: Actinomycetales
- Family: Actinomycetaceae
- Genus: Buchananella; Nouioui et al. 2018
- Species: B. hordeovulneris

Binomial name
- Buchananella hordeovulneris (Buchanan et al. 1984) Nouioui et al. 2018

Type strain
- ATCC 35275; CCUG 32937; CIP 103149; DSM 20732; UCD 81; UCD 81-332-9

Synonyms
- Actinomyces hordeovulneris Buchanan et al. 1984

Genus of bacteria

Buchananella hordeovulneris is a species of bacteria from the family Actinomycetaceae. It is the only species in the genus Buchananella .
