= Boudabousia =

Scientific classification
- Domain: Bacteria
- Kingdom: Bacillati
- Phylum: Actinomycetota
- Class: Actinomycetes
- Order: Actinomycetales
- Family: Actinomycetaceae
- Genus: Boudabousia; Nouioui et al. 2018

Type species
- Boudabousia marimammalium (Hoyles et al. 2001) Nouioui et al. 2018

Species
- B. liubingyangii (Meng et al. 2017) Yang et al. 2021; B. marimammalium (Hoyles et al. 2001) Nouioui et al. 2018; B. tangfeifanii (Meng et al. 2018) Yang et al. 2021

Genus of bacteria

Boudabousia is a genus of bacteria from the family Actinomycetaceae.
