= Flaviflexus =

Scientific classification
- Domain: Bacteria
- Kingdom: Bacillati
- Phylum: Actinomycetota
- Class: Actinomycetes
- Order: Actinomycetales
- Family: Actinomycetaceae
- Genus: Flaviflexus; Du et al. 2013

Type species
- Flaviflexus huanghaiensis Du et al. 2013

Species
- F. ciconiae Lee et al. 2020; "F. equikiangi" Yang et al. 2022; F. huanghaiensis Du et al. 2013; "F. massiliensis" Traore et al. 2016; F. salsibiostraticola Jin et al. 2014

Genus of bacteria

Flaviflexus is a genus of bacteria from the family Actinomycetaceae. Species of Flaviflexus have antimicrobial activity.
