= Winkia neuii =

Scientific classification
- Domain: Bacteria
- Kingdom: Bacillati
- Phylum: Actinomycetota
- Class: Actinomycetes
- Order: Actinomycetales
- Family: Actinomycetaceae
- Genus: Winkia; Nouioui et al. 2018
- Species: W. neuii

Binomial name
- Winkia neuii (Funke et al. 1994) Nouioui et al. 2018

Type strain
- 97/90; ATCC 51847; CCUG 32252; CIP 104015; DSM 8576

Synonyms
- Actinomyces neuii Funke et al. 1994

Species of bacterium

Winkia neuii is a species of Gram-positive, rod-shaped bacteria within the genus Winkia. It is known to live commensally on and within humans as part of normal, healthy microbiota of the human vagina
