= MAN2B2 =

Protein-coding gene in the species Homo sapiens

Identifiers
- Aliases: MAN2B2, mannosidase alpha class 2B member 2, EpMAN
- External IDs: MGI: 1195262; GeneCards: MAN2B2
Enzyme activity
EC #	BRENDA	ExPASy	KEGG	MetaCyc
3.2.1.24	↗	↗	↗	↗

Gene location (Human)
Chr.	Chromosome 4 (human)
Band	4p16.1	Start	6,575,189 bp
Band	4p16.1	End	6,623,362 bp

Gene location (Mouse)
Chr.	Chromosome 5 (mouse)
Band	5|5 B3	Start	36,964,265 bp
Band	5|5 B3	End	36,987,997 bp
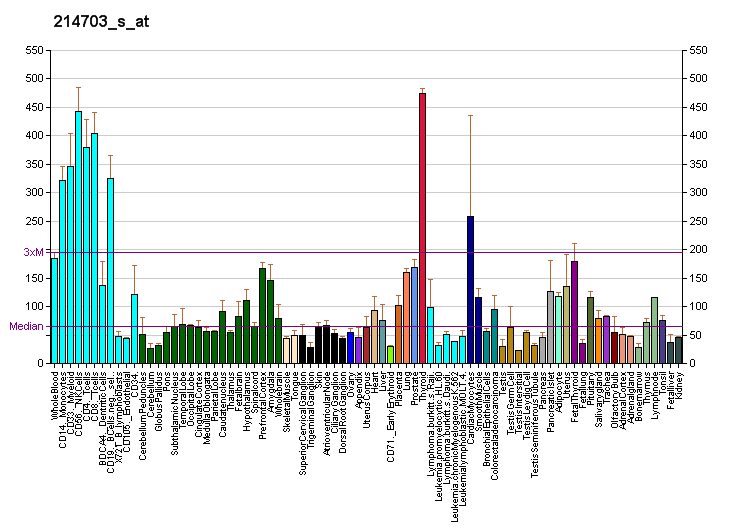
RNA expression pattern
Bgee	Human / Mouse (ortholog); Top expressed in: tendon of biceps brachii; stromal cell of endometrium; Descending thoracic aorta; right coronary artery; ascending aorta; decidua; parotid gland; synovial joint; popliteal artery; tibial arteries / Top expressed in: spermatocyte; spermatid; granulocyte; epithelium of small intestine; yolk sac; stroma of bone marrow; seminiferous tubule; tail of embryo; ileum; primary visual cortex; More reference expression data
BioGPS	More reference expression data
Gene ontology
Molecular function	catalytic activity; hydrolase activity; alpha-mannosidase activity; metal ion binding; hydrolase activity, acting on glycosyl bonds; carbohydrate binding; mannan endo-1,6-alpha-mannosidase activity
Cellular component	extracellular region; extracellular exosome; lysosomal lumen; extracellular space; vacuolar membrane
Biological process	metabolism; mannose metabolic process; protein deglycosylation; oligosaccharide catabolic process; carbohydrate metabolic process
Sources:Amigo / QuickGO
Orthologs
Databases	NCBI: entry; OMA: entry
Species	Human	Mouse
Entrez	23324	17160
Ensembl	ENSG00000013288	ENSMUSG00000029119
UniProt	Q9Y2E5	O54782
RefSeq (mRNA)	NM_001292038; NM_015274	NM_008550
RefSeq (protein)	NP_001278967; NP_056089	NP_032576
Location (UCSC)	Chr 4: 6.58 – 6.62 Mb	Chr 5: 36.96 – 36.99 Mb
PubMed search
- Wikidata
View/Edit Human	View/Edit Mouse

Epididymis-specific alpha-mannosidase is an enzyme that in humans is encoded by the MAN2B2 gene. It has also been called mannosidase alpha class 2B member and core-specific lysosomal alpha-1,6-Mannosidase.
