= Mobiluncus mulieris =

Scientific classification
- Domain: Bacteria
- Kingdom: Bacillati
- Phylum: Actinomycetota
- Class: Actinomycetes
- Order: Actinomycetales
- Family: Actinomycetaceae
- Genus: Mobiluncus
- Species: M. mulieris

Binomial name
- Mobiluncus mulieris Spiegel and Roberts 1984

Synonyms
- Falcivibrio grandis Hammann et al. 1984

Species of bacterium

Mobiluncus mulieris is a curved, anaerobic bacteria from the vagina of women. Its cells are motile and rod-shaped, having multiple subpolar flagella and multilayered gram-variable cell walls. Its type strain is ATCC 35243. It is often associated with vaginal infections.
