= Pauljensenia =

Scientific classification
- Domain: Bacteria
- Kingdom: Bacillati
- Phylum: Actinomycetota
- Class: Actinomycetes
- Order: Actinomycetales
- Family: Actinomycetaceae
- Genus: Pauljensenia; Nouioui et al. 2018
- Species: P. hongkongensis

Binomial name
- Pauljensenia hongkongensis (Woo et al. 2004) Nouioui et al. 2018

Type strain
- CCUG 48484; CIP 107949; DSM 15629; HKU8; LMG 21939

Synonyms
- Actinomyces hongkongensis Woo et al. 2004

Genus of bacteria

Pauljensenia hongkongensis is a Gram-positive, strictly anaerobic and non-spore-forming species of bacteria from the genus Pauljensenia and family Actinomycetaceae.
