= Gleimia =

Scientific classification
- Domain: Bacteria
- Kingdom: Bacillati
- Phylum: Actinomycetota
- Class: Actinomycetes
- Order: Actinomycetales
- Family: Actinomycetaceae
- Genus: Gleimia; Nouioui et al. 2018

Type species
- Gleimia europaea (Funke et al. 1997) Nouioui et al. 2018

Species
- G. coleocanis (Hoyles et al. 2002) Nouioui et al. 2018; G. europaea (Funke et al. 1997) Nouioui et al. 2018; G. hominis (Funke et al. 2010) Nouioui et al. 2018

Genus of bacteria

Gleimia is a genus of bacteria from the family Actinomycetaceae.
