= Arcanobacterium haemolyticum infection =

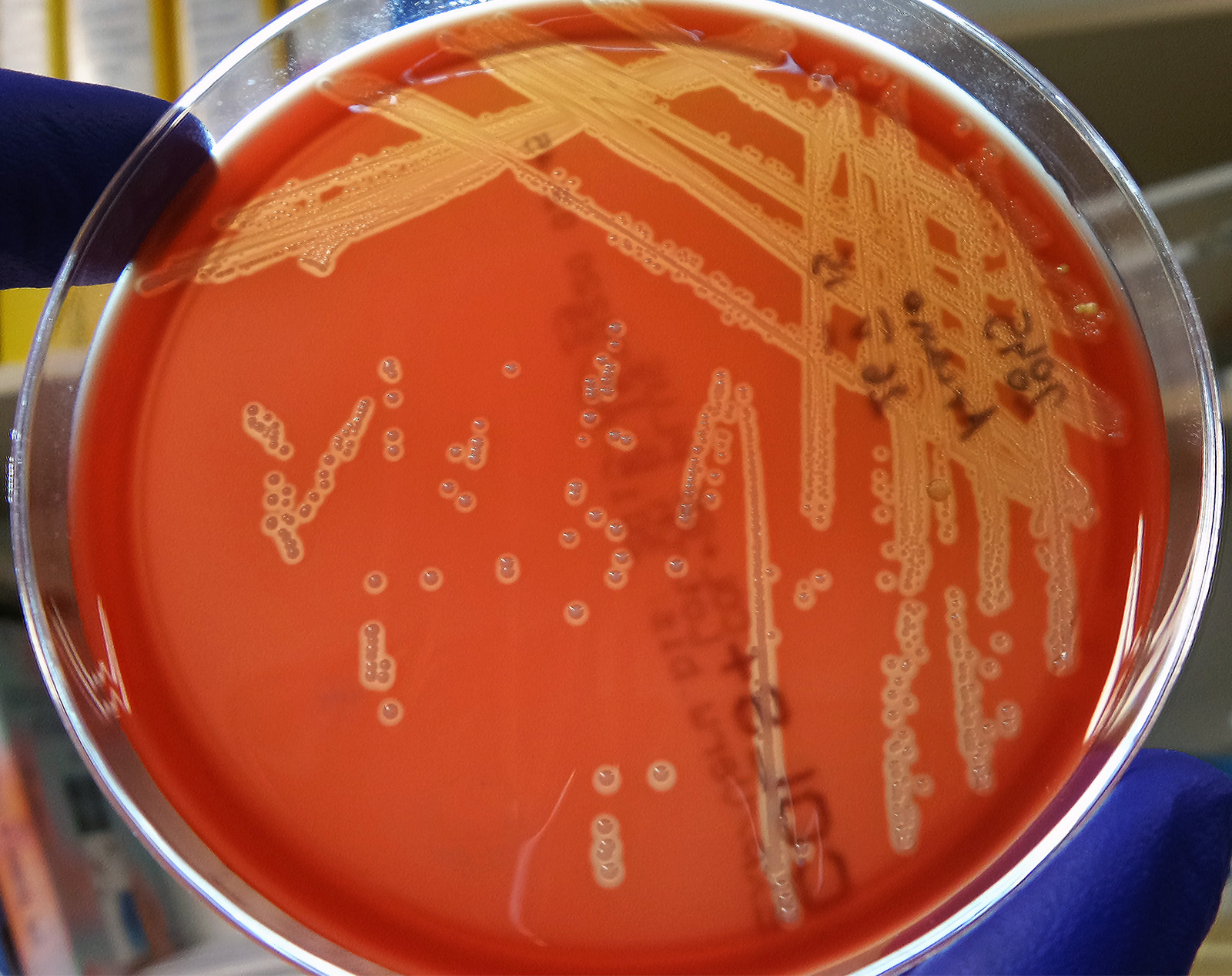
- Arcanobacterium haemolyticum colonies growing on the blood agar
- Specialty: Dermatology

An Arcanobacterium haemolyticum infection is any of several types of infection with the gram-positive bacillus Arcanobacterium haemolyticum. It can cause an acute pharyngitis, and it may cause an exanthem characterized by an erythematous, morbilliform or scarlatiniform eruption involving the trunk and extremities.
