= NADH2 dehydrogenase (ubiquinone) =

NADH2 dehydrogenase (ubiquinone) may refer to:

- NADH dehydrogenase
- NADH:ubiquinone reductase (non-electrogenic)
