= Cytosol alanyl aminopeptidase =

Class of enzymes

Identifiers
- EC no.: 3.4.11.14
- CAS no.: 243859-94-1

Databases
- IntEnz: IntEnz view
- BRENDA: BRENDA entry
- ExPASy: NiceZyme view
- KEGG: KEGG entry
- MetaCyc: metabolic pathway
- PRIAM: profile
- PDB structures: RCSB PDB PDBe PDBsum
Search
- PMC: articles
- PubMed: articles
- NCBI: proteins

Cytosol alanyl aminopeptidase (EC 3.4.11.14, arylamidase, aminopolypeptidase, thiol-activated aminopeptidase, human liver aminopeptidase, puromycin-sensitive aminopeptidase, soluble alanyl aminopeptidase, cytosol aminopeptidase III, alanine aminopeptidase) is an enzyme.

This enzyme catalyses the release of an N-terminal amino acid, preferentially alanine, from a wide range of peptides, amides and arylamides.

This puromycin-sensitive enzyme is a Co^{2+}-activated zinc-sialoglycoprotein.
