= Actinotignum =

Scientific classification
- Domain: Bacteria
- Kingdom: Bacillati
- Phylum: Actinomycetota
- Class: Actinomycetia
- Order: Actinomycetales
- Family: Actinomycetaceae
- Genus: Actinotignum; Yassin et al. 2015

Type species
- Actinotignum schaalii (Lawson et al. 1997) Yassin et al. 2015

Species
- A. sanguinis Yassin et al. 2015; A. schaalii (Lawson et al. 1997) Yassin et al. 2015; "A. timonense" Brahimi et al. 2017; A. urinale (Hall et al. 2003) Yassin et al. 2015

Genus of bacteria

Actinotignum is a bacterial genus in the family Actinomycetaceae.
