= 1,6-alpha-D-mannosidase =

Class of enzymes

Identifiers
- EC no.: 3.2.1.163

Databases
- IntEnz: IntEnz view
- BRENDA: BRENDA entry
- ExPASy: NiceZyme view
- KEGG: KEGG entry
- MetaCyc: metabolic pathway
- PRIAM: profile
- PDB structures: RCSB PDB PDBe PDBsum
Search
- PMC: articles
- PubMed: articles
- NCBI: proteins

In enzymology, a 1,6-alpha-D-mannosidase (EC 3.2.1.163) is an enzyme that catalyzes the chemical reaction of separating the 1,6-linked alpha-D-mannose residues in alpha-D-Manp-(1->6)-D-Manp.

This enzyme belongs to the family of hydrolases, specifically those glycosidases that hydrolyse O- and S-glycosyl compounds. The systematic name of this enzyme class is 1,6-alpha-mannosyl alpha-D-mannohydrolase.
