= Actinobaculum =

Scientific classification
- Domain: Bacteria
- Kingdom: Bacillati
- Phylum: Actinomycetota
- Class: Actinomycetia
- Order: Actinomycetales
- Family: Actinomycetaceae
- Genus: Actinobaculum; Lawson et al. 1997

Type species
- Actinobaculum suis (Wegienek and Reddy 1982) Lawson et al. 1997

Species
- A. massiliense corrig. Greub and Raoult 2006; A. suis (Wegienek and Reddy 1982) Lawson et al. 1997; "Ca. A. timonae" Drancourt et al. 2004

Genus of bacteria

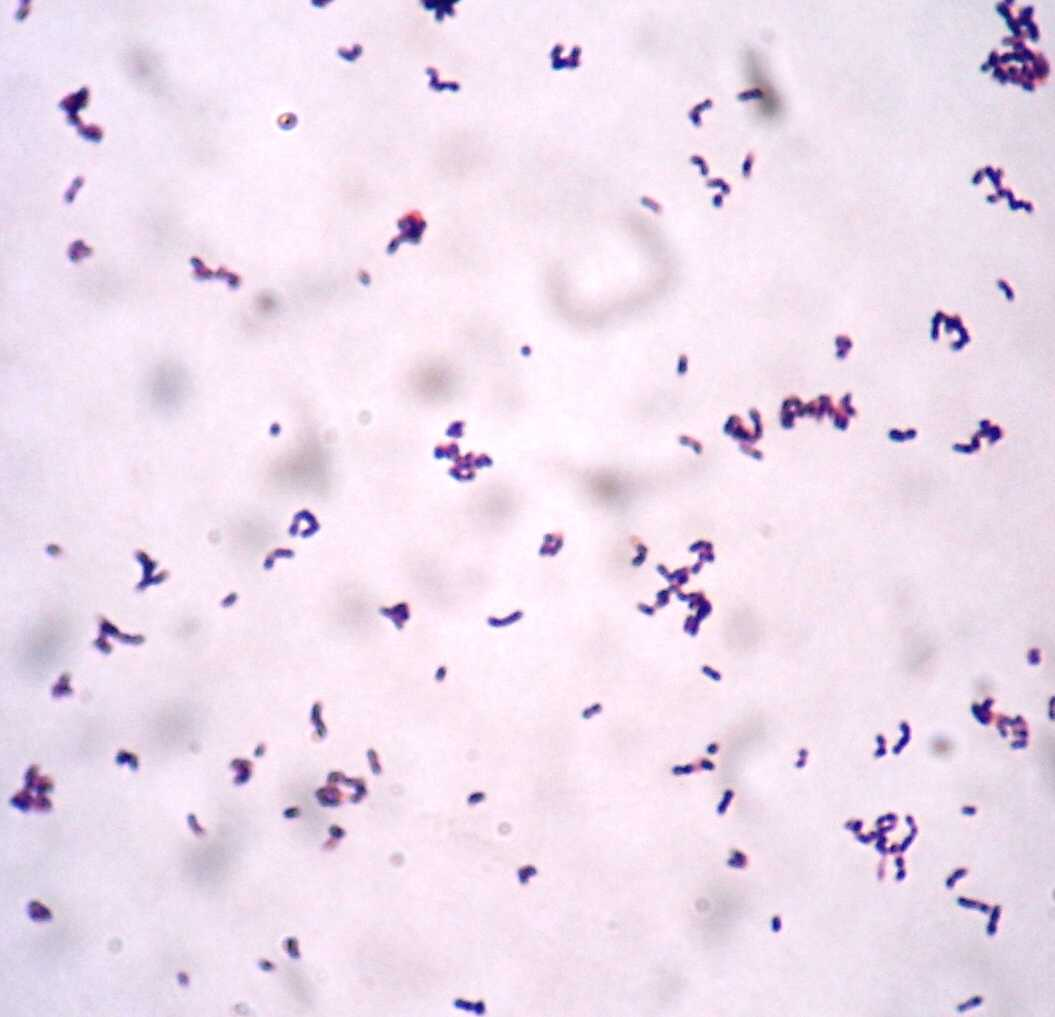
Actinobaculum shaalii

Actinobaculum is a bacterial genus in the family Actinomycetaceae.
