= Trueperella =

Scientific classification
- Domain: Bacteria
- Kingdom: Bacillati
- Phylum: Actinomycetota
- Class: Actinomycetes
- Order: Actinomycetales
- Family: Actinomycetaceae
- Genus: Trueperella; Yassin et al. 2011

Type species
- Trueperella pyogenes (Glage 1903) Yassin et al. 2011

Species
- T. abortisuis (Azuma et al. 2009) Yassin et al. 2011; T. bernardiae (Funke et al. 1995) Yassin et al. 2011; T. bialowiezensis corrig. (Lehnen et al. 2006) Yassin et al. 2011; T. bonasi (Lehnen et al. 2006) Yassin et al. 2011; T. pecoris Schönecker et al. 2021; T. pyogenes (Glage 1903) Yassin et al. 2011

Genus of bacteria

Trueperella is a genus of Gram-positive bacteria in the phylum Actinomycetota. The genus was named in honor of German microbiologist Hans Georg Trüper.
