= Mobiluncus =

Scientific classification
- Domain: Bacteria
- Kingdom: Bacillati
- Phylum: Actinomycetota
- Class: Actinomycetes
- Order: Actinomycetales
- Family: Actinomycetaceae
- Genus: Mobiluncus; Spiegel and Roberts 1984

Species
- M. curtisii Spiegel and Roberts 1984; M. holmesii (Spiegel and Roberts 1984) Nouioui et al. 2018; M. mulieris Spiegel and Roberts 1984; M. porci Wylensek et al. 2021

Synonyms
- Falcivibrio Hammann et al. 1984

Genus of bacteria

Mobiluncus is a genus of Gram-positive, anaerobic, rod-shaped bacteria. These bacteria may be stained either Gram-negative or Gram-variable. However, they are classified as Gram-positive rods due to the fact that they possess a Gram-positive cell wall, lack endotoxin and are sensitive to vancomycin, erythromycin and ampicillin, but resistant to colistin.

These organisms are found in the human vagina, particularly in association with Gardnerella vaginalis in cases of bacterial vaginosis.
