= Α-Mannosidase =

Class of enzymes

α-Mannosidase
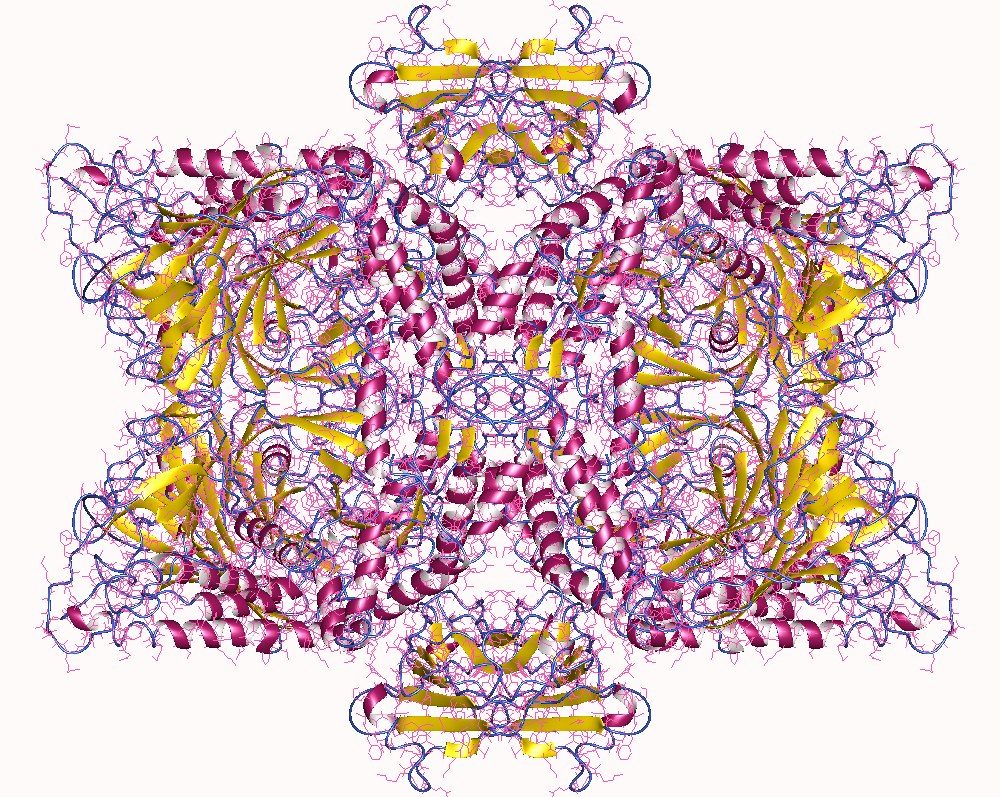
- α-Mannosidase 1, tetramer, Saccharomyces cerevisiae

Identifiers
- EC no.: 3.2.1.24
- CAS no.: 9025-42-7

Databases
- BRENDA: enzyme data
- ExPASy: NiceZyme view
- KEGG: enzyme entry
- MetaCyc: metabolic pathway
- Rhea: reactions
- PDB structures: RCSB PDB PDBe PDBsum
- Gene Ontology: AmiGO / QuickGO
Search
- PMC: articles
- PubMed: articles
- NCBI: proteins

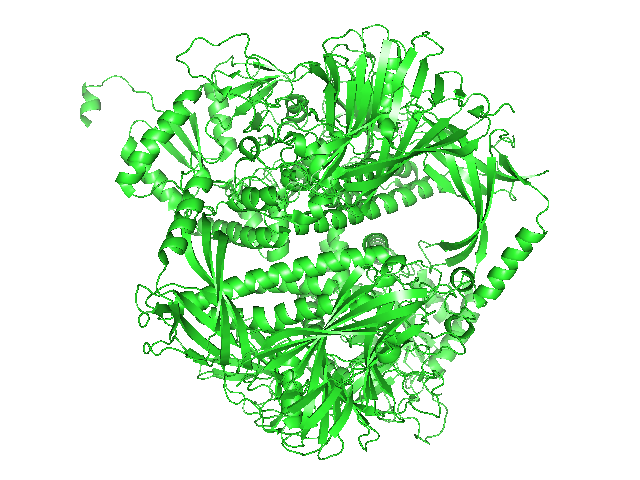
Cartoon depiction of the protein Streptococcus pyogenes family GH38 α-Mannosidase created using PyMol.

α-Mannosidase (EC 3.2.1.24, α-D-mannosidase, p-nitrophenyl-α-mannosidase, α-D-mannopyranosidase, 1,2-α-mannosidase, 1,2-α-D-mannosidase, exo-α-mannosidase) is an enzyme involved in the cleavage of the α form of mannose. Its systematic name is α-D-mannoside mannohydrolase.

== Isoenzymes ==
Humans express the following three α-mannosidase isoenzymes:

mannosidase, α, class 2B, member 1

Identifiers
- Symbol: MAN2B1
- Alt. symbols: MANB
- NCBI gene: 4125
- HGNC: 6826
- OMIM: 609458
- RefSeq: NM_000528
- UniProt: O00754

Other data
- EC number: 3.2.1.24
- Locus: Chr. 19 cen-q13.1
Search for
- Structures: Swiss-model
- Domains: InterPro

mannosidase, α, class 2B, member 2

Identifiers
- Symbol: MAN2B2
- Alt. symbols: KIAA0935
- NCBI gene: 23324
- HGNC: 29623
- RefSeq: NM_015274
- UniProt: Q9Y2E5

Other data
- EC number: 3.2.1.24
- Locus: Chr. 4 p16.2
Search for
- Structures: Swiss-model
- Domains: InterPro

mannosidase, α, class 2C, member 1

Identifiers
- Symbol: MAN2C1
- Alt. symbols: MANA1, MANA
- NCBI gene: 4123
- HGNC: 6827
- OMIM: 154580
- RefSeq: NM_006715
- UniProt: Q9NTJ4

Other data
- EC number: 3.2.1.24
- Locus: Chr. 15 q11-qter
Search for
- Structures: Swiss-model
- Domains: InterPro

== Applications ==
It can be utilized in experiments that determine the effects of the presence or absence of mannose on specific molecules, such as recombinant proteins that are used in vaccine development.

== Pathology ==
A deficiency can lead to α-mannosidosis.
