= Recombination detection program =

- Developer: Darren Martin
- Stable release: RDP4 Beta 4.97
- Preview release: RDP5 Beta 5.3
- Operating system: Windows
- Size: 42.2 MB
- Website: web.cbio.uct.ac.za/~darren/rdp.html

The Recombination detection program (RDP) is a computer program used to analyse nucleotide sequence data and identify evidence of genetic recombination. Besides applying a large number of different recombination detection methods it also implements various phylogenetic tree construction methods and recombination hotspot tests. The latest version is RDP5.

== See also ==
- Computational phylogenetics
