= Β-Mannosidase =

Protein-coding gene in humans

MANBA

Identifiers
- Aliases: MANBA, MANB1, mannosidase beta
- External IDs: OMIM: 609489; MGI: 88175; GeneCards: MANBA
Enzyme activity
| EC # | BRENDA | ExPASy | KEGG | MetaCyc |
|---|---|---|---|---|
| 3.2.1.25 | ↗ | ↗ | ↗ | ↗ |

Gene location (Human)
| Chr. | Chromosome 4 (human) |
| Band | 4q24 | Start | 102,630,770 bp |
| Band | 4q24 | End | 102,760,994 bp |

Gene location (Mouse)
| Chr. | Chromosome 3 (mouse) |
| Band | 3 G3|3 62.65 cM | Start | 135,191,372 bp |
| Band | 3 G3|3 62.65 cM | End | 135,277,165 bp |
RNA expression pattern
| Bgee | Human / Mouse (ortholog); Top expressed in: monocyte; stromal cell of endometrium; granulocyte; parotid gland; right adrenal cortex; tendon of biceps brachii; blood; Achilles tendon; left adrenal gland; right lung / Top expressed in: utricle; vestibular sensory epithelium; vestibular membrane of cochlear duct; right kidney; stroma of bone marrow; epithelium of small intestine; medullary collecting duct; human kidney; epithelium of stomach; saccule; More reference expression data |
| BioGPS | n/a |
Gene ontology
| Molecular function | hydrolase activity; hydrolase activity, hydrolyzing O-glycosyl compounds; mannose binding; hydrolase activity, acting on glycosyl bonds; beta-mannosidase activity |
| Cellular component | lysosome; lysosomal lumen; plasma membrane; azurophil granule membrane; intracellular membrane-bounded organelle |
| Biological process | metabolism; oligosaccharide catabolic process; neutrophil degranulation; carbohydrate metabolic process; glycoprotein catabolic process; mannan catabolic process |
Sources:Amigo / QuickGO
Orthologs
| Databases | NCBI: entry; OMA: entry |
| Species | Human | Mouse |
| Entrez | 4126 | 110173 |
| Ensembl | ENSG00000109323 | ENSMUSG00000028164 |
| UniProt | O00462 | Q8K2I4 |
| RefSeq (mRNA) | NM_005908 | NM_027288 |
| RefSeq (protein) | NP_005899 | NP_081564 |
| Location (UCSC) | Chr 4: 102.63 – 102.76 Mb | Chr 3: 135.19 – 135.28 Mb |
| PubMed search |
- Wikidata
| View/Edit Human | View/Edit Mouse |

β-Mannosidase

Identifiers
- EC no.: 3.2.1.25
- CAS no.: 9025-43-8

Databases
- BRENDA: enzyme data
- ExPASy: NiceZyme view
- KEGG: enzyme entry
- MetaCyc: metabolic pathway
- Rhea: reactions
- PDB structures: RCSB PDB PDBe PDBsum
- Gene Ontology: AmiGO / QuickGO
Search
- PMC: articles
- PubMed: articles
- NCBI: proteins

β-Mannosidase (EC 3.2.1.25, mannanase, mannase, β-D-mannosidase, β-mannoside mannohydrolase, exo-β-D-mannanase, lysosomal β A mannosidase) is an enzyme with systematic name β-D-mannoside mannohydrolase, which is in humans encoded by the MANBA gene. This enzyme catalyses the following chemical reaction

Hydrolysis of terminal, non-reducing β-D-mannose residues in β-D-mannosides

This gene encodes a member of the glycosyl hydrolase 2 family. The encoded protein localizes to the lysosome where it is the final exoglycosidase in the pathway for N-linked glycoprotein oligosaccharide catabolism. Mutations in this gene are associated with β-mannosidosis, a lysosomal storage disease that has a wide spectrum of neurological involvement.
