= Actinomycetaceae =

Scientific classification
- Domain: Bacteria
- Kingdom: Bacillati
- Phylum: Actinomycetota
- Class: Actinomycetes
- Order: Actinomycetales
- Family: Actinomycetaceae; Buchanan 1918 (Approved Lists 1980)

Type genus
- Actinomyces Harz 1877 (Approved Lists 1980)

Genera
- See text.

Synonyms
- Arcanobacteriaceae Salam et al. 2020

Family of bacteria

The Actinomycetaceae (often called actinomycetes or mycelial bacteria) are a family of bacteria in the order Actinomycetales that contains the medically important genus Actinomyces. These organisms are closely related to the mycobacteria, but were originally classified as fungi because they were thought to be transitional forms between bacteria and fungi.

== Genera ==
The family Actinomycetaceae comprises the following genera:

- Actinobaculum Lawson et al. 1997
- "Actinomonospora" Castellani et al. 1959
- Actinomyces Harz 1877 (Approved Lists 1980)
- Actinotignum Yassin et al. 2015
- "Ancrocorticia" Xu et al. 2019
- Arcanobacterium Collins et al. 1983
- Boudabousia Nouioui et al. 2018
- Bowdeniella corrig. Nouioui et al. 2018
- Buchananella Nouioui et al. 2018
- Changpingibacter Jiao et al. 2026
- Flaviflexus Du et al. 2013
- Fudania Zhu et al. 2019
- Gleimia Nouioui et al. 2018
- Mobiluncus Spiegel and Roberts 1984
- "Neoactinobaculum" Belkacemi et al. 2019
- Pauljensenia Nouioui et al. 2018
- Peptidiphaga Beall et al. 2021
- Schaalia Nouioui et al. 2018
- "Scrofimicrobium" Wylensek et al. 2020
- Tongtianella Luo et al. 2026
- Trueperella Yassin et al. 2011
- Varibaculum Hall et al. 2003
- Winkia Nouioui et al. 2018

== Phylogeny ==
The currently accepted taxonomy is based on the List of Prokaryotic names with Standing in Nomenclature (LPSN). The phylogeny is based on whole-genome analysis. (Note: Flaviflexus, Fudania, and Peptidiphaga are not included in this phylogenetic tree.)

- - Actinomycetales
    - - - Actinobaculum
        - Actinotignum
      - - Trueperella
        - Arcanobacterium
    - - - - Buchananella
          - Bowdeniella
        - Actinomyces
      - - - - Winkia
            - Varibaculum
          - Mobiluncus
        - - - Pauljensenia
            - Boudabousia
          - - Gleimia
            - Schaalia
  - outgroup
    Bifidobacteriales
