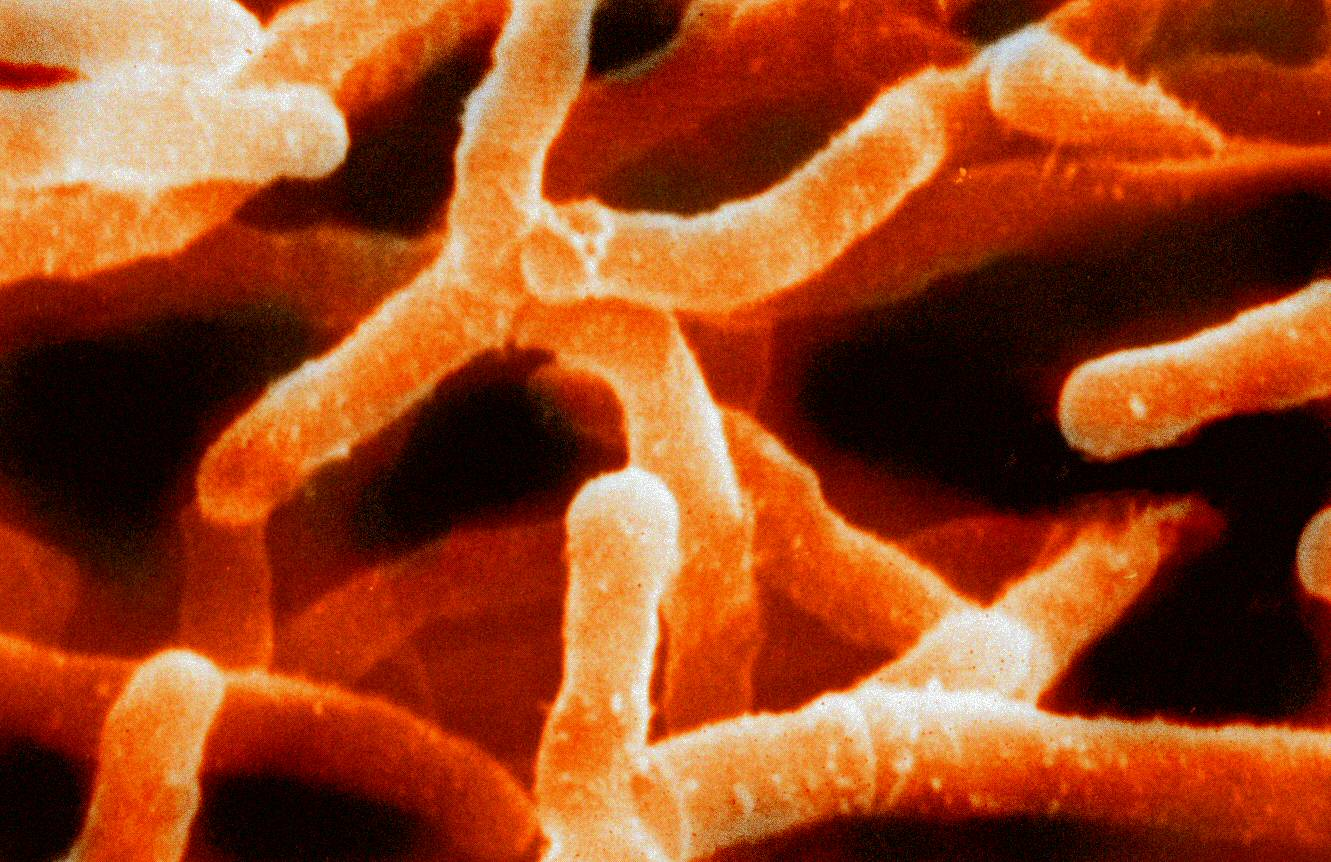
- Scanning electron micrograph of Actinomyces israelii.

Scientific classification
- Domain: Bacteria
- Kingdom: Bacillati
- Phylum: Actinomycetota
- Class: Actinomycetes
- Order: Actinomycetales; Buchanan 1917 (Approved Lists 1980)

Type genus
- Actinomyces Harz 1877 (Approved Lists 1980)

Families
- See text

Synonyms
- "Actinobacteriales" Prévot 1946; Actinomycetineae Stackebrandt, Rainey & Ward-Rainey 1997

= Actinomycetales =

Order of Actinomycota

Actinomycetales is an order of Actinomycetota. A member of the order is often called an actinomycete. Actinomycetales are generally gram-positive and anaerobic and have mycelia in a filamentous and branching growth pattern. Some actinomycetes can form rod- or coccoid-shaped forms, while others can form spores on aerial hyphae. Actinomycetales bacteria can be infected by bacteriophages, which are called actinophages. Actinomycetales can range from harmless bacteria to pathogens with resistance to antibiotics.

== Reproduction ==
Actinomycetales have two main forms of reproduction: spore formation and hyphae fragmentation. During reproduction, Actinomycetales can form conidiophores, sporangiospores, and oidiospores. In reproducing through hyphae fragmentation, the hyphae formed by Actinomycetales can be a fifth to half the size of fungal hyphae, and bear long spore chains.

== Presence and associations ==
Actinomycetales can be found mostly in soil and decaying organic matter, as well as in living organisms such as humans and animals. They form symbiotic nitrogen fixing associations with over 200 species of plants, and can also serve as growth promoting or biocontrol agents, or cause disease in some species of plants. Actinomycetales can be found in the human urogenital tract as well as in the digestive system including the mouth, throat, and gastrointestinal tract in the form of Helicobacter without causing disease in the host. They also have wide medicinal and botanical applications, and are used as a source of many antibiotics and pesticides.

== Antimicrobial properties ==
Many species of Actinomycetes produce antimicrobial compounds under certain conditions and growth media. Streptomycin, actinomycin, and streptothricin are all medically important antibiotics isolated from Actinomycetes bacteria. Almost two-thirds of the natural antimicrobial drug compounds used currently are produced by different species of Actinomycetes.

== Phylogeny ==
The currently accepted taxonomy is based on the List of Prokaryotic names with Standing in Nomenclature (LPSN) and National Center for Biotechnology Information (NCBI).

Whole-genome based phylogeny

- - - Microbacteriales
      - "Tropherymataceae"
      - Microbacteriaceae
  - - - Kineosporiales
        - "Quadrisphaeraceae" [incl. "Kineococcaceae"]
        - - Kineosporiaceae
          - - - Kytococcaceae
              - Ornithinimicrobiaceae
            - - Dermatophilaceae
              - - Dermacoccaceae
                - Intrasporangiaceae
    - - - - Bifidobacteriales
            Bifidobacteriaceae
          - Actinomycetales
            Actinomycetaceae
        - - Cellulomonadales
            - Demequinaceae
            - - - Beutenbergiaceae
                - - Bogoriellaceae
                  - Ruaniaceae
              - - Cellulomonadaceae
                - - Jonesiaceae
                  - Promicromonosporaceae
      - - Micrococcales
          - Dermabacteraceae
          - - Brevibacteriaceae
            - Micrococcaceae

16S rRNA based LTP_10_2024

- - - Bifidobacteriales
      Bifidobacteriaceae
  - - other
    - - other
      - - other
        - - - Kineosporiales
              Kineosporiaceae [incl. Angustibacteraceae; Aquipuribacteraceae; "Kineococcaceae"; Quadrisphaeraceae]
          - - - Microbacteriales
                - - "Caespitibacter"
                  - Tropherymataceae
                - Microbacteriaceae
            - - - Cellulomonadales
                  - - Pseudactinotalea
                    - Demequinaceae
                  - - Sanguibacteraceae
                    - - Oerskoviaceae
                      - - Actinotaleaceae
                        - Cellulomonadaceae
              - - - Actinomycetales
                    - - Bogoriellaceae
                      - - Beutenbergiaceae
                        - Ruaniaceae
                    - - - Rarobacteraceae
                        - Promicromonosporaceae
                      - - Jonesiaceae
                        - Actinomycetaceae [incl. Arcanobacteriaceae]
                - - Dermatophilales
                    - Dermabacteraceae
                    - - - Dermacoccaceae
                        - - Dermatophilaceae [incl. Arsenicicoccaceae]
                          - Ornithinimicrobiaceae
                      - Intrasporangiaceae [incl. Kytococcaceae]
                  - Micrococcales
                    - Brevibacteriaceae
                    - Micrococcaceae [incl. Yaniellaceae]

120 marker proteins based GTDB 09-RS220

- Actinomycetales
  - - "Polyseptineae"
      - - Angustibacteraceae
        - Dermatophilaceae [incl. Arsenicicoccaceae; Dermacoccaceae; Kytococcaceae; Ornithinimicrobiaceae; Intrasporangiaceae]
  - - - Kineosporiineae
        - Quadrisphaeraceae [incl. Aquipuribacteraceae]
        - - Kineosporiaceae
          - "Kineococcaceae"
    - - Actinomycetineae
        - Dermabacteraceae
        - - Demequinaceae
          - - Cellulomonadaceae [incl. Actinotaleaceae; Jonesiaceae; Oerskoviaceae; Promicromonosporaceae; Rarobacteraceae; Sanguibacteraceae]
            - - Beutenbergiaceae [incl. Ruaniaceae]
              - Actinomycetaceae [incl. Arcanobacteriaceae; Bogoriellaceae]
      - Micrococcineae
        - Brevibacteriaceae
        - - Micrococcaceae [incl. Yaniellaceae]
          - - Bifidobacteriaceae
            - Microbacteriaceae [incl. Tropherymataceae]

== See also ==
- Bacterial taxonomy
- List of bacterial orders
- List of bacteria genera
