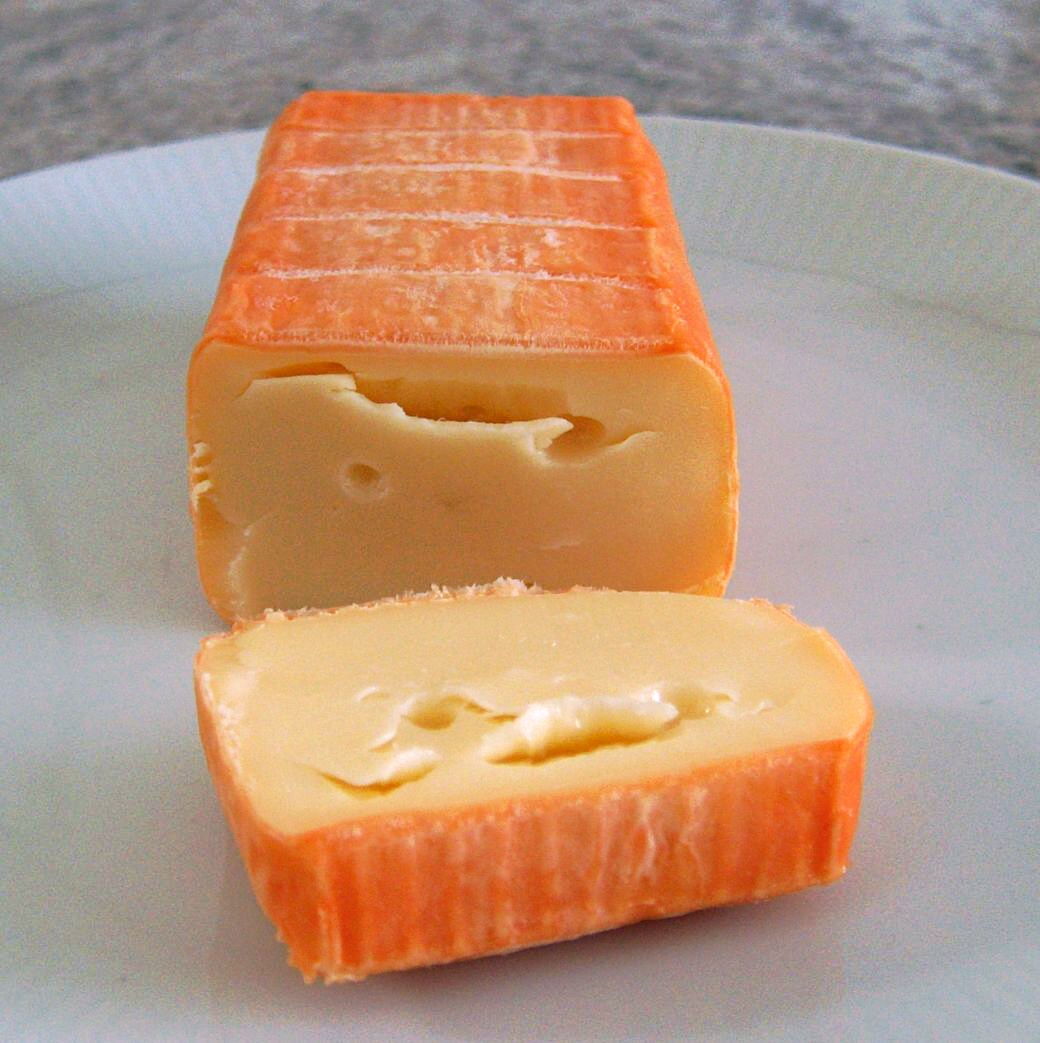
- German Romadur cheese, with Brevibacterium linens causing "red smear" on its surface

Scientific classification
- Domain: Bacteria
- Kingdom: Bacillati
- Phylum: Actinomycetota
- Class: Actinomycetes
- Order: Micrococcales
- Family: Brevibacteriaceae
- Genus: Brevibacterium
- Species: B. linens

Binomial name
- Brevibacterium linens (Wolff 1910) Breed 1953 (Approved Lists 1980)

Type strain
- ATCC 9172; CIP 101125; DSM 20425; HAMBI 2038; IFO 12142; JCM 1327; NBRC 12142; NRRL B-4210; VKM Ac-2112

Synonyms
- "Bacterium linens" Wolff 1910

= Brevibacterium linens =

Species of bacterium

Brevibacterium linens is a gram-positive, rod-shaped bacterium. It is the type species of the family Brevibacteriaceae.

Brevibacterium linens is ubiquitously present on the human skin, where it causes foot odor. The familiar odor is due to sulfur-containing compounds known as S-methyl thioesters. The same bacterium is employed to ferment several washed-rind and smear-ripened cheeses, such as Munster, Limburger, Tilsit cheese, Port-Salut, Raclette, Livarot, Pont l'Eveque, Époisses, Maroilles, Wisconsin Brick, Năsal, and Pálpusztai. It is also used in the production of blue cheese, in addition to the mold Penicillium roqueforti. Its aroma also attracts mosquitoes.

The first comprehensive proteomic reference map of B. linens was published in 2013.

== See also ==
- Blue cheese
