= Brevibacterium iodinum =

Scientific classification
- Domain: Bacteria
- Kingdom: Bacillati
- Phylum: Actinomycetota
- Class: Actinomycetes
- Order: Micrococcales
- Family: Brevibacteriaceae
- Genus: Brevibacterium
- Species: B. iodinum

Binomial name
- Brevibacterium iodinum (ex Davis 1939) Collins et al. 1981

Type strain
- ATCC 49514; BCRC 12216; CCRC 12216; DSM 20626; IFO 15230; IMET 10995; JCM 2591; KCTC 3083; LMG 21453; NBRC 15230; NCDO 613; NCIMB 700613; NCTC 12955; NRRL B-1717; VKM Ac-2106

Synonyms
- "Arthrobacter iodinum" Colwell et al. 1969; "Chromobacterium iodinum" Davis 1939; "Pseudomonas iodina" Tobie 1939; "Pseudomonas iodinum" Tobie 1945

Species of bacterium

Brevibacterium iodinum is a Gram-positive soil bacterium. It can often be found among the normal cutaneous flora of healthy people, particularly in humid environments, and is only very rarely involved in opportunistic infections. It is also suspected to be a cause of foot odor.

The bacterium produces the antibacterial iodinin.
