= Brevibacterium yomogidense =

Scientific classification
- Domain: Bacteria
- Kingdom: Bacillati
- Phylum: Actinomycetota
- Class: Actinomycetia
- Order: Micrococcales
- Family: Brevibacteriaceae
- Genus: Brevibacterium
- Species: B. yomogidense

Binomial name
- Brevibacterium yomogidense Tonouchi et al. 2013

Type strain
- MN-6-a

Species of bacterium

Brevibacterium yomogidense is a Gram-positive and rod-shaped bacterium from the genus of Brevibacterium.
