= Cellulomonas chitinilytica =

Scientific classification
- Domain: Bacteria
- Kingdom: Bacillati
- Phylum: Actinomycetota
- Class: Actinomycetia
- Order: Micrococcales
- Family: Cellulomonadaceae
- Genus: Cellulomonas
- Species: C. chitinilytica

Binomial name
- Cellulomonas chitinilytica Yoon et al. 2008

Type strain
- DSM 17922; JCM 16927; KCTC 19133; X.bu-b

Species of bacterium

Cellulomonas chitinilytica is a chitinolytic, Gram-positive, rod-shaped and non-motile bacterium from the genus Cellulomonas which has been isolated from compost of a cattle farm near Daejeon in Korea.
