= Cellulomonas bogoriensis =

Scientific classification
- Domain: Bacteria
- Kingdom: Bacillati
- Phylum: Actinomycetota
- Class: Actinomycetes
- Order: Micrococcales
- Family: Cellulomonadaceae
- Genus: Cellulomonas
- Species: C. bogoriensis

Binomial name
- Cellulomonas bogoriensis Jones et al. 2005

Type strain
- 69B4; CIP 108683; DSM 16987

Synonyms
- "Actinotalea bogoriensis" (Jones et al. 2005) Semenova et al. 2022

Species of bacterium

Cellulomonas bogoriensis is a Gram-positive, chemoorganotrophic, alkaliphilic, slightly halotolerant and rod-shaped bacterium from the genus Cellulomonas which has been isolated from sediments and water from the littoral zone of the Lake Bogoria in Kenya.
