= Cellulomonas phragmiteti =

Scientific classification
- Domain: Bacteria
- Kingdom: Bacillati
- Phylum: Actinomycetota
- Class: Actinomycetia
- Order: Micrococcales
- Family: Cellulomonadaceae
- Genus: Cellulomonas
- Species: C. phragmiteti

Binomial name
- Cellulomonas phragmiteti Rusznyák et al. 2011

Type strain
- DSM 22512; KB23; NCAIM B002303

Species of bacterium

Cellulomonas phragmiteti is a Gram-positive, moderately halophilic, alkalitolerant, facultatively anaerobic and motile bacterium from the genus Cellulomonas which has been isolated from the plant Phragmites australis from the Kiskunság National Park in Hungary.
