= Serinicoccus marinus =

Scientific classification
- Domain: Bacteria
- Kingdom: Bacillati
- Phylum: Actinomycetota
- Class: Actinomycetes
- Order: Micrococcales
- Family: Ornithinimicrobiaceae
- Genus: Serinicoccus
- Species: S. marinus

Binomial name
- Serinicoccus marinus Yi et al. 2004

Type strain
- CCUG 51944; CIP 108477; DSM 15273; IMSNU 14026; JC1078; JCM 13024; KCTC 9980

Species of bacterium

Serinicoccus marinus is a Gram-positive bacterium species from the genus Serinicoccus which has been isolated from sea water from the Sea of Japan.
