= Fredros Okumu =

Kenyan parasitologist and entomologist

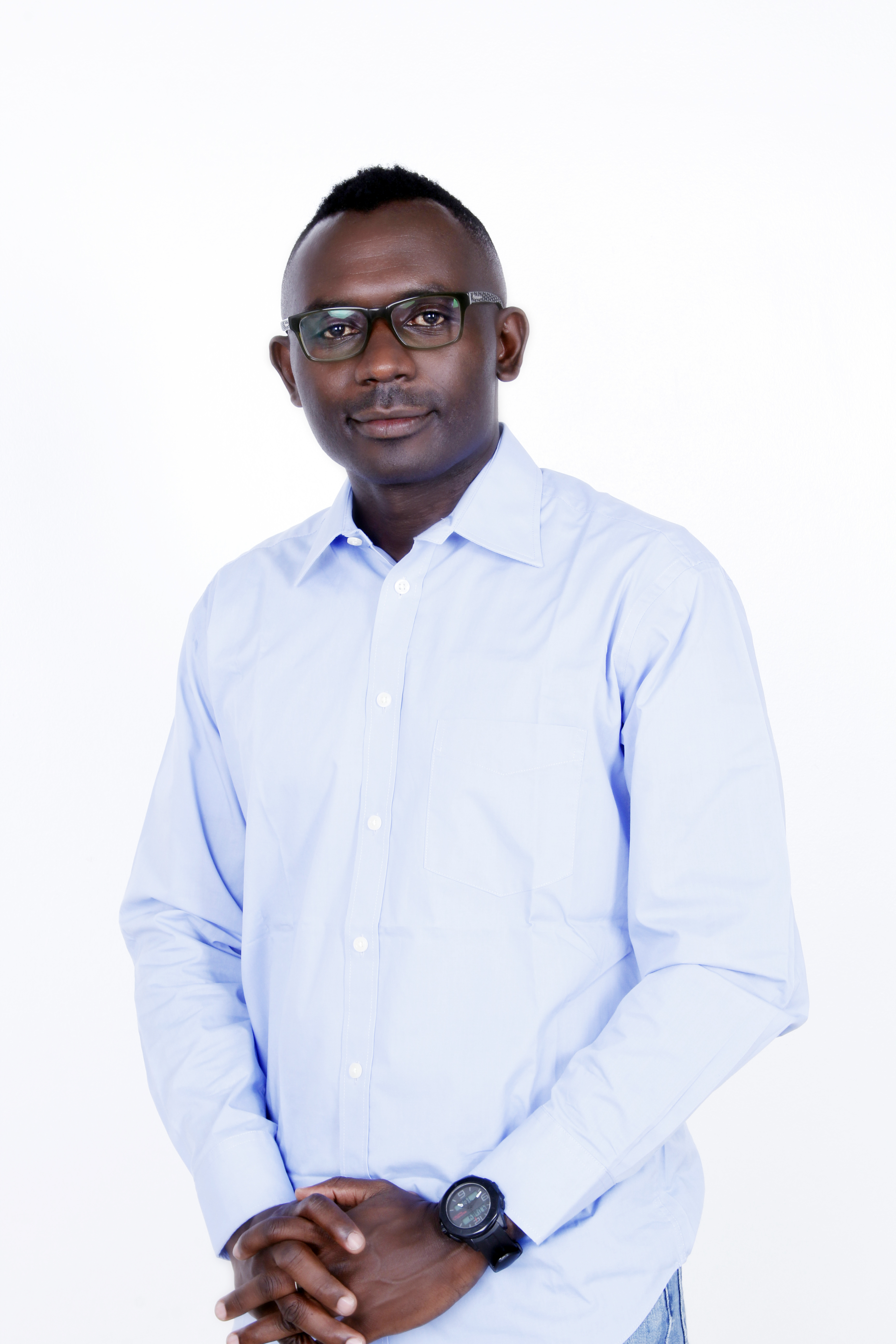
- Born: Kenya
- Education: BSc, MSc, PhD, MBA
- Alma mater: Moi University, Kenya; University of Nairobi, Kenya; London School of Hygiene & Tropical Medicine, United Kingdom
- Awards: American Society of Tropical Medicine and Hygiene Young Investigator Award (2009)
- Scientific career
- Fields: Entomology, Parasitology, Malariology
- Workplaces: Ifakara Health Institute, Tanzania
- Thesis: Combining insecticide treated bed nets and indoor residual spraying for malaria vector control in Africa

Fredros Okumu is a Kenyan parasitologist and entomologist, who currently works as director of science at the Ifakara Health Institute (IHI) in Tanzania. His primary research interests concern the interactions between humans and mosquitoes.

== Education ==
Okumu began his education in his native Kenya, studying Public Health at Moi University and subsequently a masters in Applied Parasitology at the University of Nairobi. He achieved a second masters in geoscience and environmental science at Lund University, Sweden. In 2012 Okumu was awarded a PhD from the London School of Hygiene and Tropical Medicine, followed in 2019 by an MBA in International Health Management from the Swiss Tropical and Public Health Institute.

== Career ==
After leaving school Okumu entered mosquito research by working at the International Centre of Insect Physiology and Ecology. He began at the IHI during his masters research and continued through his PhD and onwards to the present day. Now he is the director of science at the institute. It was during his masters that Okumu developed a synthetic mosquito lure which was 3-5 times more potent than natural human odour.

In addition to his appointment at IHI, Okumu is an associate professor at the University of the Witwatersrand, an adjunct professor at the Nelson Mandela African Institute of Science and Technology, and an Honorary Research Fellow at the University of Glasgow. He has also been a visiting researcher at the Federal University of Minas Gerais.

Okumu is an associate editor at the journal Parasites & Vectors.

== Research ==
Okumu's research interests include the effectiveness of mosquito nets, the evolution of insecticide resistance in mosquitoes and methods of trapping and killing wild mosquitoes. Okumu places a strong emphasis on the use of field studies to determine the effectiveness of mosquito-control strategies. Many devices are tested thoroughly in lab settings; however, these may not recapitulate the effects in the real world. Okumu has been involved in field studies using mosquito baits near his institute and in local villages to test their effectiveness in situ.

The IHI possesses the largest mosquito rearing facility in the world, known as the 'mosquito farm'. This permits Okumu and colleagues to conduct research on mosquito population control measures on large quantities of mosquitoes.

In 2010 Okumu published research of a synthetic lure which attracted mosquitoes 3-5 times more effectively than human odour control. This lure was based on components of human breath, such as carbon dioxide and ammonia. The lure was tested in local villages to establish their best effectiveness in human environments. Okumu was funded by Grand Challenges Canada to produce mosquito trap lures based on foot odor, since research indicates that mosquitoes are most attracted to the feet of humans. This produced a lot of media attention reporting the use of 'stinky socks' to attract and kill mosquitoes.

Foreign Policy honoured Okumu with being a Global Thinker in 2016 for his rapid and innovative design of low-cost Aedes aegypti repellent sandals (as mosquitoes most frequently bite around the ankles) for use in Brazil to help tackle the 2015–16 Zika virus epidemic. Okumu's research into mosquito repellants aims to develop cheap, safe and durable protection from bites using everyday objects, including footwear and even chairs.

Okumu studies the sexual activity of mosquitoes in order to target their mating spots. His research found that mosquitoes cluster to mate in the same locations every year, offering a promising way to identify effective settings for mosquito traps.

== Accolades ==
- 2009 – Scientist of the Year by the Ifakara Health Institute
- 2009 – American Society of Tropical Medicine and Hygiene Young Investigator Award
- 2014 – Al Jazeera Lifelines Health Hero
- 2016 – Foreign Policy Global Thinker
- 2018 – Quartz Africa Africa Innovator
- 2025 - American Society of Tropical Medicine and Hygiene Bailey K. Ashford Medal
