= Brevibacterium limosum =

Scientific classification
- Domain: Bacteria
- Kingdom: Bacillati
- Phylum: Actinomycetota
- Class: Actinomycetia
- Order: Micrococcales
- Family: Brevibacteriaceae
- Genus: Brevibacterium
- Species: B. limosum

Binomial name
- Brevibacterium limosum Pei et al. 2022

Type strain
- o2

Species of bacterium

Brevibacterium limosum is a bacterium from the genus of Brevibacterium which has been isolated from ocean sediments.
