= Cellulomonas carbonis =

Scientific classification
- Domain: Bacteria
- Kingdom: Bacillati
- Phylum: Actinomycetota
- Class: Actinomycetia
- Order: Micrococcales
- Family: Cellulomonadaceae
- Genus: Cellulomonas
- Species: C. carbonis

Binomial name
- Cellulomonas carbonis Shi et al. 2012

Type strain
- CCTCC AB2010450; CGMCC 1.10786; KCTC 19824; T26

Species of bacterium

Cellulomonas carbonis is a Gram-positive, aerobic, rod-shaped and motile bacterium from the genus Cellulomonas which has been isolated from soil from a coal mine in Tianjin, China.
