= Heather M. Ferguson =

Professor of Medical Entomology and Disease Ecology

Heather M. Ferguson FRSE
- Education: University of Toronto (BSc), University of British Columbia (MSc), University of Edinburgh (PhD)
- Occupations: Professor of Medical entomology and disease ecology
- Employer: University of Glasgow
- Organization(s): Ifakara Health Institute, Tanzania - visiting scientist
- Known for: Research in malaria vectors
- Board member of: Co-chair WHO Vector Control Advisory Group

Heather Margaret Ferguson FRSE is a Professor of Medical Entomology and Disease Ecology, at Glasgow University specialising in researching mosquito vectors that spread malaria in global regions where this is endemic. Ferguson co-chairs the WHO Vector Control Advisory Group and was elected as a Fellow of the Royal Society of Edinburgh in 2021.

== Education and career ==
Ferguson graduated BSc (Hons) in Zoology from the University of Toronto in 1995 and MSc from British Columbia University 1998 before completing her doctorate on malaria-parasite vector interactions from 1999 to 2003 in Cell, Animal and Population Biology at the University of Edinburgh. From 2004 to 2006 she did post-doctoral research at the Laboratory of Entomology, Wageningen University, Netherlands and in Tanzania at the Ifakara Health Institute, Morogoro, where as of 2021 she still continues her work as a visiting scientist.

From 2006 to 2012, Ferguson was funded by the BBSRC David Phillips Fellowship at the University of Glasgow, where she was subsequently appointed as a lecturer, senior lecturer in 2013, Reader in 2015 and Professor in 2017.

== Research ==
Ferguson's research output is collated by the University of Glasgow.

From her early work on genetic and environmental factors on virulence of the parasite in mosquitoes (2002) to disease modelling studies (2020), she has collaborated with researchers in international teams on practical and theoretical research. In 2021, Ferguson and colleagues' studies were progressing in Africa and Southeast Asia with focus on the socio-economic impact of malaria on countries where it is prevalent. She has published a WHO technical report on methods of controlling mosquito-spread disease and has been developing a now patented insect trap (patent shared between Glasgow and Ifakara institutes).

Her current work is funded by Wellcome Trust, Bill and Melinda Gates Foundation and the Medical Research Council.

Ferguson has served on the editorial board of the academic journal Parasites and Vectors. She is a former member and co-chair of the World Health Organization's Vector Control Advisory Group (2016-2022), and is a current member of the WHO Strategic Technical Advisory Group on Neglected Tropical Diseases.

== Selected publications ==
- Gerry F Killeen, Tom A Smith, Heather M Ferguson, Hassan Mshinda, Salim Abdulla, Christian Lengeler, Steven P Kachur. 2007. Preventing childhood malaria in Africa by protecting adults from mosquitoes with insecticide-treated nets. PLoS Med 4(7): e229. doi:10.1371/journal.pmed.0040229
- Heather M Ferguson, Anna Dornhaus, Arlyne Beeche, Christian Borgemeister, Michael Gottlieb, Mir S Mulla, John E Gimnig, Durland Fish, Gerry F Killeen. 2010. Ecology: A Prerequisite for Malaria Elimination and Eradication. PLoS Med 7(8): e1000303. doi:10.1371/journal.pmed.1000303
- Heather M Ferguson, Andrew F Read. 2002. Why is the effect of malaria parasites on mosquito survival still unresolved? Trends Para 18(6): 256-261. doi:10.1016/S1471-4922(02)02281-X
- Issa N Lyimo, Heather M Ferguson. Ecological and evolutionary determinants of host species choice in mosquito vectors. Trends Para 25(4): 189-196. doi:10.1016/j.pt.2009.01.005

== Awards ==
Ferguson was a member of the Young Academy of Scotland in 2013, won the Zoological Society of London Scientific Medal in 2016 and was recognised by an award for International Knowledge Exchange by the University of Glasgow. In 2021, she was made a Fellow of the Royal Society of Edinburgh.
