= Cellulomonas soli =

Scientific classification
- Domain: Bacteria
- Kingdom: Bacillati
- Phylum: Actinomycetota
- Class: Actinomycetia
- Order: Micrococcales
- Family: Cellulomonadaceae
- Genus: Cellulomonas
- Species: C. soli

Binomial name
- Cellulomonas soli Hatayama et al. 2013

Type strain
- DSM 24484; JCM 17535; Kc1

Species of bacterium

Cellulomonas soli is a Gram-positive and motile bacterium from the genus Cellulomonas which has been isolated from soil from the botanical garden from Kawasaki in Japan.
