= Cellulomonas iranensis =

Scientific classification
- Domain: Bacteria
- Kingdom: Bacillati
- Phylum: Actinomycetota
- Class: Actinomycetia
- Order: Micrococcales
- Family: Cellulomonadaceae
- Genus: Cellulomonas
- Species: C. iranensis

Binomial name
- Cellulomonas iranensis Elberson et al. 2000

Type strain
- ATCC 700643; CIP 107678; DSM 14785; IFO 16734; JCM 12410; JCM 18110; KCTC 9983; NBRC 101100; NBRC 16734

Species of bacterium

Cellulomonas iranensis is a cellulolytic and mesophilic bacterium from the genus Cellulomonas which has been isolated from forest soil from Iran.
