= Cellulomonas marina =

Scientific classification
- Domain: Bacteria
- Kingdom: Bacillati
- Phylum: Actinomycetota
- Class: Actinomycetes
- Order: Micrococcales
- Family: Cellulomonadaceae
- Genus: Cellulomonas
- Species: C. marina

Binomial name
- Cellulomonas marina Zhang et al. 2013

Type strain
- CGMCC 4.6945; DSM 24960; FXJ8.089

Species of bacterium

Cellulomonas marina is a bacterium from the genus Cellulomonas which has been isolated from deep-sea water from the Indian Ocean.
