= Cellulomonas pakistanensis =

Scientific classification
- Domain: Bacteria
- Kingdom: Bacillati
- Phylum: Actinomycetota
- Class: Actinomycetia
- Order: Micrococcales
- Family: Cellulomonadaceae
- Genus: Cellulomonas
- Species: C. pakistanensis

Binomial name
- Cellulomonas pakistanensis Ahmed et al. 2014

Type strain
- DSM 24792; JCM 18755; KCTC 19798; NCCP-11

Species of bacterium

Cellulomonas pakistanensis is a plant-growth-promoting, facultatively anaerobic, moderately halotolerant rod-shaped and motile bacterium from the genus Cellulomonas which has been isolated from paddy grains from the National Agricultural Research Centre in Pakistan.
