= Cellulomonas persica =

Scientific classification
- Domain: Bacteria
- Kingdom: Bacillati
- Phylum: Actinomycetota
- Class: Actinomycetia
- Order: Micrococcales
- Family: Cellulomonadaceae
- Genus: Cellulomonas
- Species: C. persica

Binomial name
- Cellulomonas persica Elberson et al. 2000

Type strain
- ATCC 700642; CIP 107677; DSM 14784; IFO 16733; JCM 12411; JCM 18111; KCTC 9984; NBRC 101101; NBRC 16733

Species of bacterium

Cellulomonas persica is a mesophilic and cellulolytic bacterium from the genus Cellulomonas which has been isolated from forest soil in Iran.
