= Cellulomonas denverensis =

Scientific classification
- Domain: Bacteria
- Kingdom: Bacillati
- Phylum: Actinomycetota
- Class: Actinomycetia
- Order: Micrococcales
- Family: Cellulomonadaceae
- Genus: Cellulomonas
- Species: C. denverensis

Binomial name
- Cellulomonas denverensis Brown et al. 2005

Type strain
- ATCC BAA-788; CCUG 18431; CDC C2508; CDC W6929; CIP 108914; DSM 15764; JCM 14733; SBS C2508; W2777; W6929

Species of bacterium

Cellulomonas denverensis is a bacterium from the genus Cellulomonas which has been isolated from human blood in the United States.
