= Serinicoccus profundi =

Scientific classification
- Domain: Bacteria
- Kingdom: Bacillati
- Phylum: Actinomycetota
- Class: Actinomycetes
- Order: Micrococcales
- Family: Ornithinimicrobiaceae
- Genus: Serinicoccus
- Species: S. profundi

Binomial name
- Serinicoccus profundi Xiao et al. 2011

Type strain
- 0714S6-1; CGMCC 4.5582; DSM 21363; JCM 17740; MCCC 1A05965

Species of bacterium

Serinicoccus profundi is a Gram-positive bacterium species from the genus Serinicoccus which has been isolated from deep-sea sediments from the Indian Ocean.
