= Serinicoccus chungangensis =

Scientific classification
- Domain: Bacteria
- Kingdom: Bacillati
- Phylum: Actinomycetota
- Class: Actinomycetes
- Order: Micrococcales
- Family: Ornithinimicrobiaceae
- Genus: Serinicoccus
- Species: S. chungangensis

Binomial name
- Serinicoccus chungangensis Traiwan et al. 2011

Type strain
- CCUG 59777; KCTC 19774; CAU 9536

Species of bacterium

Serinicoccus chungangensis is a Gram-positive and halophilic bacterium species from the genus Serinicoccus which has been isolated from tidal flat sediments from the Seogmo Island in Korea.
