= Cellulomonas composti =

Scientific classification
- Domain: Bacteria
- Kingdom: Bacillati
- Phylum: Actinomycetota
- Class: Actinomycetia
- Order: Micrococcales
- Family: Cellulomonadaceae
- Genus: Cellulomonas
- Species: C. composti

Binomial name
- Cellulomonas composti Kang et al. 2007

Type strain
- TR7-6; JCM 14898; KCTC 19030; NBRC 100758

Species of bacterium

Cellulomonas composti is a Gram-positive, cellulolytic, rod-shaped and non-motile bacterium from the genus Cellulomonas which has been isolated from compost from a cattle farm near Daejeon in Korea.
