= Cellulomonas xylanilytica =

Scientific classification
- Domain: Bacteria
- Kingdom: Bacillati
- Phylum: Actinomycetota
- Class: Actinomycetia
- Order: Micrococcales
- Family: Cellulomonadaceae
- Genus: Cellulomonas
- Species: C. xylanilytica

Binomial name
- Cellulomonas xylanilytica Rivas et al. 2004

Type strain
- CECT 5729; CIL11; CIP 108340; DSM 16933; JCM 14281; LMG 21723; NBRC 101102; XIL11

Species of bacterium

Cellulomonas xylanilytica is a Gram-positive, aerobic, cellulolytic, xylanolytic and non-motile bacterium from the genus Cellulomonas.
