= Cellulomonas aerilata =

Scientific classification
- Domain: Bacteria
- Kingdom: Bacillati
- Phylum: Actinomycetota
- Class: Actinomycetia
- Order: Micrococcales
- Family: Cellulomonadaceae
- Genus: Cellulomonas
- Species: C. aerilata

Binomial name
- Cellulomonas aerilata Lee et al. 2008

Type strain
- 5420S-23; CIP 110191; DSM 18649; JCM 16376; KACC 20692

Species of bacterium

Cellulomonas aerilata is a Gram-positive, aerobic and motile bacterium from the genus Cellulomonas which has been isolated from air from Suwon in Korea.
