= Cellulomonas terrae =

Scientific classification
- Domain: Bacteria
- Kingdom: Bacillati
- Phylum: Actinomycetota
- Class: Actinomycetia
- Order: Micrococcales
- Family: Cellulomonadaceae
- Genus: Cellulomonas
- Species: C. terrae

Binomial name
- Cellulomonas terrae An et al. 2005

Type strain
- JCM 14899; KCTC 19081; NBRC 100819; DB5

Species of bacterium

Cellulomonas terrae is a Gram-positive, polysaccharide-degrading, cellulolytic, xylanolytic and non-motile bacterium from the genus Cellulomonas which has been isolated from soil from Daejeon in Korea.
