= Cellulomonas massiliensis =

Scientific classification
- Domain: Bacteria
- Kingdom: Bacillati
- Phylum: Actinomycetota
- Class: Actinomycetia
- Order: Micrococcales
- Family: Cellulomonadaceae
- Genus: Cellulomonas
- Species: C. massiliensis

Binomial name
- Cellulomonas massiliensis Lagier et al. 2015

Type strain
- CSUR P160; DSM 25695; JC225

Species of bacterium

Cellulomonas massiliensis is a rod-shaped bacterium from the genus Cellulomonas which has been isolated from human feces from Dielmo in Senegal.
