= Cellulomonas oligotrophica =

Scientific classification
- Domain: Bacteria
- Kingdom: Bacillati
- Phylum: Actinomycetota
- Class: Actinomycetia
- Order: Micrococcales
- Family: Cellulomonadaceae
- Genus: Cellulomonas
- Species: C. oligotrophica

Binomial name
- Cellulomonas oligotrophica Hatayama et al. 2013

Type strain
- DSM 24482; JCM 17534; Kc5

Species of bacterium

Cellulomonas oligotrophica is a Gram-positive and motile bacterium from the genus Cellulomonas which has been isolated from soil from Kanagawa in Japan.
