= Brevibacterium hankyongi =

Scientific classification
- Domain: Bacteria
- Kingdom: Bacillati
- Phylum: Actinomycetota
- Class: Actinomycetia
- Order: Micrococcales
- Family: Brevibacteriaceae
- Genus: Brevibacterium
- Species: B. hankyongi

Binomial name
- Brevibacterium hankyongi Choi et al. 2018

Type strain
- BS05

Species of bacterium

Brevibacterium hankyongi is a Gram-positive, rod-shaped, strictly aerobic and non-motil bacterium from the genus of Brevibacterium which has been isolated from compost.
