= "Tropheryma" =

Scientific classification
- Domain: Bacteria
- Kingdom: Bacillati
- Phylum: Actinomycetota
- Class: Actinomycetes
- Order: Micrococcales
- Family: "Tropherymataceae"; Nouioui et al. 2018
- Genus: "Tropheryma" La Scola et al. 2001
- Species: "T. whipplei"

Binomial name
- "Tropheryma whipplei" La Scola et al. 2001

Synonyms
- Tropheryma whippelii Relman et al. 1992

Genus of bacteria

"Tropheryma whipplei" is a rod-shaped, environmental actinomycete that is the causative organism of Whipple's disease, and rarely, endocarditis.

As of 2008, the species, genus, and family name are considered to be invalid due to irregularities in the deposition of type material and are thus styled in quotation marks.

== Microbiology ==
While "T. whipplei" is categorized with the Gram-positive Actinomycetota, the organism is commonly found to be Gram-positive or Gram-indeterminate when stained in the laboratory. Whipple himself probably observed the organisms as rod-shaped structures with silver stain in his original case.

"T. whipplei" is most closely related to Dermatophilus congolensis, Arthrobacter globiformis, Cellulomonas hominis and Rothia dentocariosa, and is distantly related to Streptomyces spp. and Mycobacterium spp. The bacterium is currently classified in an intermediate position between cellulomonads and actinomycetes containing the group B peptidoglycan.

Microscopic examination of periodic acid Schiff stained duodenal or jejunal biopsy specimens in Whipple's disease patients reveals infiltration of the lamina propria by large macrophages containing granular, foamy periodic acid Schiff positive inclusions that are resistant to diastase. Additionally, staining with silver stain and Gram stain can also produce positive results. However, involvement of the gastrointestinal tract or lymphatic tissue can be accompanied by noncaseating, epithelioid cells which would stain PAS negative. Infection with fungi, nontuberculous mycobacteria (especially in AIDS patients) and several other organisms can mimic Whipple's disease histologically, but some of these organisms may be ruled out using Ziehl-Neelsen staining.

Culture of "T. whipplei" is possible but is very difficult and is of little diagnostic use due to its slow doubling time of 18 days. On average, it takes 30 days to detect "T. whipplei" in culture. The bacterium was first successfully cultured in human fibroblast cell lines in 2000. A synthetic medium was developed in 2003 that contained amino acids and other components that "T. whipplei" is unable to synthesize and has been successfully used to culture and establish several strains of "T. whipplei".

== History of the name ==
No name was given to the organism until 1991, when the name "Tropheryma whippelii" was proposed after sections of the bacterial genome were sequenced. The name was changed to "Tropheryma whipplei" in 2001 (correcting the spelling of Whipple's name) when the organism was deposited in bacterial collections.

The genus name Tropheryma arises from the Greek words for trophe ("nourishment") and eryma ("barrier"), referring to the bacterium's ability to cause malabsorption.

== Genome structure ==
Several strains of "T. whipplei" have been sequenced.

"T. whipplei" is deficient in the genes for energy metabolism and amino acid synthesis, hence its host-dependent life cycle. A large chromosomal inversion and the presence of a common, highly conserved repeat is revealed in the genome of "T. whipplei", resulting in the expression of different subsets of cell surface proteins, representing a potential mechanism for evasion of the host immune responses.

Genomes of intracellular or parasitic bacteria undergo massive reduction compared to their free-living relatives. With a genome size of less than 1 Mb, "T. whipplei" is currently the only known reduced-genome species in the Actinomycetota. Other examples of reduced genome bacteria include Mycoplasma for Bacillota (the low G+C content Gram-positive), Rickettsia for Alphaproteobacteria, and Wigglesworthia and Buchnera for Gammaproteobacteria.
