= Ornithinimicrobium humiphilum =

Scientific classification
- Domain: Bacteria
- Kingdom: Bacillati
- Phylum: Actinomycetota
- Class: Actinomycetes
- Order: Micrococcales
- Family: Intrasporangiaceae
- Genus: Ornithinimicrobium
- Species: O. humiphilum

Binomial name
- Ornithinimicrobium humiphilum Groth et al. 2001

Type strain
- 2115-015; CIP 106634; DSM 12362; HKI 0124; JCM 11540; KCTC 19900; KCTC 19901; NBRC 106159; NCIMB 13784

Species of bacterium

Ornithinimicrobium humiphilum is a Gram-positive, non-spore-forming and non-motile bacterium species from the genus Ornithinimicrobium which has been isolated from garden soil from Germany.
