= Georgenia ruanii =

Scientific classification
- Domain: Bacteria
- Kingdom: Bacillati
- Phylum: Actinomycetota
- Class: Actinomycetes
- Order: Micrococcales
- Family: Bogoriellaceae
- Genus: Georgenia
- Species: G. ruanii

Binomial name
- Georgenia ruanii Li et al. 2007

Species of bacterium

Georgenia ruanii is a bacterium. It is Gram-positive, motile and short-rod-shaped.
