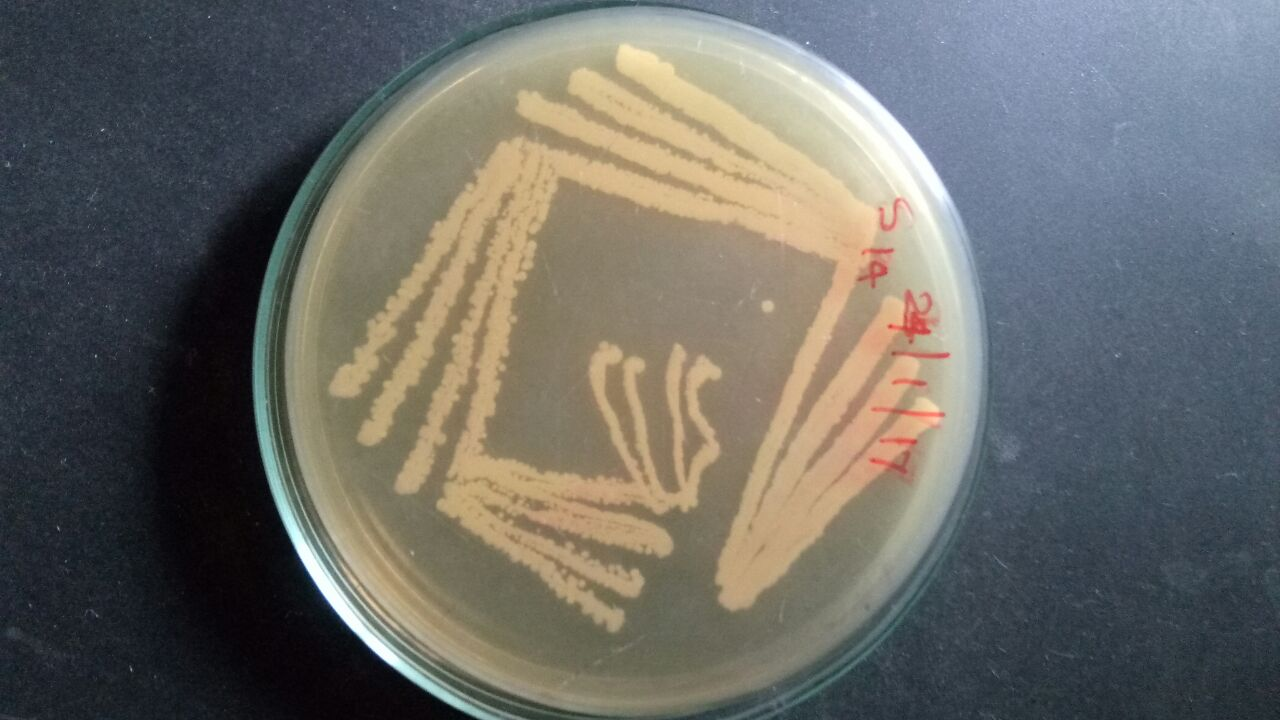
- Kytococcus sedentarius culture on Zobell's Marine Agar (Himedia) plate (quadrant streak plate).

Scientific classification
- Domain: Bacteria
- Kingdom: Bacillati
- Phylum: Actinomycetota
- Class: Actinomycetes
- Order: Micrococcales
- Family: Kytococcaceae
- Genus: Kytococcus
- Species: K. sedentarius

Binomial name
- Kytococcus sedentarius (ZoBell and Upham 1944) Stackebrandt, Koch, Gvozdiak & Schumann, 1995

Type strain
- ATCC 14392; CCM 314; CCUG 33030; CIP 81.72; DSM 20547; IFO 15357; JCM 11482; LMG 14228; NBRC 15357; NCTC 11040; VKM B-1316

Synonyms
- Micrococcus sedentarius ZoBell and Upham 1944 (Approved Lists 1980)

= Kytococcus sedentarius =

Species of bacterium

Kytococcus sedentarius is a marine dwelling Gram positive bacterium in the genus Kytococcus. It is known for the production of polyketide antibiotics as well as for its role as an opportunistic pathogen. It is strictly aerobic and can only grow when amino acids are provided.

It is found in tetrads, irregular clusters, and cubical packets of eight. It is catalase positive, oxidase positive, and exhibits strictly aerobic metabolism. Optimum growth temperature is 25–37 °C (77–99 °F). It is primarily isolated from human skin, and is one of the major causes of pitted keratolysis. It was once considered a species of the genus Micrococcus.

== Genome ==
The genome has been sequenced and contains 2,785,024 bp, which is among the smallest for Actinomycetes, with a G+C content of 71.6%. This encodes 2639 protein coding genes.

== Pitted keratolysis ==
Kytococcus sedentarius may pose a risk to human health through the development of pitted keratolysis, a skin condition characterized by the formation of small pits on the feet and occasionally on the palms, accompanied by potential foul odor and discomfort. This condition typically arises when the feet are exposed to prolonged periods of warmth and humidity, creating an environment suitable to the growth of K. sedentarius and other bacteria. While the process is not fully known, research suggests that K. sedentarius produces proteases, namely P1 and P2, which degrade various substrates found in human skin, including azocasein, insulin β-chain, and keratin. This enzymatic breakdown of keratin, a major component of the skin's horny layers, results in the signature pitted appearance observed in affected areas. Studies indicate that these proteases work best within a slightly acidic pH range of 6.3–6.9, which is why it is important to maintain proper foot hygiene to prevent pitted keratolysis. Additionally, these enzymatic reactions can generate sulfur compounds such as thiols, sulfides, and thioesters, contributing to the foul odor associated with the condition. Treatments for pitted keratolysis typically involve antibiotics aimed at eliminating K. sedentarius and associated bacteria. Commonly prescribed antibiotics include erythromycin, mupirocin, and clindamycin. Preventive measures include keeping the feet dry and using absorbent cotton socks to minimize moisture accumulation.

== Infections ==
While Kytococcus sedentarius is typically regarded as a harmless bacteria, rare instances of infection attributable to this K. sedentarius have been documented, particularly in individuals with compromised immune systems. One case involves a 79-year-old woman with type 2 diabetes and hypertension, who was diagnosed with infectious spondylitis. Upon surgical removal and analyzation of the infected tissue, K. sedentarius was identified as the causative agent. Although how K. sedentarius could have caused the infection is uncertain, it is likely that the breakage of skin barriers during invasive procedures, such as injection therapy, may have caused the bacteria to enter. Another noteworthy case involves a 66-year-old woman with end-stage renal disease due to type 2 diabetes, who developed peritoneal dialysis-associated peritonitis attributed to Kytococcus sedentarius. This case highlights the potential for touch contamination in infections by Kytococcus sedentarius. Another case involves a 55-year-old man with leukemia who developed hemorrhagic pneumonia likely caused by K. sedentarius after getting induction chemotherapy. It was likely that the chemo caused injuries in the mucosal barrier, which allowed the bacteria to penetrate the gut and reach the lungs through the bloodstreams.

== Shoes ==
K. sedentarius is associated with the common foul odour of shoes and other footwear. It can be killed by C-Band ultraviolet light such as that from a germicidal lamp.
