= Cellulomonas hominis =

Scientific classification
- Domain: Bacteria
- Kingdom: Bacillati
- Phylum: Actinomycetota
- Class: Actinomycetia
- Order: Micrococcales
- Family: Cellulomonadaceae
- Genus: Cellulomonas
- Species: C. hominis

Binomial name
- Cellulomonas hominis Funke et al. 1996

Type strain
- ATCC 51964; CCM 4572; CCUG 34783; CIP 104574; DMMZ 740; DMMZ CE40; DSM 9581; IFM 10516; IFO 16055; JCM 12133; KCTC 9982; LMG 17240; NBRC 16055

Species of bacterium

Cellulomonas hominis is a bacterium from the genus Cellulomonas which has been isolated from cerebrospinal fluid in Switzerland.
