= Foot odor =

Type of body odor that affects the feet of humans

Foot odor (also spelled foot odour) or bromodosis is a type of body odor that affects the feet of humans.

== Causes ==
The main cause is foot sweat (also see focal hyperhidrosis). Sweat itself is odorless, but it creates a beneficial environment for certain bacteria to grow, producing odorous substances. These bacteria are naturally present on human skin as part of the human microbiome. The front part of the foot produces the most sweat.

The smell is exacerbated by factors that increase sweating, such as wearing closed-toe shoes. Sports footwear such as sneakers is often heavily padded inside which provides a perfect environment to trap moisture and allow the bacteria to thrive. Socks can trap foot hair, especially on the toes, and may contribute to odor intensity by increasing surface area on which bacteria can thrive.

Given that socks directly contact the feet, their composition can affect foot odor. Synthetic materials like polyester and nylon afford less ventilation to the foot than do cotton or wool, leading to increased perspiration and odor, although they can also reduce incidence of blisters by wicking away perspiration. Many synthetic socks are treated with chemicals to help reduce odor.

Wearing closed-toe shoes (e.g., ballet flats or pumps) without socks leads to accumulation of sweat, dead skin cells, dirt, and oils, further contributing to bacterial growth.

A different cause of foul odor from the feet is onychomycosis, a fungal infection of the toenails.

== Odor qualities ==
Brevibacteria are considered a major cause of foot odor because they ingest dead skin on the feet and, in the process, convert the amino acid methionine into methanethiol, a colorless gas with a distinctive sulfuric aroma. The dead skin that fuels this process is especially common on the sole and between the toes. Brevibacteria also give such cheeses as Limburger, Bel Paese, Port Salut, Pálpusztai and Munster their characteristic pungency.

Isovaleric acid (3-methyl butanoic acid), another source of foot odor, is produced by Staphylococcus epidermidis, a bacterial species normally resident on human skin and present in several strong-smelling varieties of cheese.

Other implicated microorganisms include Micrococcaceae, Corynebacterium and Pityrosporum.

Bart Knols of Wageningen Agricultural University in the Netherlands received a 2006 "Ig Nobel Prize" for demonstrating that the female Anopheles gambiae mosquito, known for transmitting malaria, is "attracted equally to the smell of Limburger cheese and to the smell of human feet". Fredros Okumu, of the Ifakara Health Institute in Tanzania, received grants in 2009 and 2011 to develop mosquito attractants and traps to combat malaria. He used a blend of eight chemicals four times more effective than actual human secretions.

== Prevention ==
Maintaining good foot hygiene is the best way to prevent foot odor as it eliminates odor causing bacteria and removes dead skin cells as well as sebum. A foot file, pumice stone or chemical treatment, such as an Alpha hydroxy acid containing foot peel preparation, can be used to remove dead skin cells. Using antibacterial soap to wash feet daily; keeping feet dry by changing socks daily and wearing cotton or wool instead of synthetic fibers can also help reduce moisture build-up. Using medicated insoles and foot powder can also help.

== Management ==
In some cases, medical intervention may be needed to treat the bacterial or fungal infection with a topical antibacterial or fungicide.

== As a paraphilia ==
Foot odor is one of the most widespread forms of olfactophilia; in a 1994 study, 45% of those with a foot fetish were found to be aroused by smelly socks and/or feet, but most importantly by the intensity of the smell produced by such bacteria.

== See also ==
- Body odor
- Body odour and sexual attraction
- Shoe
- Smelly socks
