= Demequina mangrovi =

Scientific classification
- Domain: Bacteria
- Kingdom: Bacillati
- Phylum: Actinomycetota
- Class: Actinomycetes
- Order: Micrococcales
- Family: Demequinaceae
- Genus: Demequina
- Species: D. mangrovi

Binomial name
- Demequina mangrovi (Hamada et al. 2012) Nouioui et al. 2018

Type strain
- DSM 24868; NBRC 105856; HI08-69

Synonyms
- Lysinimicrobium mangrovi Hamada et al. 2012

Species of bacterium

Demequina mangrovi is a Gram-positive bacterium from the genus Demequina which has been isolated from rhizospheric soil of the mangrove plant Bruguiera gymnorhiza.
