= Jonesia =

Scientific classification
- Domain: Bacteria
- Kingdom: Bacillati
- Phylum: Actinomycetota
- Class: Actinomycetes
- Order: Micrococcales
- Family: Jonesiaceae
- Genus: Jonesia; Rocourt and Stackebrandt 1987

Type species
- Jonesia denitrificans (Prévot 1961) Rocourt et al. 1987

Species
- J. denitrificans (Prévot 1961) Rocourt et al. 1987; "J. luteola" Li et al. 2015; J. quinghaiensis Schumann et al. 2004

Genus of bacteria

Jonesia is a genus of Actinomycetota.
