= Ornithinimicrobium kibberense =

Scientific classification
- Domain: Bacteria
- Kingdom: Bacillati
- Phylum: Actinomycetota
- Class: Actinomycetes
- Order: Micrococcales
- Family: Intrasporangiaceae
- Genus: Ornithinimicrobium
- Species: O. kibberense

Binomial name
- Ornithinimicrobium kibberense Mayilraj et al. 2006

Type strain
- CIP 109338; DSM 17687; JCM 12763; K22-20; MTCC 6545

Species of bacterium

Ornithinimicrobium kibberense is a bacterium species from the genus Ornithinimicrobium which has been isolated from soil from the Indian Himalayas.
