= Demequina sediminis =

Scientific classification
- Domain: Bacteria
- Kingdom: Bacillati
- Phylum: Actinomycetota
- Class: Actinomycetes
- Order: Micrococcales
- Family: Demequinaceae
- Genus: Demequina
- Species: D. sediminis

Binomial name
- Demequina sediminis (Hamada et al. 2017) Yang and Zhi 2020

Type strain
- NBRC 112286; TBRC 7037; HT7-17

Synonyms
- Lysinimicrobium sediminis Hamada et al. 2017

Species of bacterium

Demequina sediminis is a Gram-positive bacterium from the genus Demequina which has been isolated from sediments from the Tama River in Japan.
