= Ornithinimicrobium algicola =

Scientific classification
- Domain: Bacteria
- Kingdom: Bacillati
- Phylum: Actinomycetota
- Class: Actinomycetes
- Order: Micrococcales
- Family: Intrasporangiaceae
- Genus: Ornithinimicrobium
- Species: O. algicola

Binomial name
- Ornithinimicrobium algicola Ramaprasad et al. 2015

Type strain
- KCTC 39559; LMG 28808; JC311

Species of bacterium

Ornithinimicrobium algicola is a Gram-positive and non-spore-forming bacterium species from the genus Ornithinimicrobium which has been isolated from the green Ulva.
