= Ornithinimicrobium tianjinense =

Scientific classification
- Domain: Bacteria
- Kingdom: Bacillati
- Phylum: Actinomycetota
- Class: Actinomycetes
- Order: Micrococcales
- Family: Intrasporangiaceae
- Genus: Ornithinimicrobium
- Species: O. tianjinense

Binomial name
- Ornithinimicrobium tianjinense Liu et al. 2013

Type strain
- B2; CGMCC 1.12160; JCM 18464

Species of bacterium

Ornithinimicrobium tianjinense is a Gram-positive, non-spore-forming, heterotrophic and strictly aerobic bacterium species from the genus Ornithinimicrobium which has been isolated from a recirculating aquaculture system.
