= Demequina flava =

Scientific classification
- Domain: Bacteria
- Kingdom: Bacillati
- Phylum: Actinomycetota
- Class: Actinomycetes
- Order: Micrococcales
- Family: Demequinaceae
- Genus: Demequina
- Species: D. flava

Binomial name
- Demequina flava Hamada et al. 2013

Type strain
- DSM 24865; HR08-7; NBRC 105854

Species of bacterium

Demequina flava is a Gram-positive bacterium from the genus Demequina which has been isolated from marine sediments from the Rishiri Island in Japan.
