= Health for All Project Albania =

Healthcare NGO in Albania

The Health for All Project (HAP) is a Swiss Agency for Development and Cooperation (SDC) project implemented by the Swiss Tropical and Public Health Institute in Albania aiming to improve primary healthcare services for the Albanian population. The project is divided into two phases:

Phase 1 started in 2015 and was completed in March 2019 and was implemented by a consortium of NGO's; the Swiss Tropical and Public Health Institute (leading part), Terre des hommes, and Save the Children. The budget for the first phase amounted to a total of CHF 10 million. Phase 2 of the project started in April 2019. It is implemented solely by the Swiss Tropical and Public Health Institute through the HAP center with a budget of CHF 6 million. Scheduled ending of the project is March 2023.

The overall goal of the project is embedded into the Swiss Cooperation Strategy for Albania (2018-2021) and is stated as follows: The Albanian population benefits from better health thanks to improved primary healthcare services.

== Background ==
Preceding the project, Albania had the lowest budget for health care per capita in the region, with approximately US$228 (compared to e.g. Serbia, US$561 per capita). A dysfunctional referral system, with many patients bypassing primary healthcare (PHC) and overburdening secondary and tertiary service levels (e.g. hospitals) are among issues. Additionally, the already low number of medical professionals in relation to the population is unequally distributed between rural and urban regions and both outdated education and qualification standards especially at the primary healthcare level as well es migration of doctors and nurses to Western Europe contribute to an inefficient healthcare system. Finally, the raise of non-communicable diseases (NCDs) through socio-demographic change and insufficient considerations given to them are among the biggest cause of mortality, with cardiovascular diseases accounting for 52% of all deaths.

The Swiss Agency for Development and Cooperation has been engaged in Albania since 1993 through various different programs, especially in the health sector. An extensive assessment of the healthcare sector conducted in 2012 provided the basis for the project. To reach its goal, the project implements a 'system strengthening' approach from both the supply and demand side. Focusing on the services of primary health care, expected overall outcomes are (1) improved quality of healthcare services and (2) enhanced access to services by the population. The project is active in both phases mainly in two regions (qarks) of Albania, namely in Dibër and Fier, with the aim to up-scale successful interventions throughout the country.

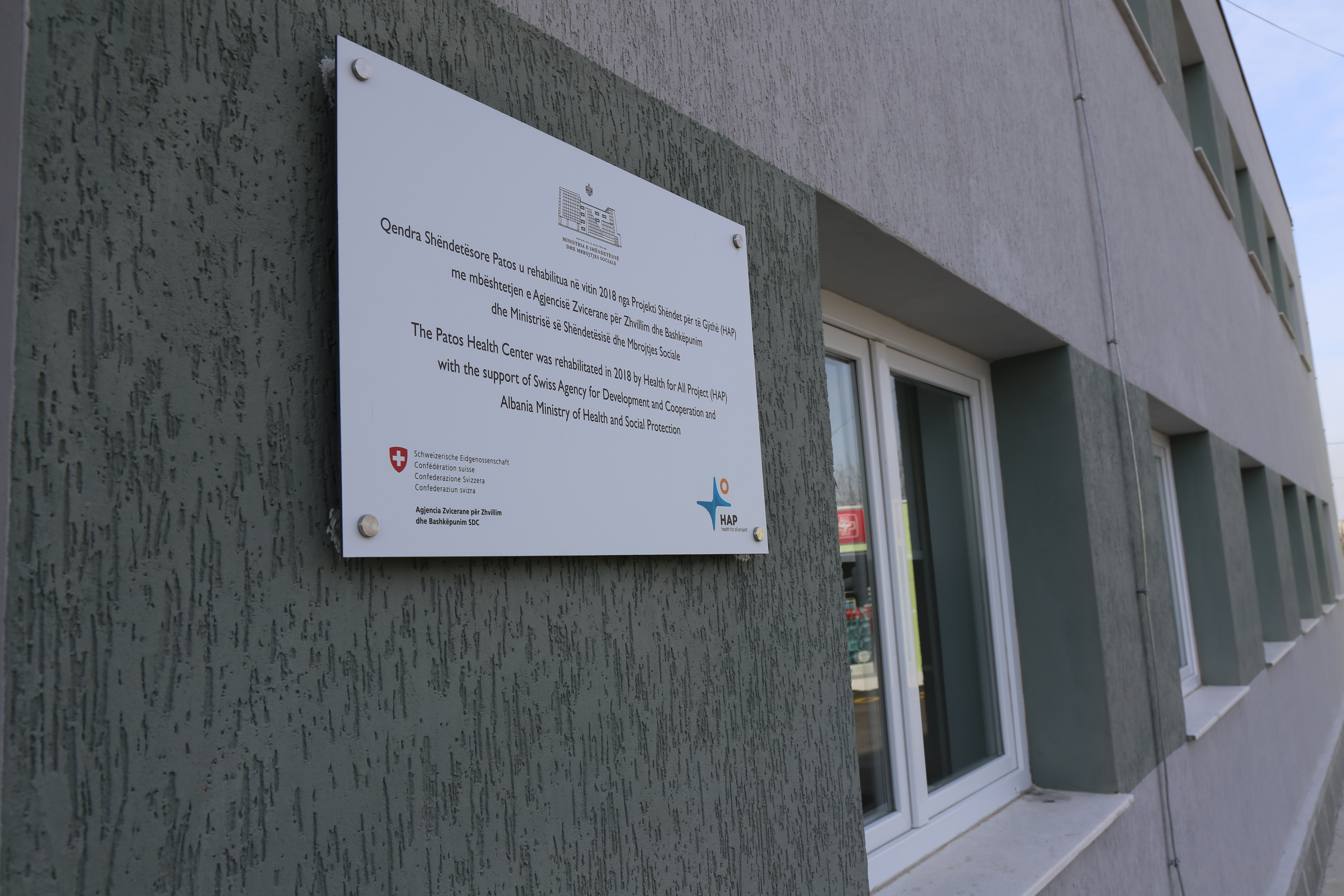
Plaque on the newly renovated health care center in Patos in the region of Fier.

== Phase 1 ==
=== Content ===
During the first phase of the project, a number of interventions were carried out. On the supply side, HAP is working closely with local and national Albanian governmental entities, such as the Ministry of Health and Social Protection (MoHSP), in reforming the health care system including professional development, health governance and financing and the decentralisation of services and functions. Those interventions include the development and introduction of efficient continuing medical education (CME) practices, such as peer review groups, revised accreditation standards and practices on national level or the establishment of a master's programme in health management offered by the University of Medicine and by the University of Tirana.

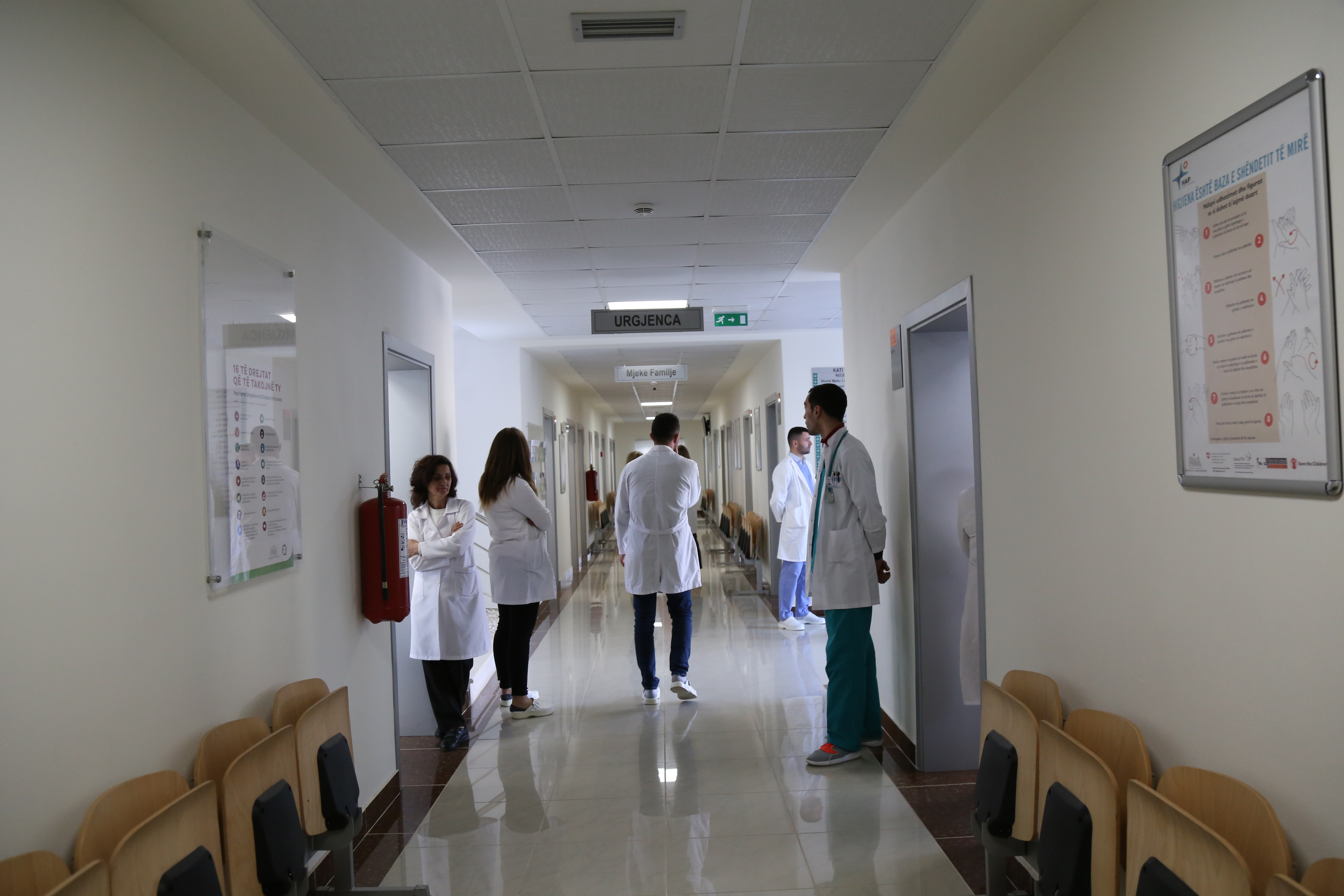
Hallway in the renovated health care center in Patos.

Further, infrastructure has been improved by rehabilitating health centers or the distribution of medical bags for nurses and doctors equipped with state of the art instruments for the daily practice of health professionals.

On the demand side, the project has worked closely with communities applying a bottom-up approach in order to raise awareness for healthier behaviour and risk factors concerning non-communicable diseases, hence enhancing the access of the population to primary health care services, especially in rural areas.

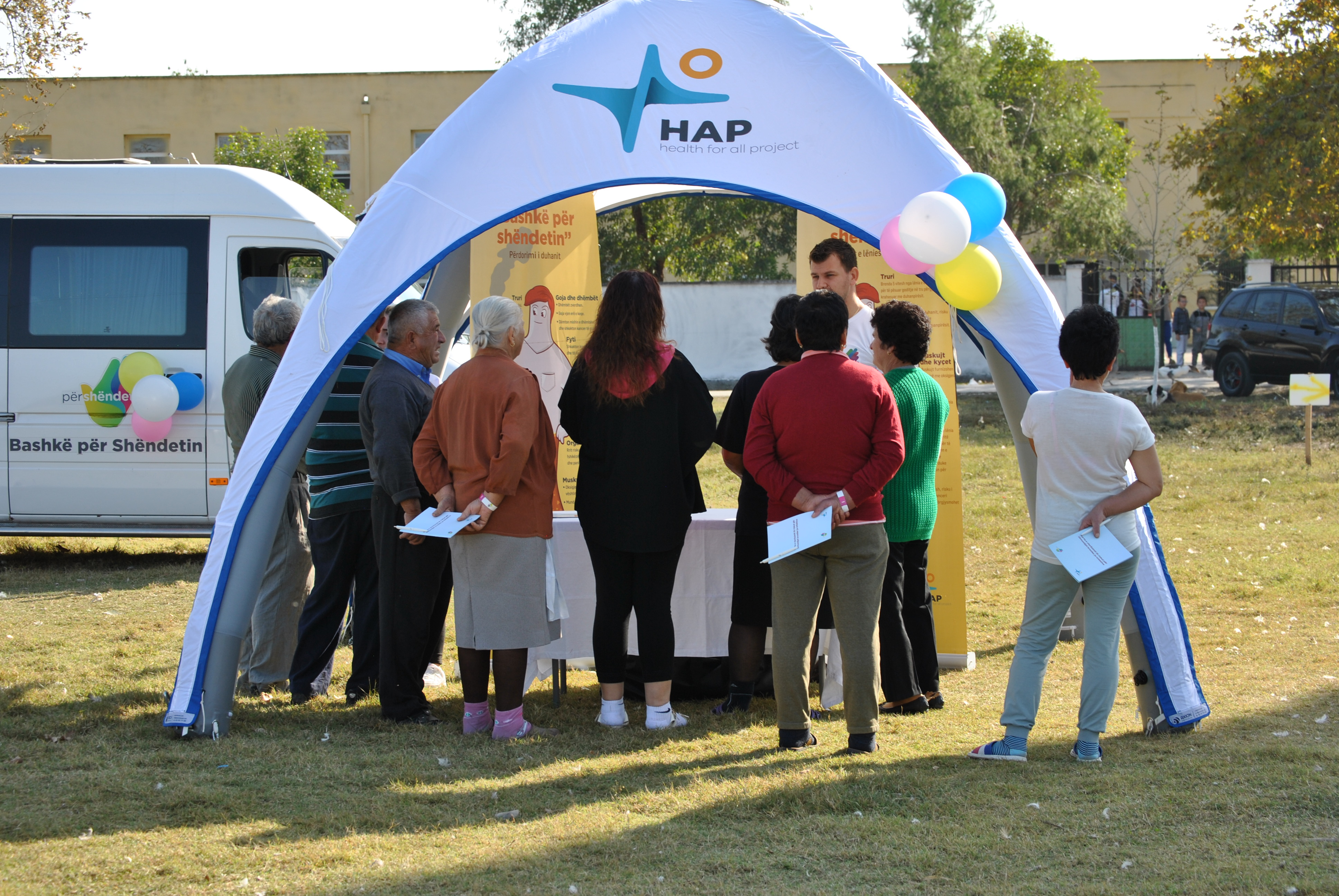
Locals attending an event of the perSHËNDETje campaign promoting a healthy lifestyle.

=== Outcomes ===
After the first phase, the following developments, among others, related to the project's interventions were identified:

- 20% of all health centers covering a total of 27% of the population were renovated and equipped with up to date medical instruments.
- 75% of family physicians and 41% nurses in both target regions participated in newly introduced peer review groups.
- A total of 30% of the population in the target regions was reached by health promotion activities.
- Overall, 93% of the population living in the two focal regions reported to be satisfied with primary health care services.
- The Albanian Demographic and Health Survey (ADHS) 2017-2018 was conducted with support of the project, providing statistical data for policy making.

== Phase 2 ==
=== Content ===
During the second phase of the project, effective interventions will be institutionalised while the renovation and rehabilitation of infrastructure receives less attention. More emphasize is put on effective management and policy making, training of health care professionals and the development of new models for home-based care, for instance. Specifically, the second phase is expected to yield the following outcomes amongst others:

- The master's programme in health management is consolidated and a new master's programme for family nurses established.
- The quality of services delivered is improved through national accreditation processes.
- Continuing medical education interventions (e.g. peer review groups) are scaled up.
- Endorsed by the MoHSP, new models for home based care are outlined, tested and scaled up.

Additionally, during both phases the dismantling of gender stereotypes and good governance on all levels play a transversal role and are supported throughout all interventions. Currently, the second phase of the programm is active.
