= Ornithinimicrobium flavum =

Scientific classification
- Domain: Bacteria
- Kingdom: Bacillati
- Phylum: Actinomycetota
- Class: Actinomycetes
- Order: Micrococcales
- Family: Intrasporangiaceae
- Genus: Ornithinimicrobium
- Species: O. flavum

Binomial name
- Ornithinimicrobium flavum Fang et al. 2017

Type strain
- KCTC 29164; NBRC 109452; CPCC 203535

Species of bacterium

Ornithinimicrobium flavum is a Gram-positive, non-spore-forming and non-motile bacterium species from the genus Ornithinimicrobium which has been isolated from a leaf of the plant Paris polyphylla var. yunnanensis.
