= Ornithinimicrobium pekingense =

Scientific classification
- Domain: Bacteria
- Kingdom: Bacillati
- Phylum: Actinomycetota
- Class: Actinomycetes
- Order: Micrococcales
- Family: Intrasporangiaceae
- Genus: Ornithinimicrobium
- Species: O. pekingense

Binomial name
- Ornithinimicrobium pekingense Liu et al. 2008

Type strain
- CGMCC 1.5362; JCM 14001; LW6

Species of bacterium

Ornithinimicrobium pekingense is a Gram-positive bacterium species from the genus Ornithinimicrobium which has been isolated from activated sludge.
