= Ornithinimicrobium murale =

Scientific classification
- Domain: Bacteria
- Kingdom: Bacillati
- Phylum: Actinomycetota
- Class: Actinomycetes
- Order: Micrococcales
- Family: Intrasporangiaceae
- Genus: Ornithinimicrobium
- Species: O. murale

Binomial name
- Ornithinimicrobium murale Kämpfer et al. 2013

Type strain
- 01-Gi-040; CCM 7610; DSM 22056

Species of bacterium

Ornithinimicrobium murale is a Gram-positive and non-spore-forming bacterium species from the genus Ornithinimicrobium which has been isolated from an indoor wall from Giessen in Germany.
