= Streptomyces jietaisiensis =

Scientific classification
- Domain: Bacteria
- Kingdom: Bacillati
- Phylum: Actinomycetota
- Class: Actinomycetia
- Order: Streptomycetales
- Family: Streptomycetaceae
- Genus: Streptomyces
- Species: S. jietaisiensis

Binomial name
- Streptomyces jietaisiensis He et al. 2005

Species of bacterium

Streptomyces jietaisiensis is an actinomycete, with tpe strain FXJ46^{T} (=AS 4.1859^{T} =JCM 12279^{T}), first isolated from cypress forest soil in northern China.
