= Demequina aestuarii =

Scientific classification
- Domain: Bacteria
- Kingdom: Bacillati
- Phylum: Actinomycetota
- Class: Actinomycetes
- Order: Micrococcales
- Family: Demequinaceae
- Genus: Demequina
- Species: D. aestuarii

Binomial name
- Demequina aestuarii Yi et al. 2007

Type strain
- IMSNU 14027; JCM 12123; KCTC 9919; JC2054

Species of bacterium

Demequina aestuarii is a bacterium from the genus of Demequina which has been isolated from tidal flat sediments from Korea.
