= Serinicoccus =

Scientific classification
- Domain: Bacteria
- Kingdom: Bacillati
- Phylum: Actinomycetota
- Class: Actinomycetes
- Order: Micrococcales
- Family: Ornithinimicrobiaceae
- Genus: Serinicoccus; Yi et al. 2004

Type species
- Serinicoccus marinus Yi et al. 2004

Species
- S. chungangensis Traiwan et al. 2011; S. hydrothermalis Zhang et al. 2020; S. marinus Yi et al. 2004; S. profundi Xiao et al. 2011; S. sediminis Lee et al. 2019

Genus of bacteria

Serinicoccus is a Gram-positive, strictly aerobic and moderately halophilic bacterial genus from the family Ornithinimicrobiaceae. The genus was formerly in the family Intrasporangiaceae, but later genomic data caused it to be reclassified in 2018.
