= Demequina aurantiaca =

Scientific classification
- Domain: Bacteria
- Kingdom: Bacillati
- Phylum: Actinomycetota
- Class: Actinomycetes
- Order: Micrococcales
- Family: Demequinaceae
- Genus: Demequina
- Species: D. aurantiaca

Binomial name
- Demequina aurantiaca Ue et al. 2011

Type strain
- KCTC 19745; MBIC 08347; NBRC 106265; YM12-102

Species of bacterium

Demequina aurantiaca is a Gram-positive bacterium from the genus Demequina which has been isolated from seaweed from the Lake Hamana from Shizuoka in Japan.
