= Demequina activiva =

Scientific classification
- Domain: Bacteria
- Kingdom: Bacillati
- Phylum: Actinomycetota
- Class: Actinomycetes
- Order: Micrococcales
- Family: Demequinaceae
- Genus: Demequina
- Species: D. activiva

Binomial name
- Demequina activiva Park et al. 2015

Type strain
- KCTC 29674; NBRC 110675; BS-12M

Species of bacterium

Demequina activiva is a Gram-positive, facultatively anaerobic, rod-shaped and non-spore-forming bacterium from the genus Demequina which has been isolated from tidal flat sediments from the South Sea in Korea.
