= Demequina litorisediminis =

Scientific classification
- Domain: Bacteria
- Kingdom: Bacillati
- Phylum: Actinomycetota
- Class: Actinomycetes
- Order: Micrococcales
- Family: Demequinaceae
- Genus: Demequina
- Species: D. litorisediminis

Binomial name
- Demequina litorisediminis Park et al. 2016

Type strain
- KCTC 52260; NBRC 112299; GHD-1

Species of bacterium

Demequina litorisediminis is a Gram-positive, facultatively anaerobic and non-spore-forming bacterium from the genus Demequina which has been isolated from tidal flat sediments from the Yellow Sea in Korea.
