= Ornithinimicrobium =

Scientific classification
- Domain: Bacteria
- Kingdom: Bacillati
- Phylum: Actinomycetota
- Class: Actinomycetes
- Order: Micrococcales
- Family: Intrasporangiaceae
- Genus: Ornithinimicrobium; Groth et al. 2001

Type species
- Ornithinimicrobium humiphilum Groth et al. 2001

Species
- O. algicola Ramaprasad et al. 2015; O. avium Lee et al. 2022; O. cavernae Zhang et al. 2019; O. cerasi Fang et al. 2020; O. ciconiae Lee et al. 2022; O. flavum Fang et al. 2017; O. humiphilum Groth et al. 2001; O. kibberense Mayilraj et al. 2006; O. laminariae Cao et al. 2022; O. murale Kämpfer et al. 2013; O. panacihumi Huo et al. 2021; O. pekingense Liu et al. 2008; O. pratense Guo et al. 2020; O. tianjinense Liu et al. 2013

Genus of bacteria

Ornithinimicrobium is a Gram-positive, non-spore-forming and non-motile bacterial genus from the family Ornithinimicrobiaceae. The genus was formerly in the family Intrasporangiaceae, but later genomic data caused it to be reclassified in 2018.
