= Aquiluna =

Scientific classification
- Domain: Bacteria
- Kingdom: Bacillati
- Phylum: Actinomycetota
- Class: Actinomycetes
- Order: Actinomycetales
- Family: incertae sedis
- Genus: Aquiluna; Pitt et al. 2021

Type species
- Aquiluna borgnonia Pitt et al. 2021

Species
- A. borgnonia Pitt et al. 2021; "Ca. A. rubra" Hahn 2009

Synonyms
- "Candidatus Aquiluna" Hahn 2009

Genus of bacteria

Aquiluna is a genus of bacteria from the order Actinomycetales. As of 2022, Aquiluna is a monotypic genus, with the only validly published species being Aquiluna borgonia. The genus was first proposed in 2009, but its type species Candiatus Aquiluna rubra was not validly published.
