= Bogoriellaceae =

Scientific classification
- Domain: Bacteria
- Kingdom: Bacillati
- Phylum: Actinomycetota
- Class: Actinomycetes
- Order: Micrococcales
- Family: Bogoriellaceae; Schumann and Stackebrandt 2000

Type genus
- Bogoriella Groth et al. 1997

Genera
- Bogoriella Groth et al. 1997; Georgenia Altenburger et al. 2002

Family of bacteria

Bogoriellaceae is an Actinomycete family.

== Phylogeny ==
The currently accepted taxonomy is based on the List of Prokaryotic names with Standing in Nomenclature (LPSN) and National Center for Biotechnology Information (NCBI) and the phylogeny is based on 16S rRNA-based LTP release 106 by The All-Species Living Tree Project:

- Bogoriellaceae
  - Bogoriella caseilytica Groth et al. 1997
  - Georgenia
    - G. deserti Chen & Li 2007
    - G. soli Kämpfer et al. 2010
    - - G. muralis Altenburger et al. 2002
      - - G. halophila Tang et al. 2010
        - - G. ruanii Li et al. 2007
          - G. thermotolerans Hamada et al. 2009
