= Cellulomonas =

Scientific classification
- Domain: Bacteria
- Kingdom: Bacillati
- Phylum: Actinomycetota
- Class: Actinomycetes
- Order: Micrococcales
- Family: Cellulomonadaceae
- Genus: Cellulomonas; Bergey et al. 1923 (Approved Lists 1980)

Type species
- Cellulomonas flavigena

Species
- See text.

Genus of bacteria

Cellulomonas is a genus of Gram-positive rod-shaped bacteria. One of their main distinguishing features is their ability to degrade cellulose, using enzymes such as endoglucanase and exoglucanase. They are members of the Actinomycetota.

== Species ==
Cellulomonas comprises the following species:

- C. aerilata Lee et al. 2008
- C. algicola Yamamura et al. 2019
- C. biazotea (Kellerman et al. 1913) Bergey et al. 1923 (Approved Lists 1980)
- C. bogoriensis Jones et al. 2005
- C. carbonis Shi et al. 2012
- C. cellasea (Kellerman et al. 1913) Bergey et al. 1923 (Approved Lists 1980)
- C. chitinilytica Yoon et al. 2008
- C. citrea Lee et al. 2020
- C. composti Kang et al. 2007
- C. denverensis Brown et al. 2005
- C. endophytica Li et al. 2020
- C. fimi (McBeth and Scales 1913) Bergey et al. 1923 (Approved Lists 1980)
- C. flavigena (Kellerman and McBeth 1912) Bergey et al. 1923 (Approved Lists 1980)
- C. fulva Dahal et al. 2022
- C. gelida (Kellerman et al. 1913) Bergey et al. 1923 (Approved Lists 1980)
- "C. gilvus" Christopherson et al. 2013
- C. hominis Funke et al. 1996
- C. humilata corrig. (Gledhill and Casida 1969) Collins and Pascual 2000
- C. iranensis Elberson et al. 2000
- "C. macrotermitis" Sun et al. 2018
- C. marina Zhang et al. 2013
- C. massiliensis Lagier et al. 2015
- C. oligotrophica Hatayama et al. 2013
- C. pakistanensis Ahmed et al. 2014
- C. palmilytica Siriatcharanon et al. 2022
- C. persica Elberson et al. 2000
- C. phragmiteti Rusznyák et al. 2011
- C. rhizosphaerae Tian et al. 2019
- C. shaoxiangyii Tian et al. 2020
- C. soli Hatayama et al. 2013
- "C. taurus" Zhang et al. 2021
- C. telluris Shi et al. 2020
- C. terrae An et al. 2005
- "C. timonensis" Ndongo et al. 2018
- C. uda (Kellerman et al. 1913) Bergey et al. 1923 (Approved Lists 1980)
- C. xylanilytica Rivas et al. 2004
