= Ruaniaceae =

Scientific classification
- Domain: Bacteria
- Kingdom: Bacillati
- Phylum: Actinomycetota
- Class: Actinomycetes
- Order: Micrococcales
- Family: Ruaniaceae; Tang et al. 2010

Type genus
- Ruania Gu et al. 2007

Genera
- Occultella Schumann et al. 2021; Ruania Gu et al. 2007

Family of bacteria

Ruaniaceae is an Actinomycete family with two monotypic genera.

== Phylogeny ==
The currently accepted taxonomy is based on the List of Prokaryotic names with Standing in Nomenclature (LPSN) and National Center for Biotechnology Information (NCBI) and the phylogeny is based on 16S rRNA-based LTP release 106 by The All-Species Living Tree Project

- - Ruania alba Tang et al. 2010
  - Ruania albidiflava Gu et al. 2007
