= Pitted keratolysis =

- Other names: Keratolysis plantare sulcatum, Keratoma plantare sulcatum, Ringed keratolysis, and sweaty sock syndrome
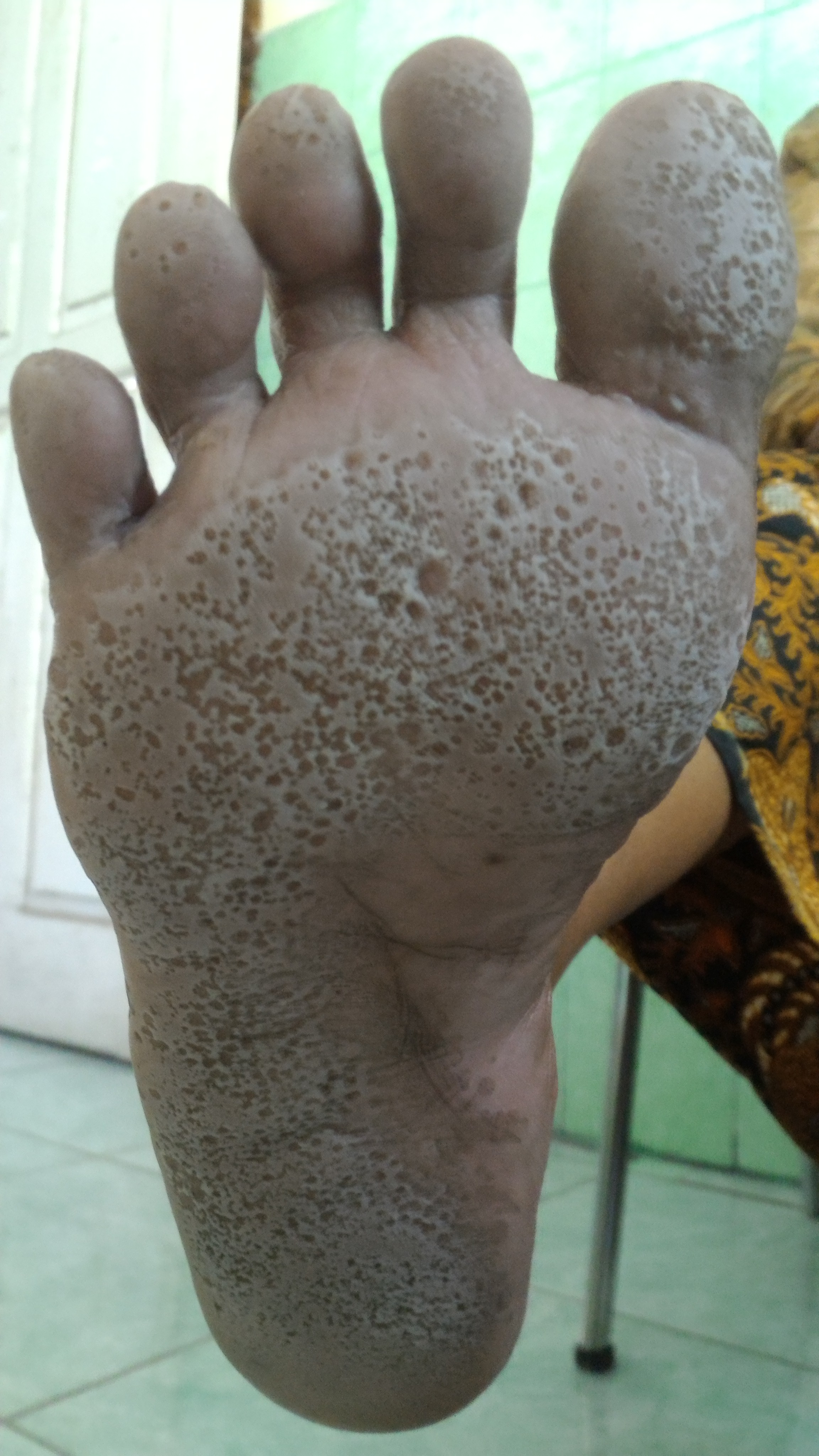
- Right foot affected with pitted keratolysis
- Specialty: Dermatology
- Symptoms: Large, crater-like holes on the foot
- Causes: Corynebacterium species and other bacteria
- Differential diagnosis: Athlete's foot (Tinea pedis), erythrasma, hyperhidrosis
- Prevention: Keeping the feet dry, antiperspirants
- Treatment: Antibiotics

Pitted keratolysis (also known as keratolysis plantare sulcatum, keratoma plantare sulcatum, and ringed keratolysis) is a bacterial skin infection of the foot. The infection is characterized by craterlike pits on the sole of the feet and toes, particularly weight-bearing areas.

The infection is caused by Kytococcus sedentarius. Excessive sweating of the feet and use of occlusive footwear provide an environment in which these bacteria thrive and therefore increase the risk of developing pitted keratolysis.

The condition is fairly common, especially in the military where wet shoes/boots are worn for extended periods of time without removing/cleaning. Skin biopsy specimens are not usually utilized, as the diagnosis of pitted keratolysis is often made by visual examination and recognition of the characteristic odor. Wood's lamp examination results are inconsistent. Treatment of pitted keratolysis requires the application of antibiotics to the skin such as benzoyl peroxide, clindamycin, erythromycin, fusidic acid, or mupirocin. Prevention efforts aim to keep the feet dry by using moisture-wicking shoes and socks as well as antiperspirants.

== Signs and symptoms ==
Pitted keratolysis typically presents with white discoloration of the skin and numerous discrete, "punched-out" pitted lesions or erosions, usually located on the soles of the feet. The pits are typically 1–7 millimeters in diameter. These circular and shallow pits are characteristic of pitted keratolysis, and often overlap to produce larger areas of erosion. The appearance of this condition’s characteristic lesions becomes more pronounced when the affected area is wet or submerged in water. Occasionally these lesions present with a green or brown hue around and within the pits.

These superficial erosions are found under the toes and on the soles of the feet, and especially at the pressure bearing points such as the heel. Typically, both feet are equally affected. Rarely, the condition affects the palms.

== Cause ==
The most common cause of pitted keratolysis is Kytococcus sedentarius. However, several other bacteria may also cause the condition, particularly Actinomyces keratolytica, Dermatophilus congolensis, and Streptomyces. Less frequently, it is due to Acinetobacter, Clostridium, Klebsiella, and Pseudomonas species.

== Pathogenesis ==
Pitted keratolysis is associated with excessive sweating of the palms or soles (palmoplantar hyperhidrosis.) The pits seen in pitted keratolysis are caused by bacteria secreting proteinase enzymes which cause the breakdown of the keratin proteins in the stratum corneum layer of the affected skin. This results in the formation of sulfur compounds which lead to a very strong and foul foot odor. The bacteria that cause pitted keratolysis thrive in warm and humid environments. Irritation is generally minimal, though occasionally burning, itching, and soreness are experienced with pitted keratolysis.

== Diagnosis ==
The diagnosis of pitted keratolysis is based primarily on the physical examination, with recognition of the classic pitted lesions and pungent odor. Dermoscopic examination can facilitate visualization of pits and pit walls. A Wood's lamp may show coral red fluorescence, as seen in erythrasma. However, this finding is not uniformly present, as the condition may be caused by bacteria that do not produce fluorescent pigments. Further laboratory testing is not typically required for the diagnosis. However, a potassium hydroxide preparation can help rule out the presence of a fungal infection. Imaging and biopsy are not necessary.

=== Differential diagnosis ===
- Acid
- Athlete's foot (Tinea pedis)
- Erythrasma
- Hyperhidrosis

== Treatment ==
As of 2014, there is little high-quality evidence to provide guidance and support one treatment method over another. Therefore, the optimal treatment approach for pitted keratolysis remains unclear as the condition has not been well-studied. One review suggested a treatment approach requiring modification of risk factors (e.g., keeping feet clean and dry) and treating the underlying bacterial infection. Effective antibiotic options include clindamycin, erythromycin, mupirocin, and fusidic acid. Topical clindamycin is generally preferred as the first-line choice due to lower cost and better availability. Fusidic acid is preferred over mupirocin in most cases due to less resistance to fusidic acid amongst Methicillin-sensitive staphylococcus aureus and Methicillin-resistant staphylococcus aureus. Benzoyl peroxide is an effective alternative over-the-counter option and is thought to be as effective as topical clindamycin. Clinical cure was typically seen after 2.5–3 weeks. Oral antibiotics are not typically recommended.

Foot hygiene is important. The feet may be washed at least daily with soap and water, and dried thoroughly afterwards. Moisture-wicking socks and shoes may be worn and antiperspirants, such as aluminum chlorohydrate, may help to keep the feet dry. Injections of botulinum toxin have successfully induced cessation of sweating (anhidrosis) of the soles of the feet and led to resolution of pitted keratolysis. These injections are typically reserved for refractory cases of pitted keratolysis that have failed to respond to environmental modifications and antibiotics due to the high cost and pain associated with botulinum toxin injections.

Pitted keratolysis can be reduced and eventually stopped by regularly applying a liberal amount of antiperspirant body powder to the inside of the shoes and socks of the affected person. Regular powder application will greatly reduce foot perspiration and keep the plantar surface of the foot dry therefore creating an environment hostile to the Corynebacterium.

== Epidemiology ==
Pitted keratolysis occurs worldwide and in various climates. The infection is more common in people who live in tropical climates and walk barefoot, and those who spend a lot of time wearing occlusive footwear (e.g., tight shoes, rubber boots), such as in the military where wet shoes are worn for a prolonged period of time without removing and proper hygiene.

== History ==
Pitted keratolysis was first described by Castellani in 1910 and named keratoma plantare sulcatum .

== See also ==
- List of cutaneous conditions
