= Brevibacterium =

Scientific classification
- Domain: Bacteria
- Kingdom: Bacillati
- Phylum: Actinomycetota
- Class: Actinomycetes
- Order: Micrococcales
- Family: Brevibacteriaceae
- Genus: Brevibacterium; Breed 1953

Type species
- Brevibacterium linens (Wolff 1910) Breed 1953 (Approved Lists 1980)

Species
- See text.

Genus of bacteria

Brevibacterium is a genus of bacteria of the order Micrococcales. They are Gram-positive soil organisms.

== Species ==
Brevibacterium comprises the following species:

- B. album Tang et al. 2008
- B. ammoniilyticum Kim et al. 2013
- B. anseongense Jung et al. 2019
- B. antiquum Gavrish et al. 2005
- B. atlanticum Pei et al. 2022
- B. aurantiacum Gavrish et al. 2005
- "B. aureum" Seghal Kiran et al. 2010
- B. avium Pascual and Collins 1999
- B. casei Collins et al. 1983
- B. celere Ivanova et al. 2004
- B. daeguense Cui et al. 2013
- B. epidermidis Collins et al. 1983
- B. hankyongi Choi et al. 2018
- "B. ihuae" Valles et al. 2018
- B. iodinum (ex Davis 1939) Collins et al. 1981
- B. jeotgali Choi et al. 2013
- "B. ketoglutamicum" Stackebrandt and Woese 1981
- B. limosum Pei et al. 2022
- B. linens (Wolff 1910) Breed 1953 (Approved Lists 1980)
- B. luteolum corrig. Wauters et al. 2003
- B. marinum Lee 2008
- B. mcbrellneri McBride et al. 1994
- "B. metallicus" Roman-Ponce et al. 2015
- "B. methylicum" Nesvera et al. 1991
- B. oceani Bhadra et al. 2008
- B. otitidis Pascual et al. 1996
- B. paucivorans Wauters et al. 2001
- B. permense Gavrish et al. 2005
- B. picturae Heyrman et al. 2004
- "B. pigmentatum" Pei et al. 2021
- B. pityocampae Kati et al. 2010
- B. profundi Pei et al. 2020
- B. ravenspurgense Mages et al. 2009
- "B. renqingii" Yan et al. 2021
- B. rongguiense Deng et al. 2020
- B. salitolerans Guan et al. 2010
- B. samyangense Lee 2006
- B. sandarakinum Kämpfer et al. 2010
- B. sanguinis Wauters et al. 2004
- B. sediminis Chen et al. 2016
- B. senegalense Kokcha et al. 2013
- B. siliguriense Kumar et al. 2013
- B. yomogidense Tonouchi et al. 2013
