= Rudolf Geigy =

Swiss zoologist

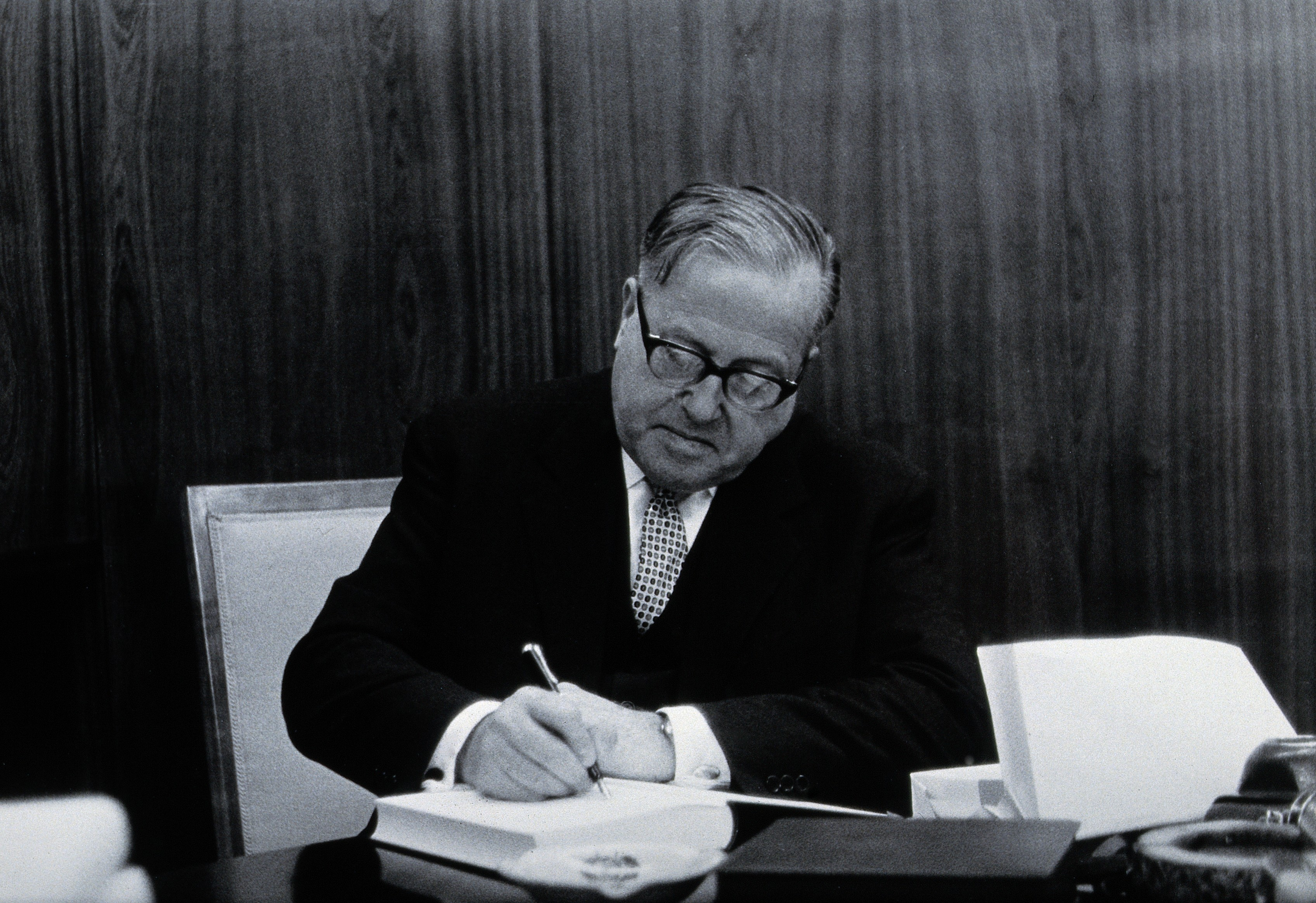
- Born: 20 December 1902; Basel, Switzerland
- Died: 8 March 1995 (aged 92)
- Scientific career
- Fields: biology, medicine, vector-borne diseases

Rudolf Geigy (20 December 1902 – 8 March 1995) was a Swiss biologist and a professor of embryology and genetics at the University of Basel. He established the Swiss Tropical and Public Health Institute and studied tropical diseases.

== Life and career ==
Geigy was born in Basel, Switzerland on 20 December 1902. He was the grandson of Johann Rudolf Geigy-Merian and son of (same name) Johann Rudolf Geigy-Merian and Helene Schlumberger who belonged to the family that established Geigy, a major pharmaceutical firm. He studied zoology at Basel and Geneva. In 1938 he became an associate professor of embryology and genetics at the University of Basel. In 1943 he established the Swiss Tropical Institute (now Swiss Tropical and Public Health Institute) in Basel where he was a director until 1972. He also established the Ifakara Health Institute in Ifakara, Tanzania after a visit in 1949, and a research institute on the Ivory Coast. He studied malaria, sleeping sickness, and river blindness. He specialized in disease-transmitting vectors including tsetse flies, mites, and ticks.

Geigy married three times with three daughters and a son from the second wife. He then married Charlotte Hunziker in 1972. On 8 March 1995, due to health issues, the couple chose to die by assisted suicide through the euthanasia organization Exit (Switzerland), which led to a major debate on euthanasia in Switzerland.

During his life, Geigy helped establish a number of institutions which have since merged. The Rudolf Geigy Foundation continues to give awards named for Geigy to scholars researching tropical and neglected diseases, specifically those who combine field and laboratory work in novel ways, honoring Geigy's legacy of doing so himself.

== See also ==
- Neglected tropical disease research and development
