= Georgenia =

Scientific classification
- Domain: Bacteria
- Kingdom: Bacillati
- Phylum: Actinomycetota
- Class: Actinomycetes
- Order: Micrococcales
- Family: Bogoriellaceae
- Genus: Georgenia; Altenburger et al. 2002

Type species
- Georgenia muralis Altenburger et al. 2002

Species
- G. alba Li et al. 2019; G. daeguensis Woo et al. 2012; G. deserti Hozzein et al. 2018; "G. faecalis" Wang et al. 2020; G. halophila Tang et al. 2010; G. muralis Altenburger et al. 2002; G. ruanii Li et al. 2007; G. satyanarayanai Srinivas et al. 2012; G. sediminis You et al. 2013; G. soli Kämpfer et al. 2010; G. subflava Wang et al. 2015; G. thermotolerans Hamada et al. 2009; G. wutianyii Tian et al. 2020; G. yuyongxinii Tian et al. 2020

Synonyms
- Oceanitalea Fu et al. 2012

Genus of bacteria

Georgenia is a genus of bacteria in the phylum Actinomycetota.
