= Kytococcus =

Scientific classification
- Domain: Bacteria
- Kingdom: Bacillati
- Phylum: Actinomycetota
- Class: Actinomycetes
- Order: Micrococcales
- Family: Kytococcaceae; Nouioui et al. 2018
- Genus: Kytococcus; Stackebrandt et al. 1995

Species
- K. aerolatus corrig. Kämpfer et al. 2009; K. schroeteri Becker et al. 2002; K. sedentarius (ZoBell and Upham 1944) Stackebrandt et al. 1995

Genus of bacteria

Kytococcus is a genus of bacteria in the phylum Actinomycetota.
