= Jonesiaceae =

Scientific classification
- Domain: Bacteria
- Kingdom: Bacillati
- Phylum: Actinomycetota
- Class: Actinomycetes
- Order: Micrococcales
- Family: Jonesiaceae; Stackebrandt et al. 1997

Type genus
- Jonesia Rocourt and Stackebrandt 1987

Genera
- Flavimobilis Nouioui et al. 2018; Jonesia Rocourt and Stackebrandt 1987; Populibacterium Li et al. 2016; Sanguibacter Fernández-Garayzábal et al. 1995; Timonella Mishra et al. 2016

Synonyms
- Sanguibacteraceae Stackebrandt and Schumann 2000

Family of bacteria

Jonesiaceae is a family of Actinomycetota.
