= Rarobacteraceae =

Scientific classification
- Domain: Bacteria
- Kingdom: Bacillati
- Phylum: Actinomycetota
- Class: Actinomycetes
- Order: Micrococcales
- Family: Rarobacteraceae; Stackebrandt and Schumann 2000
- Genus: Rarobacter; Yamamoto et al. 1988

Type species
- Rarobacter faecitabidus Yamamoto et al. 1988

Species
- Rarobacter faecitabidus Yamamoto et al. 1988; Rarobacter incanus Yamamoto et al. 1994

Family of bacteria

Rarobacteraceae is a monotypic Actinomycetota family.

== Phylogeny ==
The currently accepted taxonomy is based on the List of Prokaryotic names with Standing in Nomenclature (LPSN) and National Center for Biotechnology Information (NCBI) and the phylogeny is based on 16S rRNA-based LTP release 106 by The All-Species Living Tree Project

- Rarobacter
  - R. faecitabidus Yamamoto et al. 1988
  - R. incanus Yamamoto et al. 1994
