= Demequina =

Scientific classification
- Domain: Bacteria
- Kingdom: Bacillati
- Phylum: Actinomycetota
- Class: Actinomycetes
- Order: Micrococcales
- Family: Demequinaceae; Ue et al. 2011
- Genus: Demequina; Yi et al. 2007

Type species
- Demequina aestuarii Yi et al. 2007

Species
- See text.

Synonyms
- Lysinimicrobium Hamada et al. 2012

Genus of bacteria

Demequina is a genus of bacteria in the phylum Actinomycetota.

== Etymology ==
The name Demequina derives from:

Neo-Latin feminine gender noun Demequina, arbitrary name derived from demethylmenaquinone, an unusual quinone found in this organism.

== Species ==
Demequina comprises the following species:

- D. activiva Park et al. 2015
- D. aestuarii Yi et al. 2007
- D. aurantiaca Ue et al. 2011
- D. flava Hamada et al. 2013
- D. gelatinilytica (Hamada et al. 2015) Nouioui et al. 2018
- D. globuliformis Ue et al. 2011
- D. iriomotensis (Hamada et al. 2015) Nouioui et al. 2018
- D. litorisediminis Park et al. 2016
- D. lutea Finster et al. 2009
- D. mangrovi (Hamada et al. 2012) Nouioui et al. 2018
- D. maris Nouioui et al. 2018
- D. oxidasica Ue et al. 2011
- D. pelophila (Hamada et al. 2015) Nouioui et al. 2018
- D. phytophila Nouioui et al. 2018
- D. rhizosphaerae (Hamada et al. 2015) Nouioui et al. 2018
- D. salsinemoris Matsumoto et al. 2010
- D. sediminicola Hamada et al. 2013
- D. sediminis (Hamada et al. 2017) Yang and Zhi 2020
- D. silvatica Nouioui et al. 2018
- D. soli (Hamada et al. 2015) Nouioui et al. 2018
- D. subtropica (Hamada et al. 2015) Nouioui et al. 2018

== Phylogeny ==
The currently accepted taxonomy is based on the List of Prokaryotic names with Standing in Nomenclature (LPSN) and the phylogeny is based on 16S rRNA-based LTP release 106 by The All-Species Living Tree Project

- Demequina
  - ?Demequina aurantiaca Ue et al. 2011
  - ?Demequina globuliformis Ue et al. 2011
  - ?Demequina oxidasica Ue et al. 2011
  - D. aestuarii Yi et al. 2007
  - - D. lutea Finster et al. 2009
    - D. salsinemoris Matsumoto et al. 2010

== See also ==
- Bacterial taxonomy
- Microbiology
