= Pálpusztai cheese =

Hungarian cheese

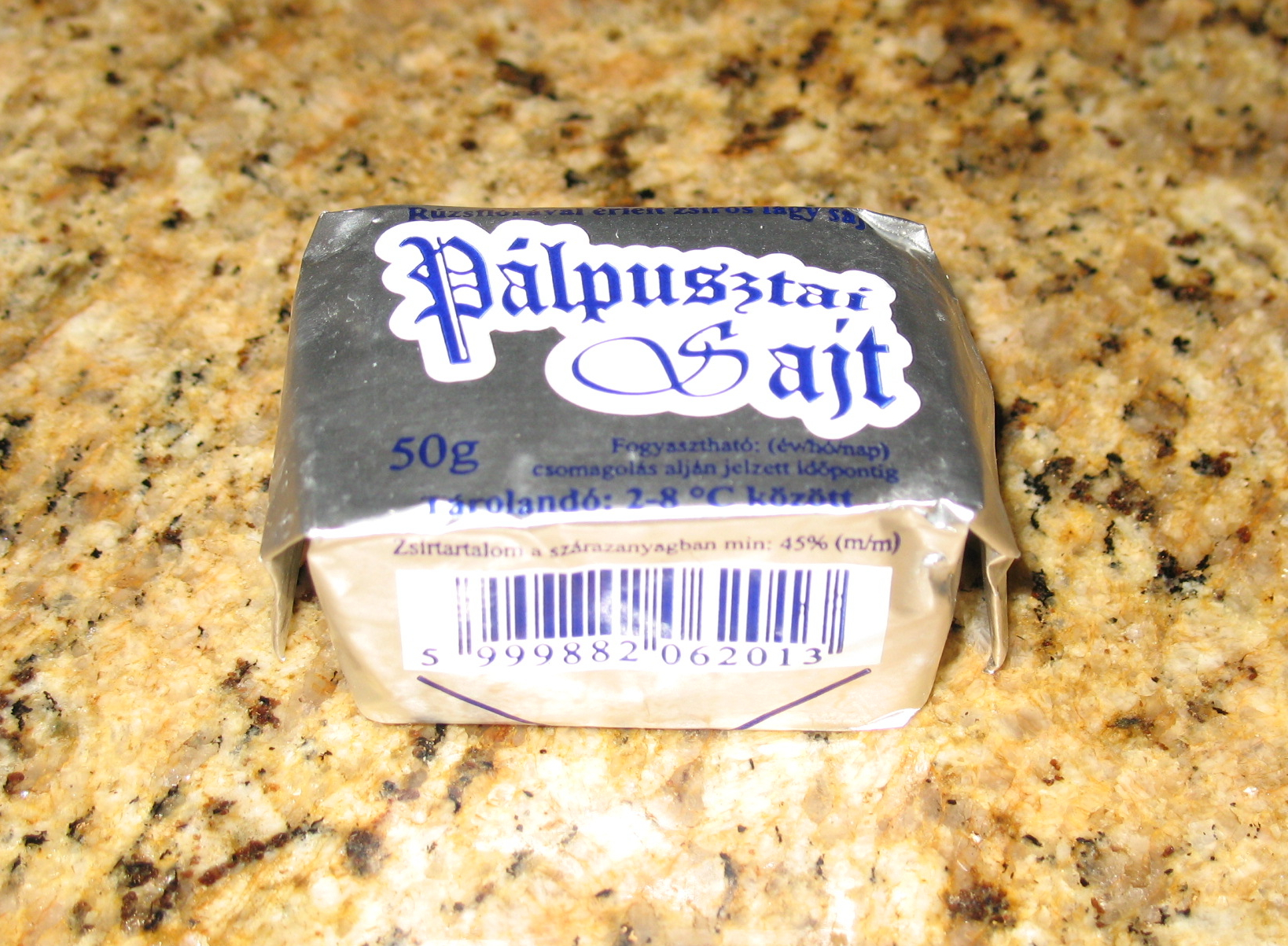
Pálpusztai in its wrapper

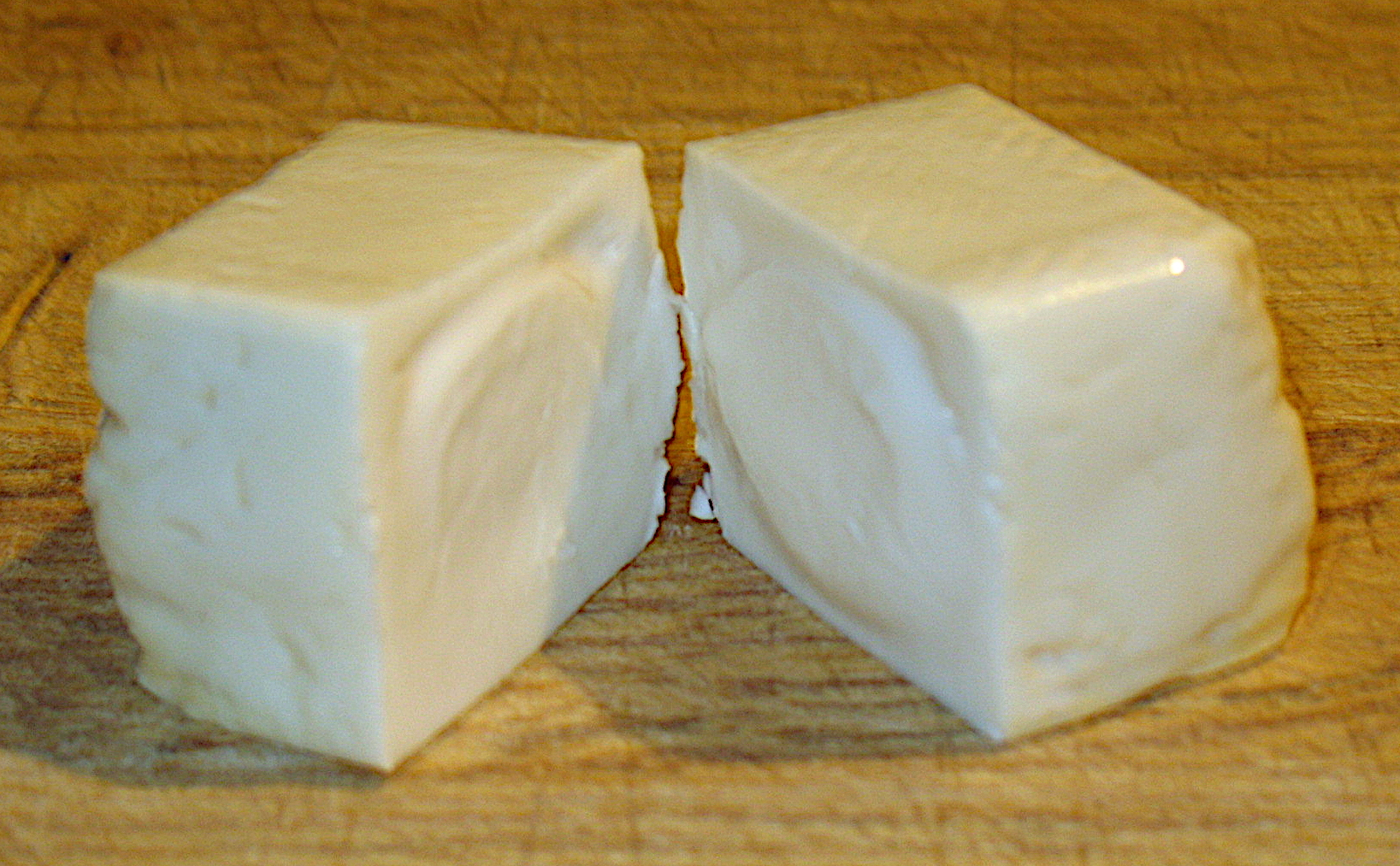
Pálpusztai unwrapped

Pálpusztai is a Hungarian soft cow's milk cheese, known for its pungent odor.

It was developed by Pál Heller of the Derby és Vajtermelő Cheese Co. in the 1890s. Heller named the cheese after himself (Pál), not after any real place.

Pálpusztai is created, like Limburger cheese, by the bacterium Brevibacterium linens which gives the cheese its pungent smell - the same one found on human skin that is partially responsible for body odor.

The small 50 gram cheeses get to the market after a maturation time of 2-3 weeks. Its surface is yellowish, slightly slimy. Its paste is creamy, almost runny and dissolves softly in the mouth. It is distinctively piquant and its flavour resembles ammonia.

== See also ==
- List of cheeses
