= Ifakara Health Institute =

Tanzanian health research organization

Coordinates: 6°45′58.95″S 39°15′15.16″E

- Ifakara Health Institute logo
- Established: 1956
- Founder: Rudolf Geigy
- Key people: Raphael Laizer, Chief Operating Officer; Ally Olotu, Director of Science; Honorati Masanja, Chief Executive Director
- Staff: nearly 600 (in 2009)
- Website: www.ihi.or.tz
- Formerly called: Ifakara Health Research and Development Centre

The Ifakara Health Institute (IHI) is a health research organization with offices in Ifakara, Dar es Salaam, Ikwiriri, Bagamoyo, and Mtwara, Tanzania. The institute conducts health-related research in a variety of areas, including malaria and HIV/AIDS.

== History ==
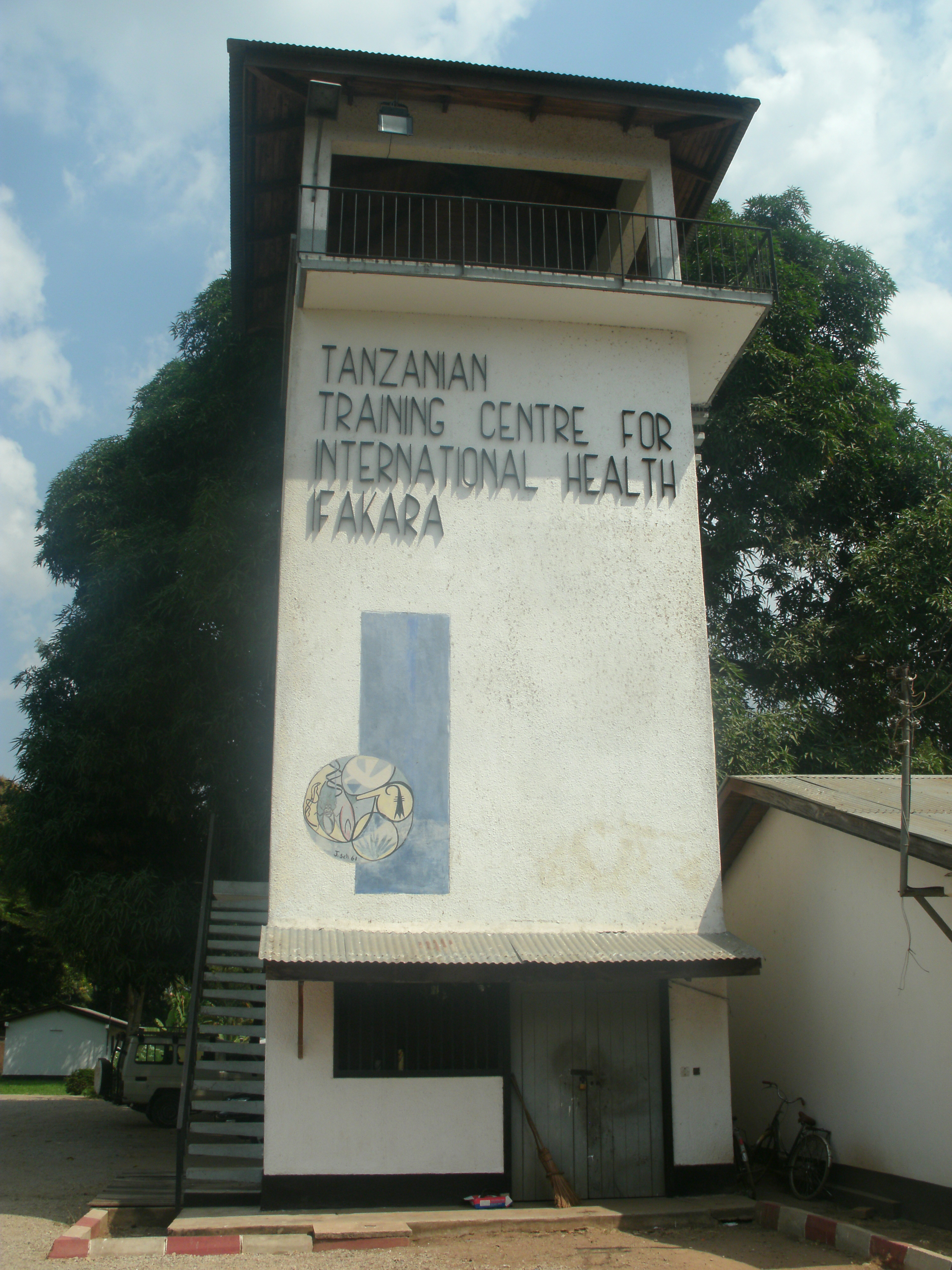
Tower at the Ifakara Health Institute campus in Ifakara, Tanzania.

A field laboratory of the Swiss Tropical and Public Health Institute was founded in Ifakara in 1956 by Rudolf Geigy. From 1981-1984, it was led by Marcel Tanner. It was renamed the "Ifakara Centre" in 1991, the "Ifakara Health Research and Development Centre, IHRDC" in 1996, and the "Ifakara Health Institute" in 2008.

The Ifakara Health Institute was featured in the Al Jazeera Lifelines documentary The End Game in 2014. Fredros Okumu gave a talk featuring the IHI at the TEDGlobal conference in 2017.
