= Parasites & Vectors =

- Discipline: Parasitology
- Language: English
- Edited by: Filipe Dantas-Torres

Publication details
- History: 2008; 18 years ago – present
- Publisher: BioMed Central
- Open access: Yes
- License: Creative Commons Attribution 2.0
- Impact factor: 3.2 - 2-year Impact Factor (2022)

Standard abbreviations
- ISO 4: Parasites Vectors
- NLM: Parasit Vectors

Indexing
- ISSN: 1756-3305
- LCCN: 2008243698
- OCLC no.: 212423889

Links
- Journal homepage

Parasites & Vectors is a peer-reviewed open-access medical journal published by BioMed Central. The journal publishes articles on the biology of parasites, parasitic diseases, intermediate hosts, vectors and vector-borne pathogens. Parasites & Vectors was established in 2008 as a merger of Filaria Journal and Kinetoplastid Biology, and its launch editor-in-chief was Chris Arme. Since 2013 it has published an associated blog for the parasites and vectors community called BugBitten, and it awards the 'Odile Bain Memorial Prize' (OBMP) to perpetuate the memory of the parasitologist Odile Bain who died in 2012.
