= Swiss Tropical and Public Health Institute =

Institute of the University of Basel

Coordinates: 47.56002°N 7.55043°E

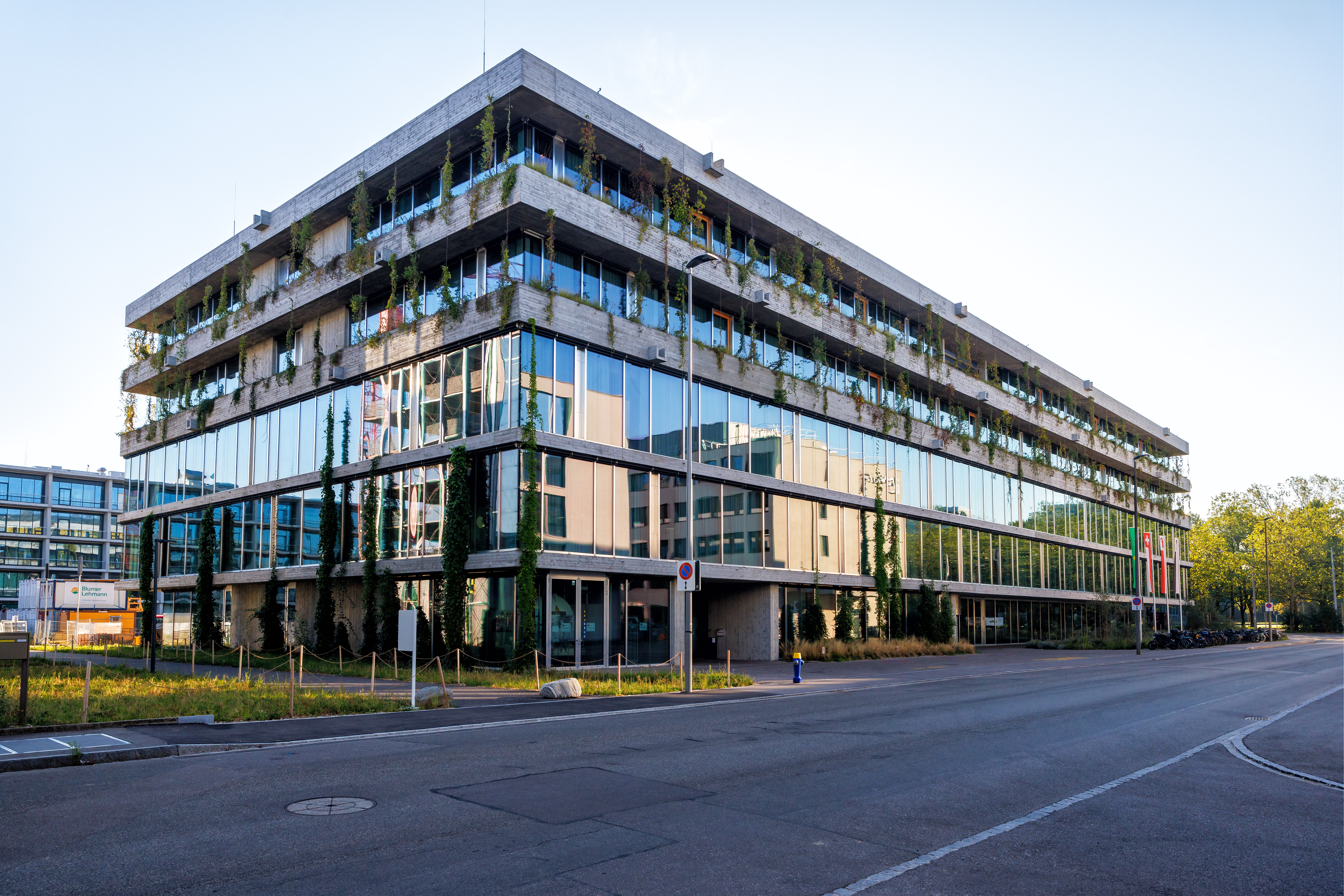
Swiss TPH headquarter building "Belo Horizonte" in Allschwil, Switzerland.

The Swiss TPH (Swiss Tropical and Public Health Institute) is a multi-disciplinary global health institute, founded in 1943 through the initiative of Rudolf Geigy, to improve the health of people in Switzerland and worldwide through research, education and services.

In April 2022, Swiss TPH moved its headquarters from Basel to Allschwil (Canton of Basel-Landschaft). In 2009, the Institute for Social and Preventive Medicine of the University of Basel was integrated into the Swiss Tropical Institute, and in January 2010 changed its name to the Swiss Tropical and Public Health Institute (Swiss TPH).

Swiss TPH is an independent public-law institution associated with the University of Basel. As a public organization it is partially supported by the State Secretariat for Education, Research and Innovation, the Canton of Basel-Stadt and the Canton of Basel-Landschaft. The greater part of its funding comes from competitively acquired research and project funds.

== Research ==
Swiss TPH's researchers focus on various topics including parasitology, infection biology, epidemiology, public health, health systems and economics. Swiss TPH works along a value-chain from innovation to validation to application. Scientists work both in the lab and the field.

== Education ==
As an associated institute of the University of Basel, Swiss TPH conducts programs and courses in international health, epidemiology, public health, infection biology, clinical practice, and management. Swiss TPH offers Bachelor programmes in Infection Biology and Medicine; Master's programmes in Epidemiology, Infection Biology, Medicine and African Studies; PhD programmes in Infection Biology, Health Sciences, Epidemiology, Public Health and Insurance Medicine; as well as an MD PhD programme.

== Services ==
Swiss TPH offers consultancy and project implementation services, medical consultations (travel and tropical medicine), clinical trials and diagnostic services. Project implementation includes policy, strategic and operational advice as well as project design and management in the area of public and global health. Swiss TPH conducts clinical trials for new drugs, diagnostics and vaccines. The Swiss TPH Diagnostic Centre is specialised in diagnosing infectious tropical diseases.

Swiss TPH's Centre for Tropical and Travel Medicine in Basel advises travellers in Switzerland and diagnoses and treats patients after travelling.

== See also ==
- University of Basel
- Science and technology in Switzerland
