= Ornithinimicrobiaceae =

Scientific classification
- Domain: Bacteria
- Kingdom: Bacillati
- Phylum: Actinomycetota
- Class: Actinomycetes
- Order: Micrococcales
- Family: Ornithinimicrobiaceae; Nouioui et al. 2018

Type genus
- Ornithinimicrobium Groth et al. 2001

Genera
- Ornithinimicrobium Groth et al. 2001; Serinicoccus Yi et al. 2004

Family of bacteria

Ornithinimicrobiaceae is a family of bacteria. It was erected in 2018 after a large genome-based study of the Actinobacteria.
