= Brevibacteriaceae =

Scientific classification
- Domain: Bacteria
- Kingdom: Bacillati
- Phylum: Actinomycetota
- Class: Actinomycetes
- Order: Micrococcales
- Family: Brevibacteriaceae; Breed 1953 (Approved Lists 1980)

Type genus
- Brevibacterium Breed 1953 (Approved Lists 1980)

Genera
- Brevibacterium Breed 1953 (Approved Lists 1980); Sediminivirga Zhang et al. 2016; Spelaeicoccus Lee 2013

Family of bacteria

Brevibacteriaceae is a family of Actinomycetota bacteria.
