= Cellulomonadaceae =

Scientific classification
- Domain: Bacteria
- Kingdom: Bacillati
- Phylum: Actinomycetota
- Class: Actinomycetes
- Order: Micrococcales
- Family: Cellulomonadaceae; Stackebrandt and Prauser 1991

Type genus
- Cellulomonas Bergey et al. 1923 (Approved Lists 1980)

Genera
- Actinotalea Yi et al. 2007; Cellulomonas Bergey et al. 1923 (Approved Lists 1980); Pseudactinotalea Cho et al. 2017

Synonyms
- Actinotaleaceae Salam et al. 2020

Family of bacteria

The Cellulomonadaceae are a family of bacteria.
