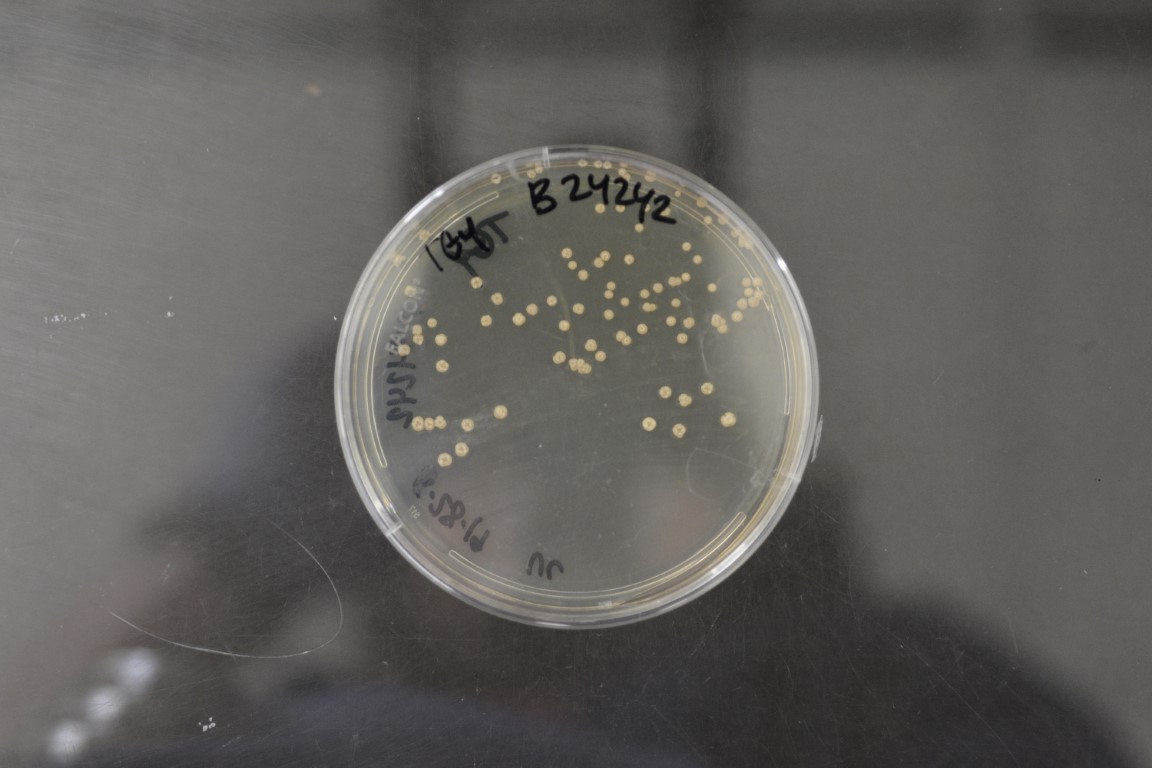
- Microbacterium gubbeenense on agar plate

Scientific classification
- Domain: Bacteria
- Kingdom: Bacillati
- Phylum: Actinomycetota
- Class: Actinomycetes
- Order: Micrococcales; Prévot 1940 (Approved Lists 1980)

Type genus
- Micrococcus Cohn 1872 (Approved Lists 1980)

Families
- Beutenbergiaceae; Bogoriellaceae; Brevibacteriaceae; Cellulomonadaceae; Demequinaceae; Dermabacteraceae; Dermacoccaceae; Dermatophilaceae; Intrasporangiaceae; Jonesiaceae; Kytococcaceae; Microbacteriaceae; Micrococcaceae; Ornithinimicrobiaceae; Promicromonosporaceae; Rarobacteraceae; Ruaniaceae; "Tropherymataceae"

Synonyms
- Aquipuribacterales Salam et al. 2020; Beutenbergiales Salam et al. 2020; Bogoriellales Salam et al. 2020; Brevibacteriales Salam et al. 2020; Cellulomonadales Salam et al. 2020; Demequinales Salam et al. 2020; Dermabacterales Salam et al. 2020; Dermatophilales Salam et al. 2020; Microbacteriales Salam et al. 2020; Micrococcineae Stackebrandt et al. 1997; Ruaniales Salam et al. 2020

= Micrococcales =

Family of bacteria

The Micrococcales are an order of bacteria in the phylum Actinomycetota.

== Phylogeny ==
The currently accepted taxonomy is based on the List of Prokaryotic names with Standing in Nomenclature (LPSN) and National Center for Biotechnology Information (NCBI)

Whole-genome based phylogeny

- - - Microbacteriales
      - "Tropherymataceae"
      - Microbacteriaceae
  - - - Kineosporiales
        - "Quadrisphaeraceae" [incl. "Kineococcaceae"]
        - - Kineosporiaceae
          - - - Kytococcaceae
              - Ornithinimicrobiaceae
            - - Dermatophilaceae
              - - Dermacoccaceae
                - Intrasporangiaceae
    - - - - Bifidobacteriales
            Bifidobacteriaceae
          - Actinomycetales
            Actinomycetaceae
        - - Cellulomonadales
            - Demequinaceae
            - - - Beutenbergiaceae
                - - Bogoriellaceae
                  - Ruaniaceae
              - - Cellulomonadaceae
                - - Jonesiaceae
                  - Promicromonosporaceae
      - - Micrococcales
          - Dermabacteraceae
          - - Brevibacteriaceae
            - Micrococcaceae

16S rRNA based LTP_08_2023

- - - Kineosporiales
      Kineosporiaceae [incl. "Kineococcaceae"; "Quadrisphaeraceae"]
  - - - Aquipuribacterales
        Aquipuribacteraceae
    - - Georgenia
      - - Promicromonosporaceae
        - - Actinomycetales
            - Beutenbergiaceae
            - - Bogoriellaceae
              - - Ruaniaceae
                - Actinomycetaceae [incl. Arcanobacteriaceae]
          - Micrococcales
            - - "Angustibacteraceae"
              - Actinotaleaceae
            - - - Jonesiaceae [incl. Rarobacteraceae; Sanguibacteraceae]
                - - Oerskoviaceae
                  - Cellulomonadaceae
              - - - - - Dermatophilaceae [incl. Arsenicicoccaceae]
                      - Dermacoccaceae
                    - - Kytococcaceae
                      - Ornithinimicrobiaceae
                  - Intrasporangiaceae
                - - - Demequinaceae
                    - - Dermabacteraceae
                      - Micrococcaceae [incl. Yaniellaceae]
                  - - Brevibacteriaceae
                    - - Bifidobacteriaceae
                      - Microbacteriaceae [incl. Tropherymataceae]

120 marker proteins based GTDB 08-RS214

- Actinomycetales
  - - Kineosporiineae
      - - Kineosporiaceae
        - "Kineococcaceae"
      - - "Quadrisphaeraceae"
        - - "Angustibacteraceae"
          - Dermatophilaceae [incl. Aquipuribacteraceae; Arsenicicoccaceae; Dermacoccaceae; Kytococcaceae; Ornithinimicrobiaceae; Intrasporangiaceae]
  - - Actinomycetineae
      - Demequinaceae
      - - Cellulomonadaceae [incl. Actinotaleaceae; Jonesiaceae; Oerskoviaceae; Promicromonosporaceae; Rarobacteraceae; Sanguibacteraceae]
        - - Beutenbergiaceae [incl. Ruaniaceae]
          - Actinomycetaceae [incl. Arcanobacteriaceae; Bogoriellaceae]
    - Micrococcineae
      - Dermabacteraceae
      - - - Brevibacteriaceae
          - Micrococcaceae [incl. Yaniellaceae]
        - - Bifidobacteriaceae
          - Microbacteriaceae [incl. Tropherymataceae]
