= Actinomyces massiliensis =

Scientific classification
- Domain: Bacteria
- Kingdom: Bacillati
- Phylum: Actinomycetota
- Class: Actinomycetes
- Order: Actinomycetales
- Family: Actinomycetaceae
- Genus: Actinomyces
- Species: A. massiliensis

Binomial name
- Actinomyces massiliensis Renvoise et al. 2009

Type strain
- 4401292 CSUR P18; CCUG 53522

Species of bacterium

Actinomyces massiliensis is an anaerobic, mesophilic, Gram-positive bacterium originally isolated from a human blood sample and belonging to the genus Actinomyces.

== Etymology ==
The genus name, Actinomyces, borrows from the Greek words "aktinos" and "mykēs" which refer to ray and fungus, respectively. When combined, Actinomyces translates to "ray fungus", reflecting the radial arrangement of filaments in addition to the presence of asexual spores, both of which are characteristic of filamentous fungus. This corresponds to the misconception that upon discovery they were fungi due to their long cells branching into structures resembling filaments and hyphae. Marseille, the town in France where the original type strain was found, is inspiration for the species name, massiliensis, with old Greek and Roman language origins.

== Discovery and isolation ==
In December 2003, a middle-aged man was hospitalized due to the coughing up of blood accompanied by flu-like symptoms and weight loss. Upon examination, the patient was found to have lesions on his lungs, which were surgically removed. Four months later, he was readmitted with malaise, dyspnea, and thoracic pain. The attending physicians diagnosed him with pleuropneumonia and treated it with two types of antibiotics. The patient responded well and was discharged, however, blood samples were continually taken to monitor the progress of his recovery. Using the patient blood sample, Renvoise et al. performed blood cultures and the bacterium strain 4401292T was isolated. Subsequent 16S rRNA gene sequencing analysis demonstrated that a novel strain of the genus Actinomyces had been identified.

The DNA of the bacterial specimen was extracted using an isolation kit, which separates total nucleic acid from plasma/blood, followed by amplification of the 16s rRNA gene through polymerase chain reaction (PCR) with universal primer pair fD1 and rp2. After purification, a DNA sequencing kit was used to execute sequencing reactions and the subsequent sequencing products were then compared to existing sequences in GenBank using the Basic Local Alignment Search Tool (BLAST). Utilizing the maximum-parsimony method, the novel strain exhibited clustering with A. gerencseriae, A. israelii, A. oricola, and two other Actinomyces species, supported by bootstrap analysis. The accompanying similarities between 16s rRNA gene sequences of these species to that of strain 4401292T, as measured by NALIGN computational software, yielded 95.1%, 95.2%, and 95.2%, respectively. All values were found to be below the accepted threshold of 97%, confirming that the strain isolated from the patient blood sample represented a novel species proposed as Actinomyces massiliensis sp. Nov..

== Taxonomy and related species ==
This bacterium is a member of the genus Actinomyces and its taxonomic classification is as follows: Bacteria, Actinomycetota, Actinomycetes, Actinomycetales, Actinomycetaceae, Actinomyces, Actinomyces massiliensis. To date, there are over 30 species of Actinomyces documented in the literature.

The closest relative to A. massiliensis is still currently debated. Those who first isolated the strain found A. gerencseriae, A. israelii, A. oricola to be most similar in terms of 16s rRNA gene sequence similarity, as mentioned above. However, the results of Cimmino et al.'s molecular phylogenetic analysis reveal that A. oricola and A. dentalis are more closely related. The differences in the phylogenetic construction of A. massiliensis and related species reflect the need for whole genome sequencing to better understand and delineate the evolutionary history of closely related species of A. massiliensis. Although further investigation is necessary, A. oricola, A. dentalis, A. israelii, and A. gerencseriae have all been isolated from human sources, including mucosal surfaces and the oral cavity. Additionally, these species have several traits in common with A. massiliensis including their role as agents of actinomycosis and shared phenotypic characteristics described below.

== Morphology ==
Actinomyces massiliensis is a non-spore forming, non-motile, Gram-positive, rod-shaped bacterium. Cells measure at 0.5-1.7 μm in length and 0.35-0.74 μm in width, and they appear as straight rods. When plated on sheep-blood agar, colonies of A. massiliensis are circular, white, and have a glossy sheen.

== Metabolism and physiology ==
To determine metabolic and physiological properties, A. massiliensis colonies were grown on 5% sheep-blood agar and incubated at 37 °C. No hemolytic activity was found, but growth was further evaluated at various atmospheric conditions, including ambient air, 5% CO_{2}, aerobic, and microaerophilic environments. The strain proved to be anaerobic and possessed the ability to grow in 5% CO_{2} and microaerophilic conditions. In addition to atmospheric conditions, the strain's ability to grow at various temperatures was evaluated, specifically at 25, 30, 37, 44, and 50 °C. While optimum growth occurred at 37 °C, growth continued at temperatures between 30 °C and 37 °C. The mesophilic nature of the organism implies that it is adapted to growing at the human body temperature, and microbes that grow optimally at 37 °C are often associated with environments similar to the human body, such as the skin, mucous membranes, respiratory tract, gastrointestinal tract, and genitourinary tract. Additionally, cells were susceptible to an array of antibiotics including penicillin G, amoxicillin, cefotetan, doxycycline, and gentamicin, so although the organism can inhabit and thrive in human-like conditions, it remains treatable with commonly employed antibiotics. The organism is capable of utilizing various amino acids and carbohydrates for carbon and energy sources demonstrated by activity from multiple arylamidases, which catalyze the hydrolysis of amide bonds in aromatic compounds. Additionally, activity by b-galactosidase, which catalyzes the hydrolysis of β-galactosides, such as lactose into monosaccharides, and a-glucosidase, which catalyzes the hydrolysis of α-glucosides, such as maltose into glucose, was observed while other enzymatic assays were negative. Both catalase and oxidase activity were also negative using conventional tests, emphasizing the anaerobic nature of A. massiliensis. Catalase is used to catalyze the decomposition of hydrogen peroxide into oxygen and water, and oxidase catalyzes the oxidation of certain substrates, such as cytochrome C, in the presence of oxygen. Anaerobic organisms normally lack such enzymes as both incorporate oxygen, which could be detrimental to their survival. Subsequently, fermentation capabilities are suggested through acid production observed from D-galactose, D-glucose, D-fructose, maltose, lactose, and sucrose. The ability to ferment a wide range of sugars reflects adaptation of the microorganism to diverse environmental niches with fluctuating nutrient availability. Tests that used an analytical profile index for measurement of bacterial metabolism were positive for b-galactosidase, a-glucosidase, reduction of nitrates, proline arylamidase, phenylalanine arylamidase, and leucine arylamidase, but mannose fermentation and tyrosine arylamidase activity produced only minimally positive results.

== Genotypic characterization ==
Using shotgun sequencing and 3-kb paired-end (PE) sequencing, the draft genome for A. massiliensis, which is about 3.4 Mb, was found to contain 5 scaffolds and 27 contigs greater than 1500 base pairs. G+C nucleotide content comprises 67% of the genome which also contains 54 tRNA genes, 1 tmRNA gene, and genes that encode for about 2,894 putative proteins. Additionally, CRISPR loci were located and assumed to aid in resistance to plasmids and phages. After sequencing and comparative measures were finalized, a reciprocal BLAST analysis of A. massiliensis showed over 1000+ orthologs with A. urogenitalis and A. viscosus. However, despite advances in the whole genome sequencing of A. massiliensis, there has not been greater success in phylogenetic placement of the species in relation to other similar species. Because bacteria have mechanisms like horizontal gene transfer, it is possible for two strains that are not each other's closest relative to have a high degree of genetic similarity. This underscores the complexity of microbial evolution and provides an explanation for why the exact relatives of A. massiliensis remains elusive.

== Ecology ==
Species belonging to Actinomyces are abundant in diverse environments, ranging from soil and aquatic habitats to the human microbiome. In soil environments, Actinomycetes act as decomposers breaking down organic compounds. This ability contributes to soil fertility, plant health, and nutrient cycling. Additionally, Actinomyces have been identified as important members of the human microbiome, residing in various sites such as the oral cavity (mouth, pharynx, esophagus) and gastrointestinal tract. While some Actinomyces species are commensal, others can cause opportunistic infections in humans, commonly Actinomycosis. Unfortunately, the ecological significance of A. massiliensis specifically is not yet known.

== Applications ==
Due to its relatively recent discovery, there is limited research on the specific impacts of A. massiliensis. Nonetheless, studies on Actinomyces in general, which may encompass A. massiliensis, offer valuable insights into potential areas of impact, particularly in clinical settings. Actinomyces and its associated species have, for a long time, been implicated in human infections, particularly those of the mouth, pharynx, distal esophagus, and genitourinary tract. Within the last 10 years, A. massiliensis has been detected in blood, and most Actinomyces bacteremias stem from oral sources. Moreover, bacteremia has been repeatedly observed in the aftermath of invasive dental procedures and in individuals experiencing gingivitis and periodontitis. When gums are inflamed and/or bleeding after surgery or in the cases of gingivitis and periodontitis, they provide an easy entry point for actinobacteria into the bloodstream. Evidence of this phenomenon is presented in blood samples of patients who have undergone tooth extractions without antibiotic prophylaxis. The increasing prevalence of Actinomyces species in infectious pathologies solidifies their clinical relevance and the need for further study on specific species' involvement.

In 2024, the characterization of the oral-brain axis hypothesis has garnered attention, with one study suggesting that oral-specific bacteria, including associated metabolites, may contribute to the development of Alzheimer's Disease (AD). Focus was primarily isolated to periodontitis and subsequent "chronic subgingival microbial dysbiosis" as a potential contributor to AD development. That is, microbiota associated with periodontal disease may affect cognitive abilities by activating microglia and/or releasing metabolites. Additionally, being close to the cerebrum could encourage easier access by the oral microbiota in influencing brain diseases. Analysis of gingival crevicular fluid revealed 19 different metabolites that were significantly correlated with 5 abundant species present in subgingival plaque samples, one of them being A. massiliensis. These metabolite and species associations were further correlated with neurological/periodontal indices that served as a possible separator between AD patients and cognitively normal patients. Thus, recent evidence supporting the oral-brain axis indicates potential consequences regarding the subgingival microbial community in which A. massiliensis is an inhabitant. However, a lot is still unknown, and what is known is largely about correlation, not causation.
