= James Israel =

Jewish-German surgeon (1848–1926)

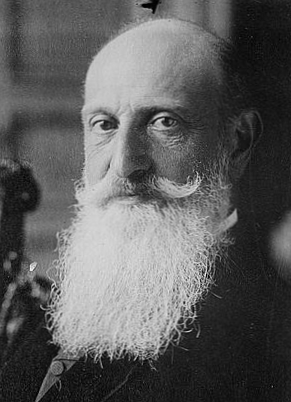
- James Israel
- Born: 2 February 1848
- Died: 2 February 1926 (aged 78)
- Education: Friedrich-Wilhelms-Universität
- Known for: urologic and renal surgery Actinomyces
- Scientific career
- Fields: surgery
- Doctoral advisor: Ludwig Traube (physician)

James Adolf Israel (2 February 1848 – 2 February 1926) was a German surgeon.

== Academic background ==
Israel was a native of Berlin, where he was born to Jewish parents. In 1870, Israel received his medical doctorate from Friedrich-Wilhelms-Universität in Berlin, where he studied under Ludwig Traube (1818–1876). During the Franco-Prussian War, he served as a military physician, afterwards furthering his studies in Vienna (1871).

During the following year (1872), he became an assistant physician at the hospital for the Jewish community. In 1875, after furthering his education in England and Scotland, he was appointed deputy physician-in-chief of the surgical department of the Jewish hospital in Berlin, where, in 1880, he was promoted to chief-in-chief.

In 1894, he received the title of professor. Among his students in Berlin was surgeon Ferdinand Karewski (1858-1923).

== Contributions in medicine ==
Israel was a pioneer in modern urologic and renal surgery. His inaugural thesis involved Bright's kidney disease, and his first report of an operation of the kidney was in 1882. He published over 100 articles during his career, largely on urologic medicine. He was co-founder of the journal Folia Urologica.

Israel made significant contributions in the field of plastic surgery, in particular, oral and maxillofacial surgery. He was also an early advocate of Joseph Lister's antiseptic practices in the operating room. In addition, he is credited for design of a mobile hospital railcar known as a "lazarett".

In 1878, he provided the first description of actinomycosis in humans, caused by a pathogen that was later given the name Actinomyces israelii.

== Associated eponym ==
The Nicoladoni-Israel-Branham sign is a circulatory phenomenon seen in angioma racemosum of the extremities. It was first described in 1875 by Carl Nicoladoni (1847–1902).

== Selected writings ==
- Fünf Fälle von diffuser Nephritis (Five cases of diffuse nephritis). Medical dissertation, Berlin 1870.
- Angiectasie im Stromgebiete der A. tibialis antica.
- Beobachtung einiger bemerkenswerther Phaenomene nach Unterbindung der A. femoralis . (Observations of a remarkable phenomena after removal of the femoral artery). Klin Arch Chir 1877; 21 109.
- Klinische Beiträge zur Kenntnis der Aktinomykose des Menschen. (Clinical contributions to the knowledge of actinomycosis in humans). Berlin 1885.
- Ueber Reincultur des Actinomyces und seine Uebertragbarkeit auf Thiere. Archiv Pathologische Anatomie; (1891); 126:11–28, (with Max Wolff).
- Chirurgische Klinik der Nierenkrankheiten. (Surgical clinic of renal disease). Berlin 1901.
- Die Chirurgie der Niere und des Harnleiters. (The surgery of the kidney and ureter). 1926.
