= Actinomycosis in animals =

Bacterial disease mostly affecting cattle

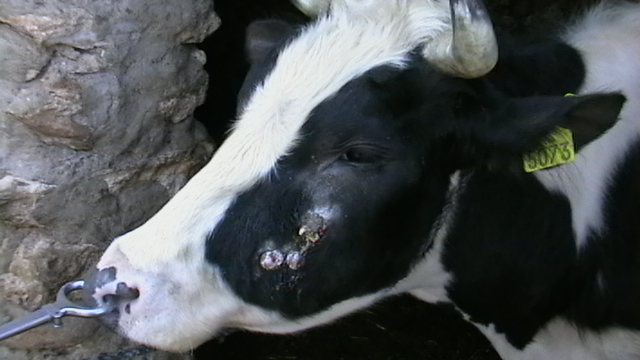
bovine actinomycosis, 3-year-old bull, 2-month evolution

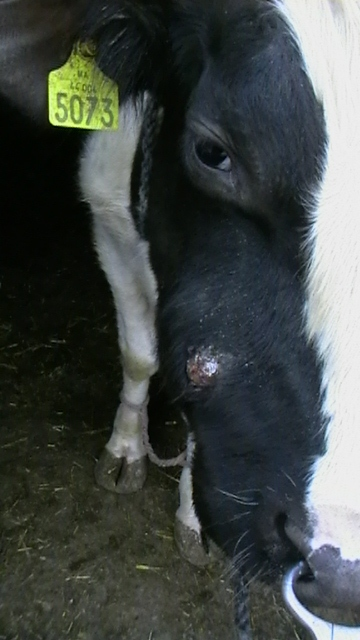
bony swelling of the right maxillae

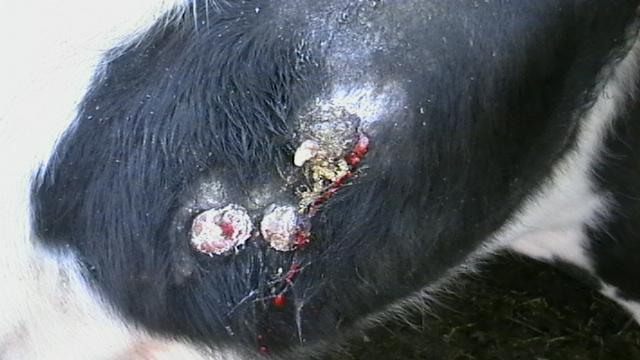
thick matter (top) and old fistulous granulomas

Actinomycosis is an infection caused by a bacterium of the genus Actinomyces, usually Actinomyces bovis; the disease it causes has several common names. When it is a moveable tumour or lump on the jaw area, it is referred to as lump jaw; when it spreads into the hard bone of the jaw, it is referred to as big jaw; and when it affects the tongue, it is referred to as wooden tongue.

== Actinomycosis in cattle ==
Actinomycosis is a common condition in weaned calves, young bulls, and heifers. The disease has a chronic course, and the general body condition can remain quite good. Swelling in the area of the maxilla and mandible occurs. Fistulization occurs after some days, leaving a thick, yellowish, nonodorous pus, with mineralised, 2-to-5 mm (0.079-to-0.197 in) grains therein. Later, a granuloma forms in the place of fistulization. The bony lesions (osteomyelitis, periostitis) cause permanent deformation.

Actinomyces can rarely cause lesions in the intestinal tract, lungs, and liver. The diagnosis of the actinomycotic lesions in internal organs is usually diagnosed post mortem.

== Cause and route of infections ==
Actinomycosis can be contracted via simple injuries and wounds. The bacteria are common soil and commensal organisms in humans and animals.

== Control ==
To control the spread of the disease, affected animals should be isolated or sent for slaughter. The herd should be rotated to a new grazing area to reduce the chances of further infection.

== Treatment ==
The affected areas can be treated with iodine solutions. A common method to achieve this is to give the cattle sodium iodide orally on a regular treatment schedule. Antibiotics such as tetracyclines are also used, alone or with iodine; simultaneous use is considered more aggressive. Killing the bacteria that cause the infection is the ultimate purpose of these treatment methods. However, treatment may not be effective unless it is started early. Notably, surgery is not typically considered for treatment of production cattle.

== Prevention ==
Prevention of infection is not possible, as Actinomyces is a widespread and common soil organism; complete elimination from soil is not possible.

== Differential diagnosis ==
Differential diagnoses include abscesses caused by grass seeds, woody tongue, bottle jaw, cancerous growths, and irritation caused by lodged objects.

== Other species affected ==
Although actinomycosis is more common in cattle, it can also be found in horses, sheep, swine, dogs, deer, and humans. In humans, the infection is usually caused by A. israelii.
