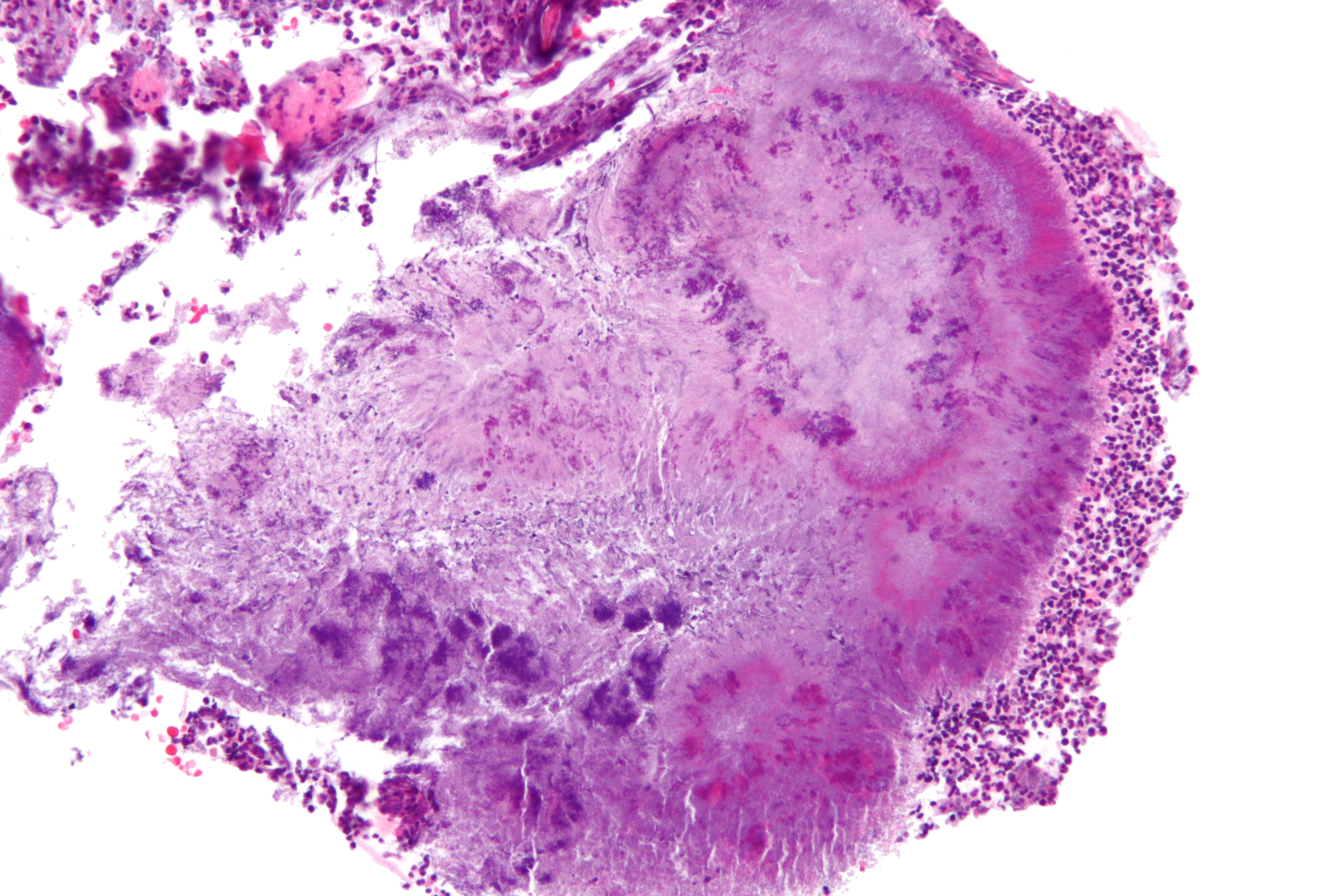
- High-magnification micrograph of a "sulfur" granule formed by Actinomyces in the mandible, H&E stain

Scientific classification
- Domain: Bacteria
- Kingdom: Bacillati
- Phylum: Actinomycetota
- Class: Actinomycetes
- Order: Actinomycetales
- Family: Actinomycetaceae
- Genus: Actinomyces
- Species: A. bovis

Binomial name
- Actinomyces bovis Harz 1877 (Approved Lists 1980)

Type strain
- ATCC 13683; CCUG 31996; CIP 103258; DSM 43014; NCTC 11535

= Actinomyces bovis =

Species of bacterium

Actinomyces bovis is a branching, Gram-positive, rod-shaped bacterium of the genus Actinomyces. It is the causative agent of lumpy jaw in cattle, and occasionally causes actinomycosis infections in humans. A. bovis normally populates the gastrointestinal tract of healthy ruminants, but is opportunistic in nature and will move into tissues through ulcerations or abrasions of the mucosa to cause infection. The disease occurs when there is physical damage to the tissue of the mouth, allowing the bacteria to colonize the deep tissue and bone, typically affecting the mandible and maxilla. Actinomycosis is pathognomonic for abscesses containing "sulfur" granules, and its colonies appear basophilic with club-shaped reaction products on a histological preparation. Lumpy jaw is commonly treated with broad-spectrum antibiotics with varying success, and can be a major economic loss for producers in countries where it is endemic. Because this organism is zoonotic, it is a human health concern and can cause granulomas, abscesses, skin lesions, and bronchopneumonia.

== History ==
A. bovis was first described in 1877 by Bollinger and Harz, when they isolated the causative agent of lumpy jaw from a cow. Two theories for the source of infection have since been developed. The first is called the exogenous theory and was developed by Bostroem in 1891, when he suggested infection is caused by a foreign body, such as hard hay or grass awns. This theory has mostly been supported by clinical observations, and has been hard to demonstrate in a laboratory setting. The second is called the endogenous theory, which suggests that A. bovis is naturally found in the mouths of healthy animals. This theory has been supported by several researchers over the years as they have been able to isolate multiple strains of Actinomyces. In 1905, Wright described isolation techniques and colony morphology in different media. A. bovis has been isolated from tonsillar crypts, infected teeth, and dental scum of normal mouths from human and animal patients. Several researchers were then able to conclude that the bacteria are part of the normal flora of the mouth, making the mouth a source of disease. The number and virulence of bacterial particles involved in the infection have been suggested to contribute to whether or not disease occurs. Several researchers have tried to establish the infection in live animals with isolated bacterial cultures, but the results have been mixed, with some seeing development of disease and some seeing no change. In 1950, the lifecycle of A. bovis was described.

== Morphology ==
A. bovis is a branching, rod-shaped bacterium. In its diploid phase, it is Gram-positive; during the haploid phase, it is club-shaped and is Gram-negative. A. bovis is catalase-negative, which can differentiate it from other anaerobic diphtheroids. A. bovis microcolonies on brain heart infusion agar can be distinguished from the closely related organisms Actinomyces israelii and Actinomyces naeslundii. The ability for A. bovis to hydrolyze starch is another way to distinguish it from A. israelli and A. naeslundii.

== Lifecycle ==
A. bovis goes through a two-phase cell cycle, a haploid phase and a diploid phase. The lifecycle begins with the haploid phase with the germination of a spore. The spore buds out into club shapes and branches as it undergoes nuclear replication in preparation for conjugation. Two specialized haploid cells then conjugate to become the initial cell of the diploid phase. This initial cell germinates and branches as it undergoes nuclear replication. A spore is then formed from a diploid phase branch, and the spore undergoes nuclear reduction, after which the spore buds off and completes the lifecycle.

== Role in disease ==
=== Clinical presentation and diagnosis ===
Lumpy jaw (actinomycosis) in cattle can present itself in two main ways. One is as soft-tissue abscesses in the mouth and on the tongue. The other explains its common name, lumpy jaw, as A. bovis bacteria infect the mandibular bone, causing osteomyelitis and the formation of periosteal new bone, giving it the classical lumpy jaw appearance. It is caused by sharp objects, such as coarse feed materials or sticks, causing penetrative lesions in the mouth when ingested or by complication of periodontitis. Deeper lesions are required to cause infections in the bone, while shallower lesions are more likely to cause mouth abscesses. The bony lumps are usually not painful and can develop over weeks to months, causing facial distortion, dyspnea, and occasionally loose teeth. The abscesses within the bony lumps or soft tissue commonly consist of purulent granulation tissue, often gritty in texture, surrounded by a fibrous capsule.

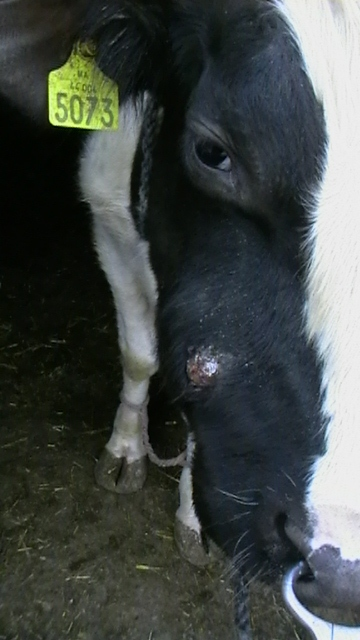
Actinomycosis affecting the maxilla in a cow

To diagnose lumpy jaw, the fluids exuding from the bony lump or other abscesses are sampled or aspirated if the infection has not broken through the skin. Tissue samples from the lesion can be examined by histopathology after being embedded in paraffin wax, cut into 4- to 5-mm sections, and stained with hemolysin and eosin stains. The clubs could also be stained by carbol fuchsin with decolourisation by weak hydrochloric acid and counter-staining with methylene blue, Van Gieson's stain, or aniline gentian violet followed by treatment with alcohol. A. bovis can be identified histologically by its basophilic colonies and club-shaped reaction product visible in neutrophilic granulomatous lesions. The club-shapes, also called Spendore-Hoeppli proteins, seen on histological slides are the result of the bacteria being encased in a calcium-phosphate protein complex, as the host attempts to wall off the infection. Another diagnostic feature is the presence of "sulfur" granules, which is pathognomonic for actinomycosis. These granules are small, yellow clumps of exudate that are visible to the naked eye with a similar appearance to grains of sulfur, and are mainly composed of bacterial filaments and host calcium phosphate.

=== Treatment ===
The efficacy of the clinical treatment for A. bovis lesions is not always successful, but conventional treatment plans involving combinations of broad-spectrum antibiotics and concurrent administration of iodide solutions have demonstrated success in reducing the inflammation and spread of the lesion. Initial treatment involves surgical debridement of purulent and soft-tissue lesions followed by daily cleaning and flushing of the infection site with saline and povidone-iodine solution, respectively, for about 1 week. Treatment success has been noted individually for both potassium iodide oral solution, and for intravenous sodium iodide, as well as when used conjunctively. However, frequent treatment with iodide may lead to toxicity, and monitoring for clinical signs of iodine toxicity should be included throughout the course of treatment. Consequently, administration of iodide should be either reduced or discontinued if such signs of toxicity are observed. Antibiotic combinations of intramuscular penicillin and streptomycin are commonly used for 5–7 days, and have been widely associated with treatment success. Additional antibiotics such as oxytetracycline, florfenicol, and cloxacillin have also demonstrated sensitivity.

=== Prevention ===
Infiltration of A. bovis occurs following trauma and subsequent infection of the oral cavity. Common causes of trauma to the oral mucosa include consumption of abrasive feed or foreign bodies (thorns, wire, etc.), or eruptions of cheek teeth. Prevention advice focuses on avoiding coarse feed with suggestions such as softening feed with water. Examination of feed structure is especially encouraged if the infection is widespread throughout the herd.

== Economics ==
A. bovis is one of the few Actinomyces species considered to have some economic impact, though this impact is considered minimal because it is not typically transmitted between animals within a herd and affected animals are often culled. In Ethiopia, actinomycosis accounted for 1.34% of condemnations.
