= Max Wolff (physician) =

German physician (1844–1923)

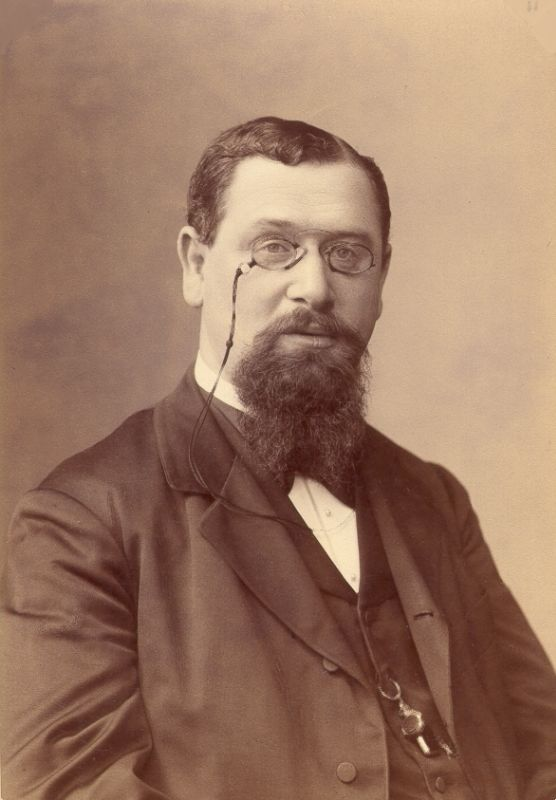
Max Wolff (1844-1923)

Max Wolff (6 May 1844 – 25 June 1923) was a German physician who was a native of Potsdam.

He studied medicine in Berlin, where he was a student of Rudolf Virchow. Following graduation in 1866, he became an assistant at the clinic of internal medicine at Rostock. From 1875 to 1882 he worked at the University of Berlin policlinic, and in 1900 became head of the policlinic for lung diseases. In 1890 he earned the title of associate professor in Berlin.

Wolff is remembered for his work with surgeon James Adolf Israel (1848–1926) involving the isolation of Actinomyces and research involving the etiology of actinomycosis.

== Selected publications ==
- Über Addison'sche Krankheit (About Addison's disease), 1869.
- Operative Behandlung von Unterleibsechinococcen (Operative treatment of abdomen echinococcus), 1870.
- Über entzündliche Veränderungen innerer Organe nach experimentell bei Thieren erzeugten käsigen Herden (On inflammatory changes of inner organs following the experimental induction of caseating granulomas in animals), Virchow's Archiv LXVII.
- Zur Bacterienfrage bei accidentellen Wundkrankheiten (On the spread of bacteria in accidental wounds), Virchow's Archiv LXXXI.
- Eine weitverbreitete thierische Mykose (A widespread animal mycosis), Virchow's Archiv LXXXII.
- Über Desinfection durch Temperaturerhöhung (About disinfection during temperature increase), Virchow's Archiv CII.
- Die Localisation des Giftes in den Miesmuscheln (Localization of poison in mussels), Virchow's Archiv CIII.
- Die Ausdehnung des Gebietes der giftigen Miesmuscheln und der sonstigen giftigen Seethiere in Wilhelmshaven (Extension of the territory of toxic mussels and other toxic sea creatures in Wilhelmshaven), Virchow's Archiv CIV.
- Über das erneute Vorkommen von giftigen Miesmuscheln in Wilhelmshaven (On the re-occurrence of toxic mussels in Wilhelmshaven), Virchow's Archiv CX.
- Über Vererbung von Infectionskrankheiten (Inheritance of infectious diseases), Virchow's Archiv CXII.
- Über Vaccination neugeborener Kinder (Vaccination of newborn children), Virchow's Archiv CXVII.
- Über Reincultur des Actinomyces und seine Übertragbarkeit auf Thiere (About pure culture of actinomyces and its transferability to animals), Virchow's Archiv CXXVI.
- Zur Actinomyces-Frage (On the question of actinomyces), Virchow's Archiv CLI.
- Zur Prophylaxe der venerischen Krankheiten (Regarding prophylaxis of venereal disease), 1893.
- Die Nierenresection und ihre Folgen (Of kidney resection and its consequences), 1900.
