= Cutaneous actinomycosis =

- Specialty: Dermatology

Cutaneous actinomycosis is a chronic disease that affects the deep subcutaneous tissue of the skin. Caused by an anaerobic, Gram-positive, filamentous type of bacteria in the genus Actinomyces, invasion of the soft tissue leads to the formation of abnormal channels leading to the skin surface (external sinus tracts) that discharge pale yellow sulfur granules.

This disease is uncommon, and has non-specific clinical features, making it difficult to diagnose.

Cervicofacial, pulmonary/thoracic and gastrointestinal forms exist, yet cervicofacial disease accounts for two-thirds of reported infections.

== See also ==
- Skin lesion
