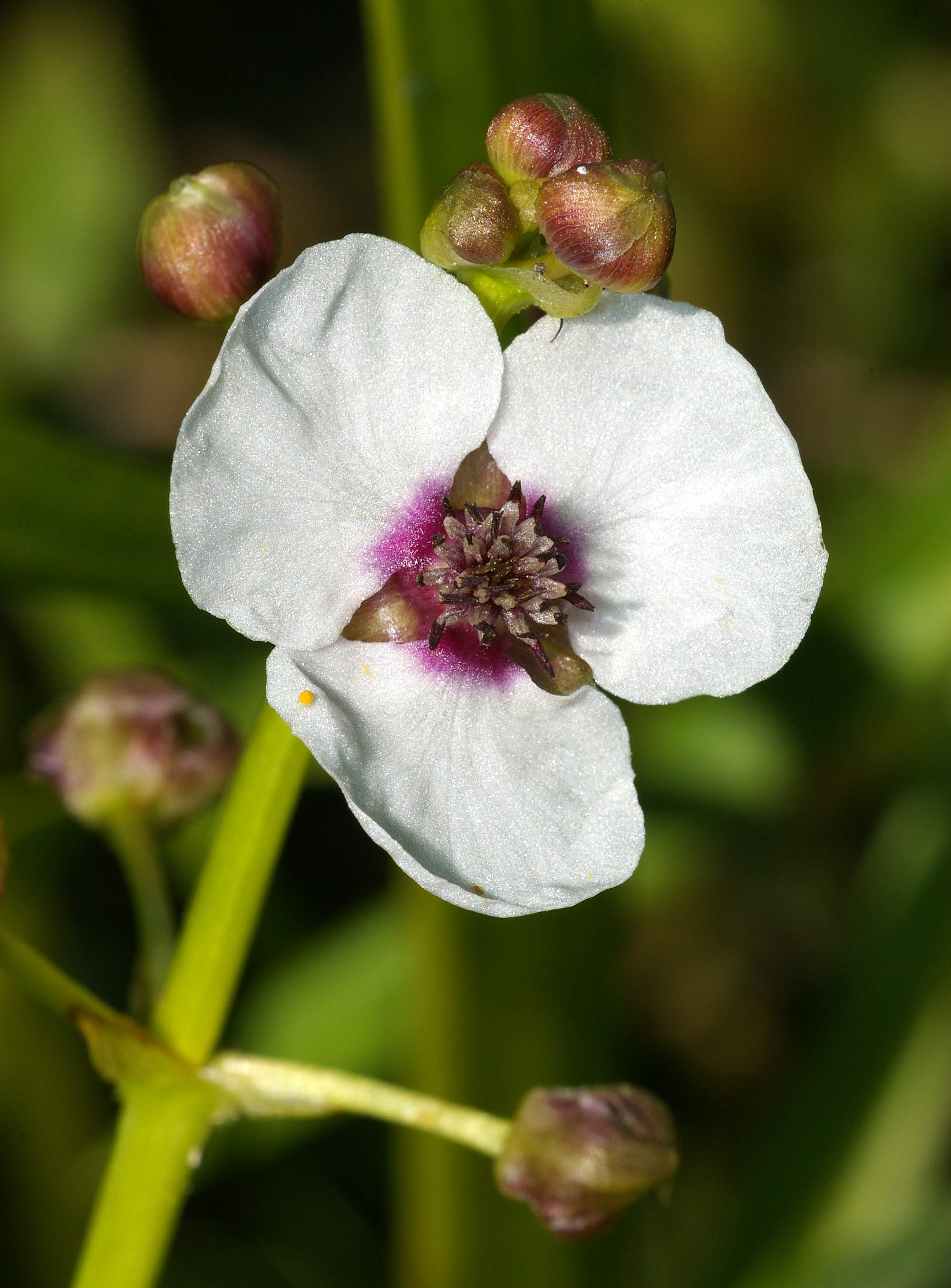

Conservation status
- Least Concern (IUCN 3.1)

Scientific classification
- Kingdom: Plantae
- Clade: Tracheophytes
- Clade: Angiosperms
- Clade: Monocots
- Order: Alismatales
- Family: Alismataceae
- Genus: Sagittaria
- Species: S. sagittifolia

Binomial name
- Sagittaria sagittifolia L.

Synonyms
- Synonyms: Sagitta major Scop.; Sagitta aquatica (Lam.) St.-Lag.; Sagitta palustris Bubani; Sagittaria acuminata Sm.; Sagittaria aquatica Lam.; Sagittaria aquatica var. minor Gray; Sagittaria bulbosa (Poir.) Donn; Sagittaria gigantea E.Vilm.; Sagittaria heterophylla Schreb.; Sagittaria lancifolia E.VilmV.; Sagittaria minor Mill.; Sagittaria monoeca Gilib.; Sagittaria sagittifolia var. aequiloba Schur; Sagittaria sagittifolia var. angustata Tinant; Sagittaria sagittifolia var. angustifolia Gaudin; Sagittaria sagittifolia var. angustissima Boreau; Sagittaria sagittifolia var. arifolia Rouy; Sagittaria sagittifolia var. bollei Asch. & Graebn.; Sagittaria sagittifolia subvar. butomoides Asch. & Graebn.; Sagittaria sagittifolia var. divaricata Schur; Sagittaria sagittifolia var. heterophylla (Schreb.) Schur; Sagittaria sagittifolia var. minor (Mill.) Regel; Sagittaria sagittifolia var. obtusa Bolle; Sagittaria sagittifolia subvar. pumila Asch. & Graebn.; Sagittaria sagittifolia var. stratiotes Bolle in Verh.; Sagittaria sagittifolia var. terrestris Bolle in Verh.; Sagittaria sagittifolia var. vallisneriifolia Coss. & Germ.; Sagittaria sagittifolia f. vallisneriifolia (Coss. & Germ.) Neuman; Sagittaria sagittifolia f. xanthandraHolmb.; Sagittaria tenuior Gand.; Sagittaria vulgaris Gueld; Alisma sagittaria Stokes; Vallisneria bulbosa Poir.

= Sagittaria sagittifolia =

Arrowhead

Species of flowering plant

Sagittaria sagittifolia (also called arrowhead because of the shape of its leaves) is an Old World flowering plant in the family Alismataceae.

== Description ==
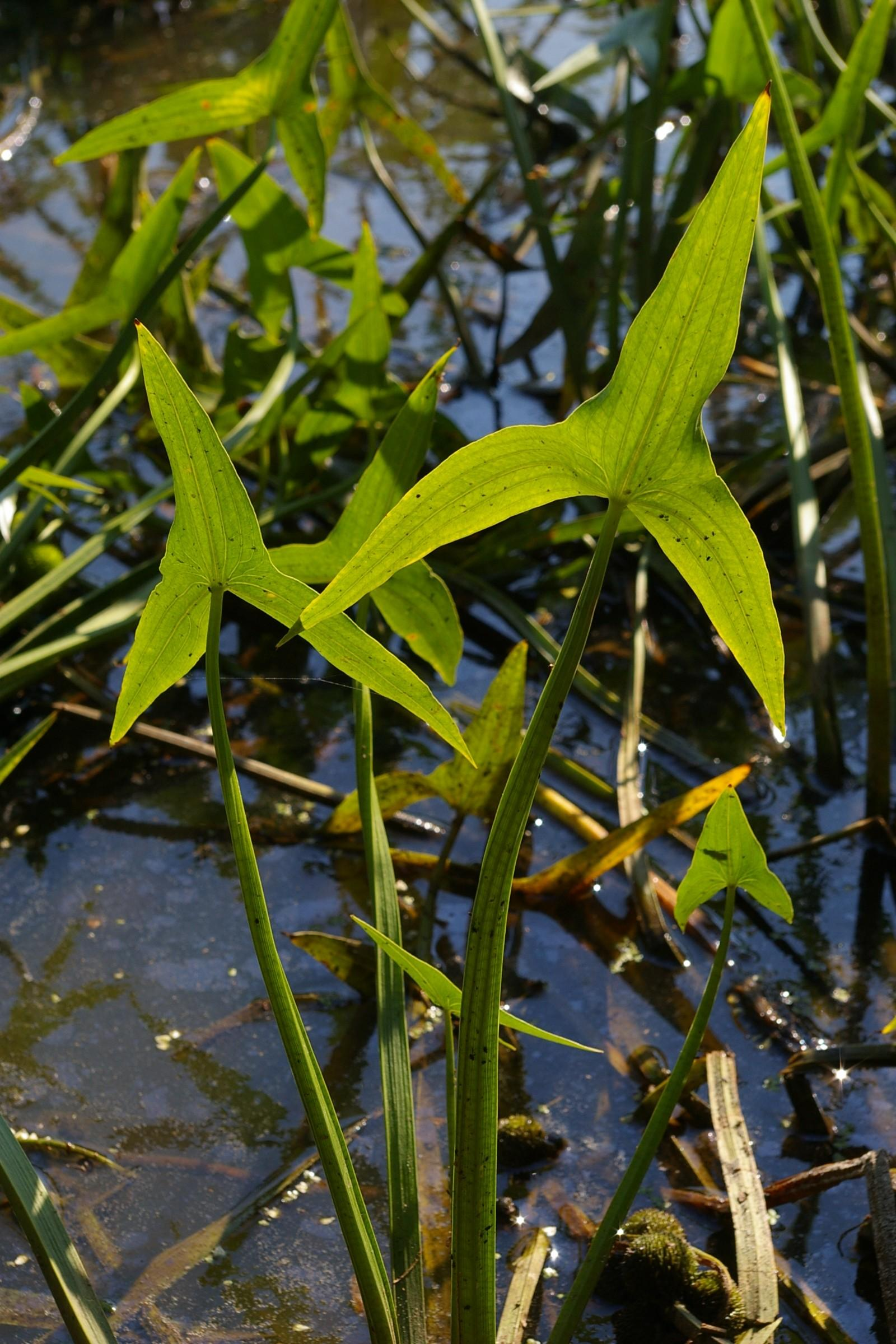
Leaves

Sagittaria sagittifolia is a herbaceous perennial plant, growing in water from 10–50 centimetres (4–19 1/2 inches) deep. The leaves above water are arrowhead-shaped, the leaf blade 15–25 cm (6–10 in) long and 10–22 cm (4–8 1/2 in) broad, on a long petiole holding the leaf up to 45 cm (17 1/2 in) above water level. The plant also has narrow linear submerged leaves, up to 80 cm (31 1/2 in) long and 2 cm broad. Panicled flowers are 2–2.5 cm broad, with three small sepals and three white petals, and numerous purple stamens.

== Distribution and habitat ==
It is native to wetlands in most of Europe (it is extinct in Spain) and Asia in Finland and Bulgaria, in Russia, Ukraine, Siberia, Turkey and the Caucasus. It is also cultivated as a food crop in some other countries. In Britain it is the only native species of Sagittaria.

== Ecology ==
S. sagittifolia can be weedy or invasive according to the USDA, Animal and Plant Health Inspection Service, Plant Protection and Quarantine. It also appears on state noxious weed lists for 46 states.

== Uses ==
The round tuber is edible. It is starchy with a bland flavour and a texture similar to a potato but somewhat crunchier, even when cooked. In Japan, it is known as kuwai クワイ (慈姑) and its tuber is eaten particularly during the New Year. In China, it is known as 慈姑 cígū and often used in winter hot pots. In Vietnam, the plant's young petiole leaves and rhizomes are used for soups.

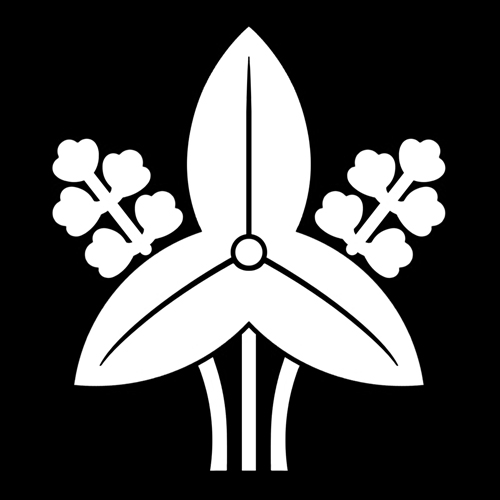
Omodaka kamon (ja:沢瀉紋) depicting stylized arrowhead

Remnants of Sagittaria sagittifolia have been found in the Paleolithic/Mesolithic site of Całowanie in Poland.

S. sagittifolia is used in Chinese medicine, and in 2006 seven new ent-rosane diterpenoids and a new labdane diterpene were purified from the plant. Four of these compounds (Sagittine A–D) exhibited antibacterial activity against Streptococcus mutans and Actinomyces naeslundii while another (Sagittine E) was only active against A. naeslundii (MIC = 62.5 μg ml–1). Recently, the same group identified five new diterpenoids from Sagittaria pygmaea. None displayed activity against A. actinomycetemcomitans, while four of the others were active against A. viscosus and three against S. mutans, of which 18-ß-D-3',6'-diacetoxyglucopyranosyl-ent-kaur-16-ene was the most active.
