= Actinomyces viscosus =

Scientific classification
- Domain: Bacteria
- Kingdom: Bacillati
- Phylum: Actinomycetota
- Class: Actinomycetes
- Order: Actinomycetales
- Family: Actinomycetaceae
- Genus: Actinomyces
- Species: A. viscosus

Binomial name
- Actinomyces viscosus (Howell et al. 1965) Georg et al. 1969 (Approved Lists 1980)

Synonyms
- "Odontomyces viscosus" Howell et al. 1965

Species of bacterium

Actinomyces viscosus is a human and animal pathogen/pathobiont which colonises the mouths of 70% of adult humans. A. viscosus has a low level of virulence and is often mistaken with other actinomycetes.

== Morphology ==
A. viscosus is Gram-positive, facultatively anaerobic, rod-shaped, and filamentous. It grows slowly on nonselective media, forming gray and white colonies.

== Pathogenesis ==
A. viscosus causes periodontal disease in animals and has been isolated from human dental calculus and root surface caries, as well as the oral cavity of hamsters and actinomycotic lesions in swine, cats, and dogs. Furthermore, it has been shown to cause endocarditis in humans. A. viscosus has also been known to cause lung infections, but only in very few cases. Infections are treatable with penicillin for three-week therapies.

== Diagnosis ==
A. viscosus infection symptoms are indistinguishable from Actinomyces israelii infection symptoms or Actinomyces bovis infection symptoms. A. israelii and A. bovis infections usually cause actinomycotic infections, but sometimes and very rarely will the pathogen be A. viscosus. A. viscosus colonies test positive for catalase and negative for indole.

== Treatment ==
Multiple-week antibiotic therapies have cured actinomycotic infections caused by A. viscosus in every recorded case. Therapies include treatment with penicillin, sulfadimethoxine, flucloxacillin, clindamycin, tetracycline, and ticarcillin. A. viscosus is usually resistant to vancomycin, metronidazole, cefalexin, and dicloxacillin. Treatments last at least three weeks, with some exceptions. Although A. viscosus is difficult to distinguish from other closely related actinomycetes, the general determination of being an actinomycete is sufficient for treatment of infections.
