= Max Wolff =

Max Wolff may refer to:

- Max Wolff (soldier) (1912–1945), Brazilian Army sergeant in World War II
- Max Wolff (composer) (1840–1886), Austrian composer
- Max Wolff (physician) (1844–1923), German physician
