= David Hendricks Bergey =

American bacteriologist (1860–1937)

- Born: December 27, 1860; Skippack, Pennsylvania
- Died: September 5, 1937 (aged 76); Philadelphia, Pennsylvania
- Education: University of Pennsylvania
- Scientific career
- Fields: Bacteriology
- Workplaces: University of Pennsylvania

David Hendricks Bergey (1860-1937) was an American bacteriologist.

He studied at University of Pennsylvania, where he obtained his Bachelor of Science and Doctor of Medicine degrees in 1884. He practiced medicine in North Wales, Pennsylvania, until 1893. He then joined the university's hygiene laboratory, where he taught hygiene and bacteriology. He led the laboratory from 1929 until his retirement in 1932. During WWI he was on academic leave of absence from 1917 to 1919, when he served in the United States Army Medical Reserve Corps as chief of the laboratory staff at Fort Oglethorpe.

His Principles of Hygiene was first published in 1901 and went through seven editions. He was chairman of the Editorial Board for the first edition of Bergey's Manual of Determinative Bacteriology, published in 1923. The Determinative Manual has subsequently been published in a further eight editions, and Bergey's Manual Trust is currently publishing the second edition of Bergey's Manual of Systematic Bacteriology. The Trust is currently based at the University of Georgia in Athens, GA, USA.

Bergey was elected in 1903 a fellow of the American Association for the Advancement of Science.

He was the first doctor to isolate the bacterium Actinomyces from a human being, in 1907.
