= Arteriovenous fistula =

Abnormal passageway between a vein and artery

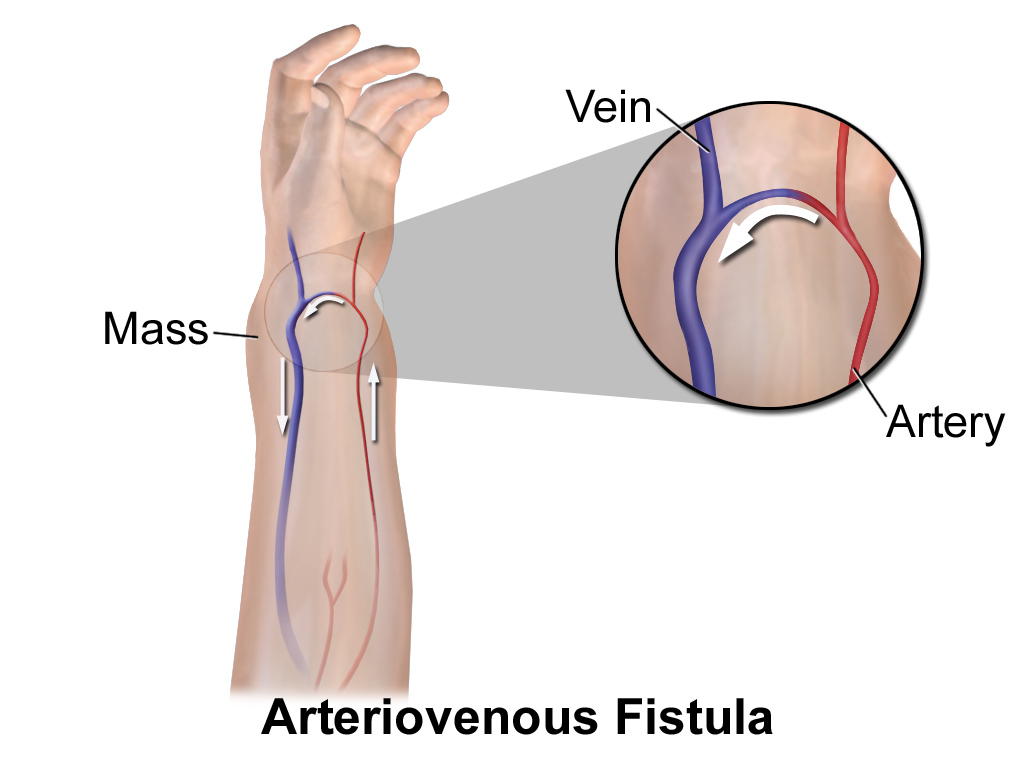
- Illustration of an arteriovenous fistula
- Specialty: Cardiology

An arteriovenous fistula is an abnormal connection or passageway between an artery and a vein. It may be congenital, surgically created for hemodialysis treatments, or acquired due to pathologic process, such as trauma or erosion of an arterial aneurysm.

== Clinical features ==
=== Pathological ===
Hereditary hemorrhagic telangiectasia is a condition where there is direct connection between arterioles and venules without intervening capillary beds, at the mucocutaneous region and internal bodily organs. Those who are affected by this conditions usually do not experience any symptoms. Difficulty in breathing is the most common symptom for those who experience symptoms.

Just like berry aneurysm, a cerebral arteriovenous malformation can rupture causing subarachnoid hemorrhage.

== Causes ==
The cause of this condition include

- Congenital (developmental defect)
- Rupture of arterial aneurysm into an adjacent vein
- Penetrating injuries
- Inflammatory necrosis of adjacent vessels
- Complication of catheter insertion rarely causes arteriovenous fistula. It is usually caused by brachial artery puncture because the brachial artery is located between two brachial veins.

Surgically created Cimino fistula is used as a vascular access for hemodialysis. Blood must be aspirated from the body of the patient, and since arteries are not easy to reach compared to the veins, blood may be aspirated from veins. The problem is that the walls of the veins are thin compared to those of the arteries. The AV fistula is the solution for this problem because, after 4–6 weeks, the walls of the veins become thicker due to the high arterial pressure. Thus, this vein can now tolerate needles during hemodialysis sessions.

== Mechanism ==
When an arteriovenous fistula is formed involving a major artery like the abdominal aorta, it can lead to a large decrease in peripheral resistance. This lowered peripheral resistance causes the heart to increase cardiac output to maintain proper blood flow to all tissues. The physical manifestations of this typically consist of a relatively normal systolic blood pressure accompanied by decreased diastolic blood pressure, resulting in a wider pulse pressure.

Normal blood flow in the brachial artery is 85 to 110 milliliters per minute (mL/min). After the creation of a fistula, the blood flow increases to 400–500 mL/min immediately, and 700–1,000 mL/min within 1 month. A brachiocephalic fistula above the elbow has a greater flow rate than a radiocephalic fistula at the wrist. Both the artery and the vein dilate and elongate in response to the greater blood flow and shear stress, but the vein dilates more and becomes "arterialized". In one study, the cephalic vein increased from 2.3 mm to 6.3 mm diameter after 2 months. When the vein is large enough to allow cannulation, the fistula is defined as "mature".

An arteriovenous fistula can increase preload. AV shunts also decrease the afterload of the heart. This is because the blood bypasses the arterioles which results in a decrease in the total peripheral resistance (TPR). AV shunts increase both the rate and volume of blood returning to the heart.

== Diagnosis ==
The diagnosis of this condition can be done via ultrasound

== See also ==
- Arteriovenous malformation
- Branham sign
- Carotid-cavernous fistula
- Fistula
- Human umbilical vein graft
- Pseudoaneurysm
- Vascular bypass
