= Actinomyces actinomycetemcomitans =

Scientific classification
- Domain: Bacteria
- Kingdom: Bacillati
- Phylum: Actinomycetota
- Class: Actinomycetes
- Order: Actinomycetales
- Family: Actinomycetaceae
- Genus: Actinomyces
- Species: A. actinomycetemcomitans

Binomial name
- Actinomyces actinomycetemcomitans Iinuma et al. 1994

Species of bacterium

"Actinomyces actinomycetemcomitans" is a species in the genus Actinomyces.
