= Actinomyces radicidentis =

Scientific classification
- Domain: Bacteria
- Kingdom: Bacillati
- Phylum: Actinomycetota
- Class: Actinomycetes
- Order: Actinomycetales
- Family: Actinomycetaceae
- Genus: Actinomyces
- Species: A. radicidentis

Binomial name
- Actinomyces radicidentis Collins et al. 2001

Type strain
- CCUG 36733; CIP 106352; DSM 15433

Species of bacterium

Actinomyces radicidentis is a species of gram-positive bacteria in the genus Actinomyces, first isolated from infected root canals of teeth. Once characterized, it has since been found to be present in failed root canal treatments. Its pathogenicity has been suggested to be due to an ability to form cell aggregates, held together by embedding in an extracellular matrix in host tissues. Like other pathogenic Actinomyces, Actinomyces radicidentis can persist in aprotected biofilm environment, allowing it to evade elimination by host defenses, including phagocytosis.
