= Ferdinand Karewski =

German surgeon (1858–1923)

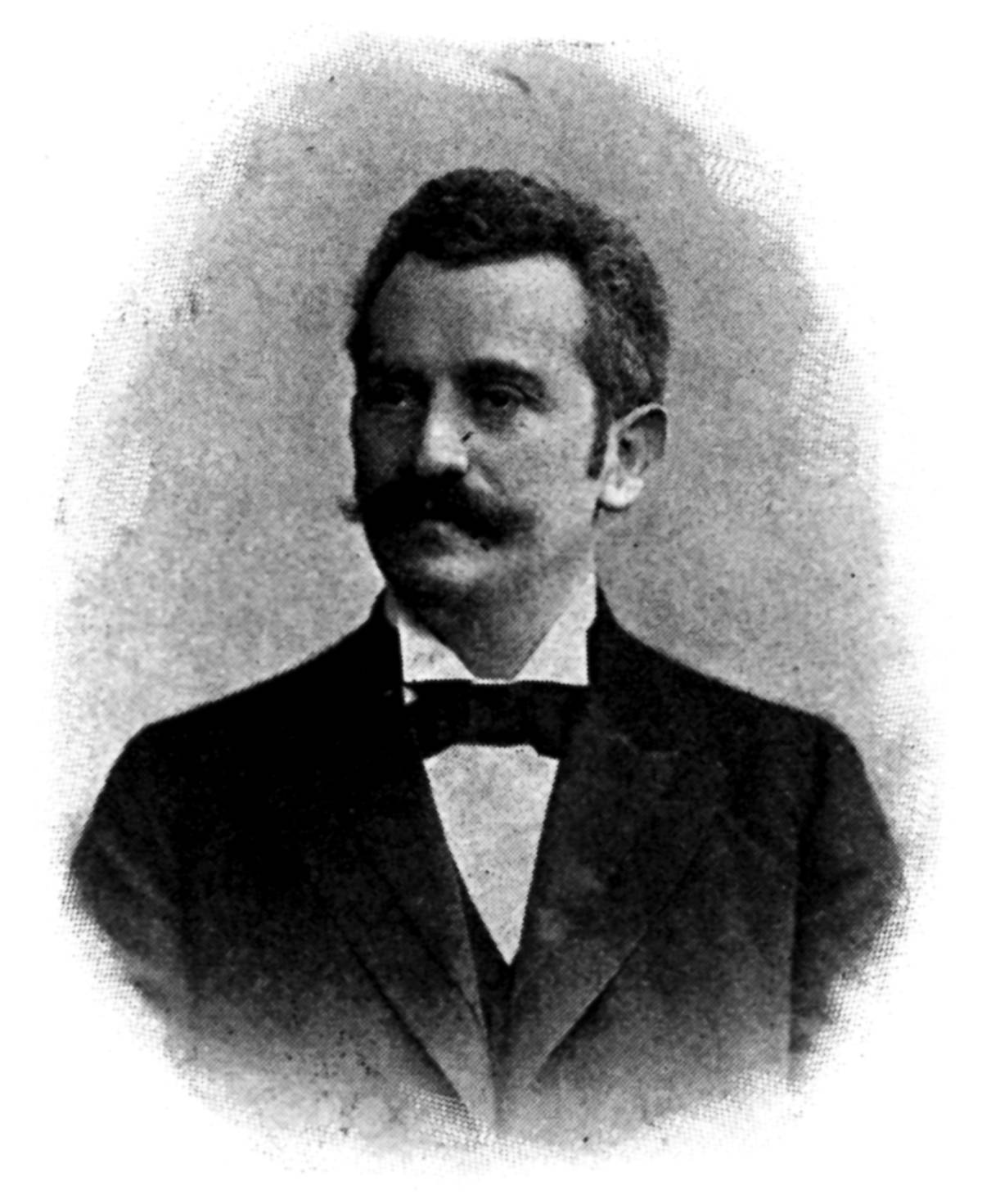
Ferdinand Karewski (1858–1923)

Ferdinand Karewski (5 November 1858 – 31 October 1923) was a German surgeon born in Stettin.

He studied medicine in Berlin, where one of his instructors was James Israel (1848–1926). He worked as a surgeon at the Jewish Hospital (Jüdischen Krankenhaus) in Berlin as an assistant, and later as director of the policlinic. He is remembered for experiments involving the effects of puerperal secretions.

== Selected publications ==
- Untersuchung über die Einwirkung auf den puerperaler Secrete thierischen organismus, (1882)
- Die chirurgischen Krankheiten des Kindesalters, (1894)
