= Actinomyces gerencseriae =

Scientific classification
- Domain: Bacteria
- Kingdom: Bacillati
- Phylum: Actinomycetota
- Class: Actinomycetes
- Order: Actinomycetales
- Family: Actinomycetaceae
- Genus: Actinomyces
- Species: A. gerencseriae

Binomial name
- Actinomyces gerencseriae Johnson et al. 1990

Species of bacterium

Actinomyces gerencseriae is a species of gram-positive bacteria in the genus Actinomyces once known as Actinomyces israelii serovar II.

A. gerencseriae was named for bacteriologist Mary Ann Gerencser.

A. gerencseriae can cause an infection in humans known as actinomycosis.
