= Streptomyces somaliensis =

Scientific classification
- Domain: Bacteria
- Kingdom: Bacillati
- Phylum: Actinomycetota
- Class: Actinomycetes
- Order: Streptomycetales
- Family: Streptomycetaceae
- Genus: Streptomyces
- Species: S. somaliensis

Binomial name
- Streptomyces somaliensis (Brumpt 1906) Waksman and Henrici 1948 (Approved Lists 1980)

Type strain
- ATCC 33201, CIP 733, DSM 40738, IMRU 1274, IP 733, JCM 12659, KCTC 9044, NCTC 11332, NRRL B-12077

Synonyms
- Indiella somaliensis

Species of bacterium

Streptomyces somaliensis is a proteolytic bacterium species from the genus of Streptomyces which has been isolated from a mycetoma from the foot of a man in Somalia. Streptomyces somaliensis is a human pathogen and can cause actinomycosis.

== See also ==
- List of Streptomyces species
