= Nicoladoni–Branham sign =

The Nicoladoni–Branham sign (also called Branham's sign, the Nicoladoni sign, or the Nicoladoni–Israel–Branham sign) is named after Carl Nicoladoni, who first noticed the phenomenon of the pulse slowing in a patient with right arm phlebarteriectasia when the brachialis artery proximal to it was compressed. In modern medicine, the sign is elicited when pressure is applied to an artery proximal to an arteriovenous fistula and said to be positive if the following occurs:

- Swelling reduces in size
- Bruit and thrill disappears
- Blood pressure rises
- Pulse rate and heart rate return to normal.

== Mechanism ==
In an AV fistula, there is shunting of blood from the arteries directly into a vein, bypassing the capillary beds. This causes a fall in peripheral vascular resistance. Because blood pressure is directly proportional to peripheral vascular resistance, in an AV fistula there is a fall in blood pressure and subsequent reflex tachycardia.

When the artery proximal to the fistula is compressed, blood is no longer shunted and the peripheral vascular resistance is increased suddenly. This causes relative hypertension within one or two heartbeats. Bradycardia soon follows due to the activation of the baroreceptors in the left ventricle (the Bezold–Jarisch reflex).

Locally, because no blood is being shunted, the swelling reduces and bruit/thrill disappears.

== Clinical significance ==
It helps differentiate the cause of chest pain between high-output cardiac failure (AV-shunting) and cardiac (organic) causes in ESRD patients on hemodialysis with an AV fistula. The former will improve while eliciting the sign, whereas the latter will not.
