= Carl Nicoladoni =

Austrian surgeon (1847–1902)

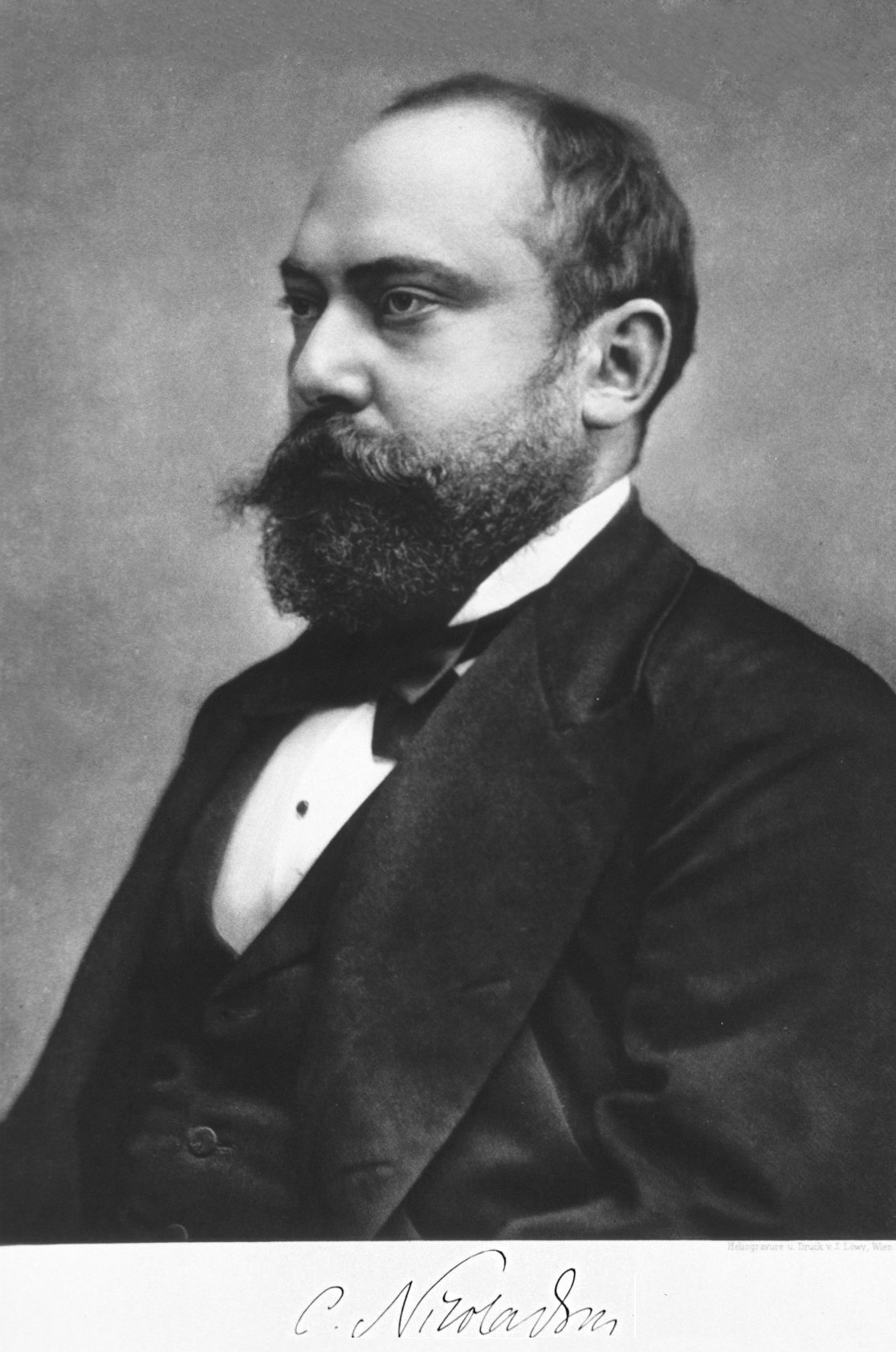
Carl Nicoladoni

Carl Nicoladoni (23 April 1847 – 4 December 1902) was an Austrian surgeon born in Vienna.

He received his medical doctorate from the University of Vienna, and was later a professor of surgery at the Universities of Innsbruck (from 1881) and Graz (from 1895).

Nicoladoni specialized in orthopedic and reconstructive surgery. He was particularly interested in research and diagnosis of scoliosis, publishing several treatises on the disorder. He also performed the first successful thumb replacement, an operation involving replacement of a boy's lost thumb with the second toe of his right foot.

Nicoladoni made contributions in regards to urogenital and gastrointestinal surgery. He introduced new surgical techniques for treatment of esophageal diverticulum as well as for torsion of the spermatic cord. He also investigated the possibilities of gastroenterostomic surgery.

== Works ==
- Die Architektur der Sskoliotischen Wirbelsaule (Architecture of the scoliotic spine, 1889).
- Die Architektur der Kindlichen Skoliose (Architecture of juvenile scoliosis, 1894).
- Die Skoliose des Lendensegmentes (Scoliosis of lumbar segments, 1894)
- Daumenplastik. Wiener klinische Wochenschrift (Toe to thumb replacement 1897, 10 : 663–670).

== See also ==
- Nicoladoni sign
