= Bergey's Manual of Systematic Bacteriology =

Manual for identifying prokaryotic organisms

Bergey's Manual of Systematic Bacteriology is the main resource for determining the identity of prokaryotic organisms, emphasizing bacterial species, using every characterizing aspect.

The manual was published subsequent to Bergey's Manual of Determinative Bacteriology, though the latter is still published as a guide for identifying unknown bacteria. First published in 1923 by David Hendricks Bergey, it is used to classify bacteria based on their structural and functional attributes by arranging them into specific familial orders. However, this process has become more empirical in recent years.

The Taxonomic Outline of Bacteria and Archaea is a derived publication indexing taxon names from version two of the manual. It used to be available for free from the Bergey's manual trust website until September 2018. Michigan State University provides an alternative version that indexes NamesforLife records.

The five-volume BMSB is officially replaced by Bergey's Manual of Systematics of Archaea and Bacteria (BMSAB), a continuously-updated online book, since 2015.

== Organization ==
The change in volume set to "Systematic Bacteriology" came in a new contract in 1980, whereupon the new style included "relationships between organisms" and had "expanded scope" overall. This new style was picked up for a four-volume set that first began publishing in 1984. The information in the volumes was separated as:

Volume 1 included information on all types of Gram-negative bacteria that were considered to have "medical and industrial importance." Volume 2 included information on all types of Gram-positive bacteria. Volume 3 deals with all of the remaining, slightly different Gram-negative bacteria, along with the Archaea. Volume 4 has information on filamentous actinomycetes and other, similar bacteria.

The current volumes differ drastically from previous volumes in that many higher taxa are not defined in terms of phenotype, but solely on 16S phylogeny, as is the case of the classes within Proteobacteria.

The current grouping is:

- Volume 1 (2001): The Archaea and the deeply branching and phototrophic Bacteria
- Volume 2 (2005): The Proteobacteria—divided into three books:
  - 2A: Introductory essays
  - 2B: The Gammaproteobacteria
  - 2C: Other classes of Proteobacteria
- Volume 3 (2009): The Firmicutes
- Volume 4 (2011): The Bacteroidetes, Spirochaetes, Tenericutes (Mollicutes), Acidobacteria, Fibrobacteres, Fusobacteria, Dictyoglomi, Gemmatimonadetes, Lentisphaerae, Verrucomicrobia, Chlamydiae, and Planctomycetes
- Volume 5 (in two parts) (2012): The Actinobacteria

== Bergey's Manual Trust ==
Bergey's Manual Trust was established in 1936 to sustain the publication of Bergey's Manual of Determinative Bacteriology and supplementary reference works. The Trust also recognizes individuals who have made outstanding contributions to bacterial taxonomy by presentation of the Bergey Award and Bergey Medal, jointly supported by funds from the Trust and from Springer, the publishers of the Manual.

Bergey's Manual Trust and John Wiley & Sons, Inc. co-publish the online encyclopedia Bergey's Manual of Systematics of Archaea and Bacteria (BMSAB). On 2019, the Trust decided to include phylogenomic in the BMSAB using the classification provided by the Genome Taxonomy Database (GTDB).

== Critical reception ==
The Annals of Internal Medicine described the volumes as "clearly written, precise, and easy to read" and "particularly designed for those interested in taxonomy."

== Editions ==
=== Bergey's Manual of Determinative Bacteriology ===
- Bergey, D.H., Harrison, F.C., Breed, R.S., Hammer, B.W. & Huntoon, F.M. (eds., 1923). Bergey's Manual of Determinative Bacteriology, 1st ed., The Williams & Wilkins Co, Baltimore, 442 p.
- Bergey, D.H., Harrison, F.C., Breed, R.S., Hammer, B.W. & Huntoon, F.M. (eds., 1925). Bergey's Manual of Determinative Bacteriology, 2nd ed., The Williams & Wilkins Co, Baltimore, 462 p.
- Bergey, D.H., Harrison, F.C., Breed, R.S., Hammer, B.W. & Huntoon, F.M. (eds., 1930). Bergey's Manual of Determinative Bacteriology, 3rd., The Williams and Wilkins Co., Baltimore, 589 p.
- Bergey, D.H., Breed, R.S., Hammer, B.W., Huntoon, F.M., Murray, E.G.D. & Harrison, F.C. (eds., 1934). Bergey's Manual of Determinative Bacteriology, 4th ed., The Williams & Wilkins Co, Baltimore.
- Bergey, D.H., Breed, R.S., Murray, E.G.D. & Hitchens, A.P. (eds., 1939). Bergey's Manual of Determinative Bacteriology, 5th ed., The Williams and Wilkins Co., Baltimore.
- Breed, R.S., Murray, E.G.D. & Hitchens, A.P. (eds., 1948). Bergey's Manual of Determinative Bacteriology, 6th ed., The Williams and Wilkins Co., Baltimore, .
- Breed, R.S., Murray, E.G.D. & Smith, N.R. (eds., 1957). Bergey's Manual of Determinative Bacteriology, 7th ed., The Williams and Wilkins Co., Baltimore, .
- Buchanan, R.E. & Gibbons, N.R. (eds., 1974). Bergey's Manual of Determinative Bacteriology, 8th ed., Williams & Wilkins. Baltimore.
- Holt, John G. (eds., 1994). Bergey's Manual of Determinative Bacteriology, 9th ed., Williams & Wilkins. Baltimore. ISBN 978-0683006032.

=== Bergey's Manual of Systematic Bacteriology, 1st ed. ===
- Krieg, N.R. & Holt, J.G. (eds., 1984). Bergey's Manual of Systematic Bacteriology, 1st ed., vol. 1, Williams and Wilkins, Baltimore.
- Sneath, P.H.A., Mair, N.S., Sharpe, M.E. & Holt, J.G. (eds., 1986). Bergey's Manual of Systematic Bacteriology, 1st ed., vol. 2, Williams & Wilkins, Baltimore.
- Staley, J.T., Bryant, M.P., Pfennig, N. & Holt, J.G. (eds., 1989). Bergey's Manual of Systematic Bacteriology, 1st ed., vol. 3, Williams and Wilkins, Baltimore.
- Williams, S.T., Sharpe, M.E. & Holt, J.G. (eds., 1989). Bergey's Manual of Systematic Bacteriology, 1st ed., vol. 4, Williams and Wilkins, Baltimore.

=== Bergey's Manual of Systematic Bacteriology, 2nd ed. ===
- Garrity, G.M., Boone, D.R. & Castenholz, R.W. (eds., 2001). Bergey's Manual of Systematic Bacteriology, 2nd ed., vol. 1, Springer-Verlag, New York, NY
- Brenner, D.J., Krieg, N.R., Staley, J.T. & Garrity, G.M. (eds., 2005). Bergey's Manual of Systematic Bacteriology, 2nd ed., vol. 2, parts A, B and C, Springer-Verlag, New York, NY.
- Vos, P., Garrity, G., Jones, D., Krieg, N.R., Ludwig, W., Rainey, F.A., Schleifer, K.-H. & Whitman, W.B. (eds., 2009). Bergey's Manual of Systematic Bacteriology, 2nd ed., vol. 3, Springer-Verlag, New York, NY.
- Krieg, N.R., Ludwig, W., Whitman, W.B., Hedlund, B.P., Paster, B.J., Staley, J.T., Ward, N. & Brown, D. (eds., 2010). Bergey's Manual of Systematic Bacteriology, 2nd ed., vol. 4, Springer-Verlag, New York, NY.
- Whitman, W.B., Goodfellow, M., Kämpfer, P., Busse, H.-J., Trujillo, M.E., Ludwig, W. & Suzuki, K.-i. (eds., 2012). Bergey's Manual of Systematic Bacteriology, 2nd ed., vol. 5, parts A and B, Springer-Verlag, New York, NY.

=== Other ===
- Buchanan, R.E., Holt, J.G. & Lessel Jr, E.F. (1966). Index Bergeyana: An Annotated Alphabetic Listing of Names of the Taxa of the Bacteria. The Williams and Wilkins Co., Baltimore, Md.
- Holt, J.G. (ed., 1977). The Shorter Bergey's Manual of Determinative Bacteriology, 8th ed., The Williams and Wilkins Co., Baltimore, Md.
- Gibbons, N.E., Pattee, K.B. & Holt, J.G. (eds., 1981). Supplement to Index Bergeyana. The Williams and Wilkins Co., Baltimore, Md.
- Whitman, W. B.; DeVos, P.; Dedysh, S.; Hedlund, B.; Kämpfer, P.; Rainey, F.; Trujillo, M. E.; Bowman, J. P.; Brown, D. R.; Glöckner, F. O.; Oren, A.; Paster, B. J.; Wade, W.; Ward, N.; Busse, H-J.; Reysenbach, A-L., eds. (2015). Bergey's manual of systematics of archaea and bacteria. Hoboken, New Jersey: John Wiley & Sons. ISBN 9781118960608.
