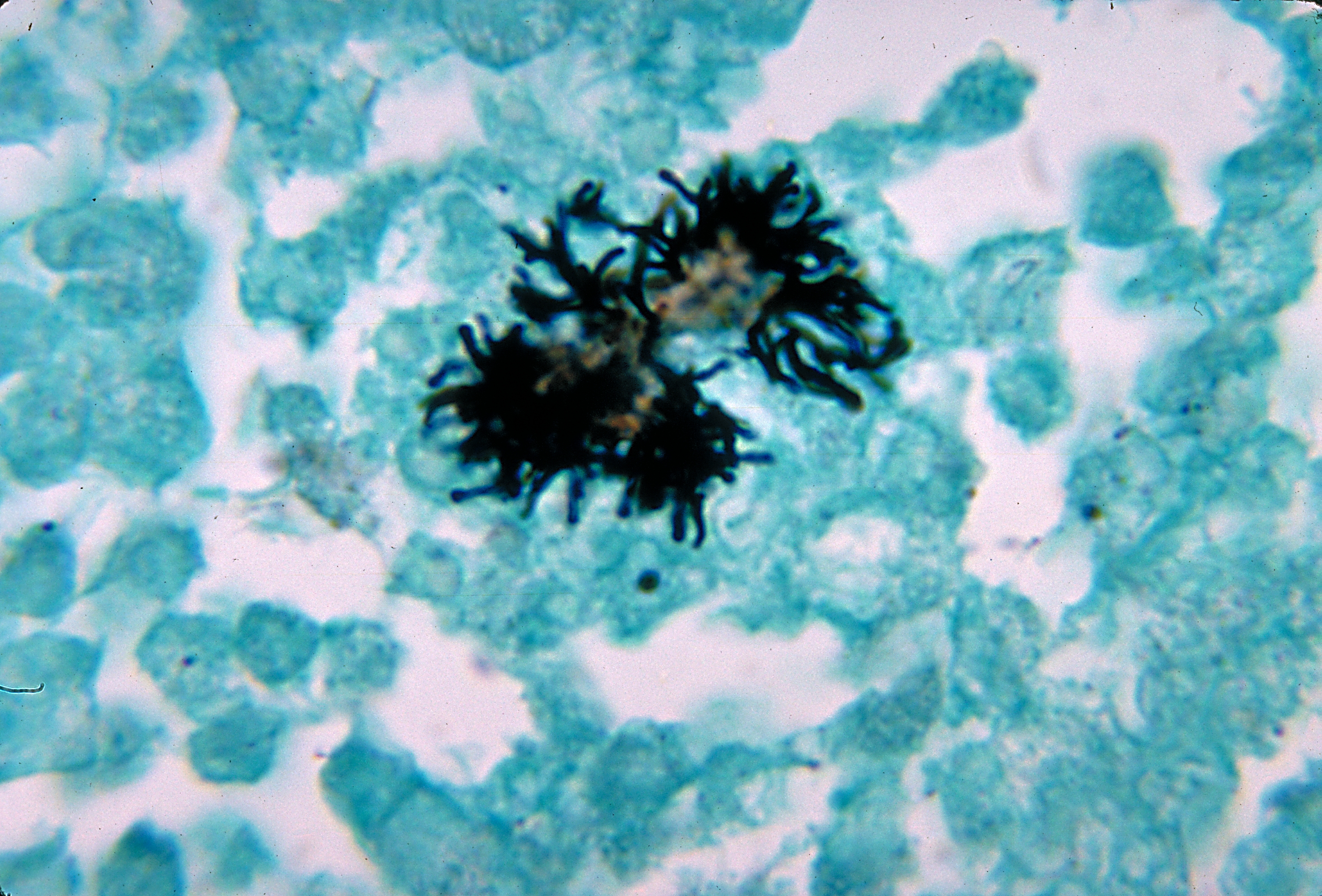
- Histopathological changes due to A. naeslundii.

Scientific classification
- Domain: Bacteria
- Kingdom: Bacillati
- Phylum: Actinomycetota
- Class: Actinomycetes
- Order: Actinomycetales
- Family: Actinomycetaceae
- Genus: Actinomyces
- Species: A. naeslundii

Binomial name
- Actinomyces naeslundii corrig. Thompson and Lovestedt 1951 (Approved Lists 1980)

Synonyms
- Actinomyces naeslundi Thompson and Lovestedt 1951 (Approved Lists 1980)

= Actinomyces naeslundii =

Species of bacterium

Actinomyces naeslundii is a Gram-positive, rod-shaped bacterium found in the mouth of humans. The species has been implicated in periodontal disease, as well as various tooth cavities. In other cases, A. naeslundii is associated with good oral health. It is one of the first bacteria to occupy the oral cavity and colonize the tooth's surface. It has also been isolated from women with bacterial vaginosis.

== Description ==
A. naeslundii appears Gram-positive and pleomorphic by microscopy. It does not form spores, and is considered anaerobic or microaerophilic.

In 2009, the species A. naeslundi was split. Bacteria formerly known as "Actinomyces naeslundi genospecies 2" were reclassified under the new species name Actinomyces oris. Those formerly known as "Actinomyces naeslundi genospecies WVA 963" were reclassified as Actinomyces johnsonii.

== Role in disease ==
Many species of the genus Actinomyces, including A. naeslundii, cause a chronic disease called actinomycosis, which is characterized by swelling and formation of an abscess which may exude pus. This can be accompanied by tissue fibrosis.

Infections of the mouth, face, and neck are the most commonly recognized infections; however, the thoracic region, abdomen, pelvis, and the central nervous system can also be involved.
