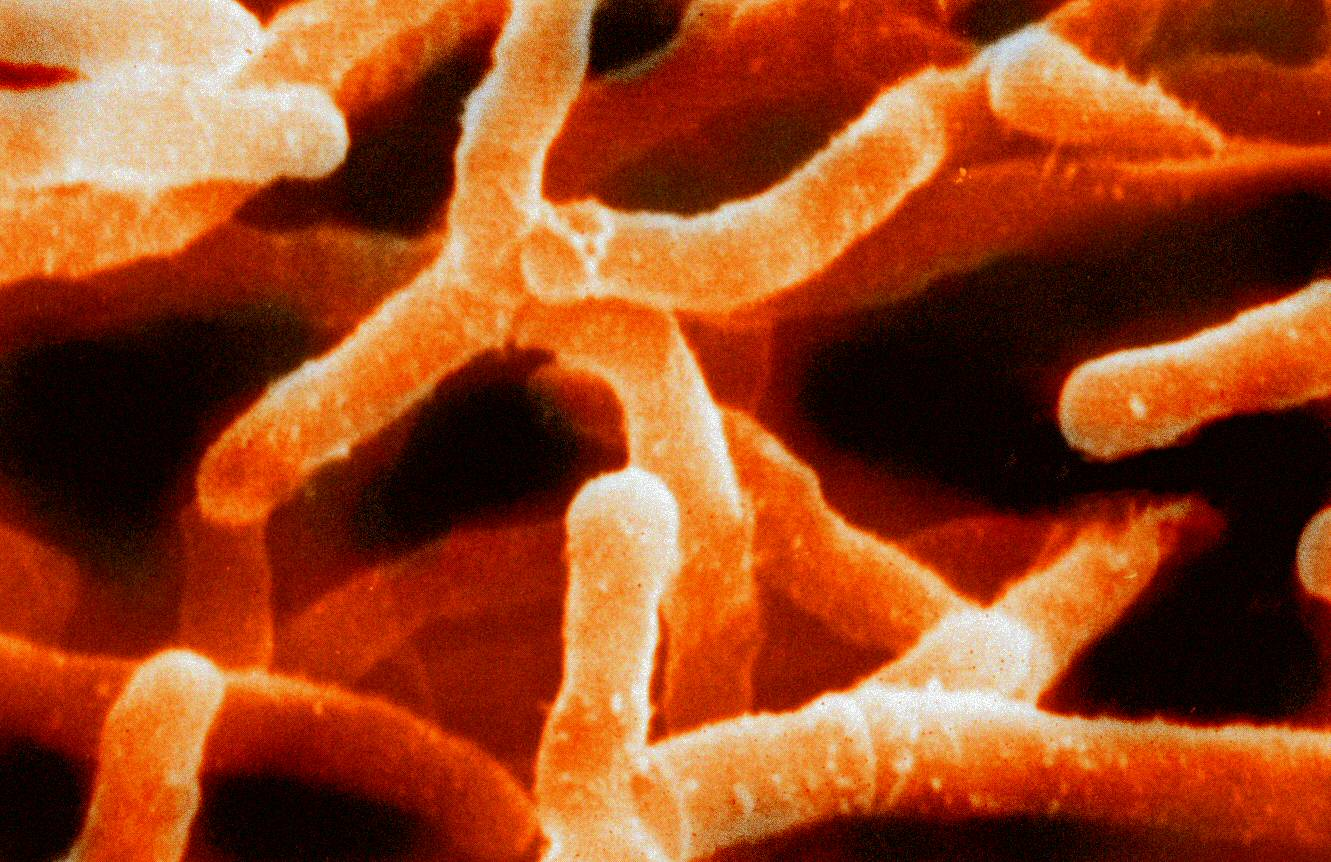
- Scanning electron micrograph of Actinomyces israelii

Scientific classification
- Domain: Bacteria
- Kingdom: Bacillati
- Phylum: Actinomycetota
- Class: Actinomycetes
- Order: Actinomycetales
- Family: Actinomycetaceae
- Genus: Actinomyces
- Species: A. israelii

Binomial name
- Actinomyces israelii (Kruse 1896) Lachner-Sandoval 1898 (Approved Lists 1980)

Type strain
- ATCC 12102; CCUG 18307; CIP 103259; DSM 43320; JCM 12964; NCTC 12972

Synonyms
- "Streptothrix israeli" Kruse 1896; "Actinobacterium israeli" (Kruse 1896) Sampietro 1908

= Actinomyces israelii =

Species of bacterium

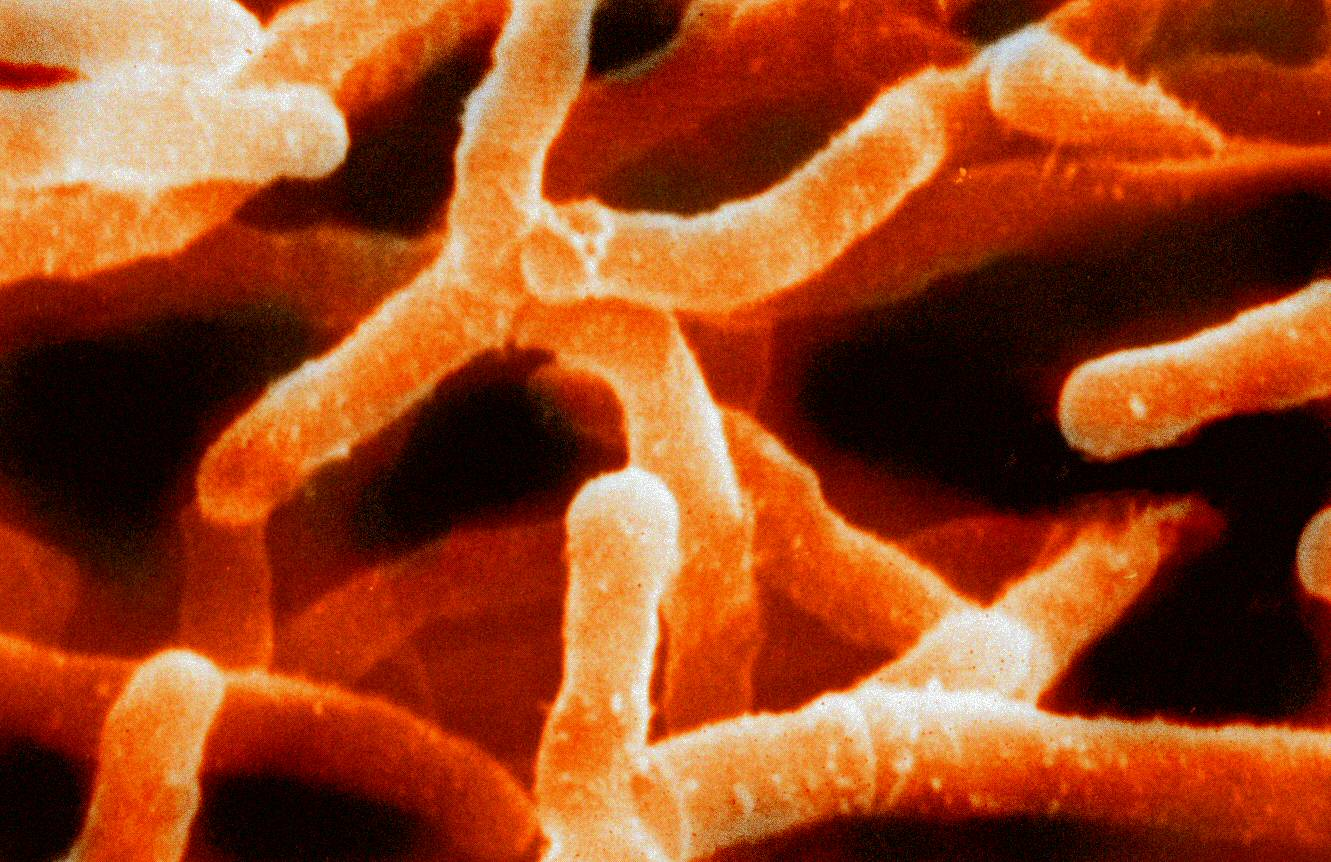
False color scanning electron micrograph of Actinomyces israelii

Actinomyces israelii is a species of Gram-positive, rod-shaped bacteria within the genus Actinomyces. Known to live commensally on and within humans, A. israelii is an opportunistic pathogen and a cause of actinomycosis. Many physiologically diverse strains of the species are known to exist, though not all are strict anaerobes. It was named after the German surgeon James Israel (1848–1926), who studied the organism for the first time in 1878.

== Pathogenesis ==
Actinomycosis is most frequently caused by A. israelii. It is a normal colonizer of the vagina, colon, and mouth. Infection is established first by a breach of the mucosal barrier during various procedures (dental, gastrointestinal), aspiration, or pathologies such as diverticulitis. The chronic phase of this disease is also known as the "classic phase" because the acute, early phase is often missed by health care providers. This is characterized by slow, contiguous growth that ignores tissue planes and forms a sinus tract that can spontaneously heal and recur, leading to a densely fibrotic lesion. This lesion is often characterized as "wooden". Sulfur granules form in a central purulence surrounded by neutrophils. This conglomeration of organisms is virtually diagnostic of A. israelii.

== Treatment ==
A. israelii is curable and can be treated with antibiotics. Both a sodium hypochlorite solution and calcium hydroxide can be highly effective in killing A. israelii when it has caused infection in the mouth.
