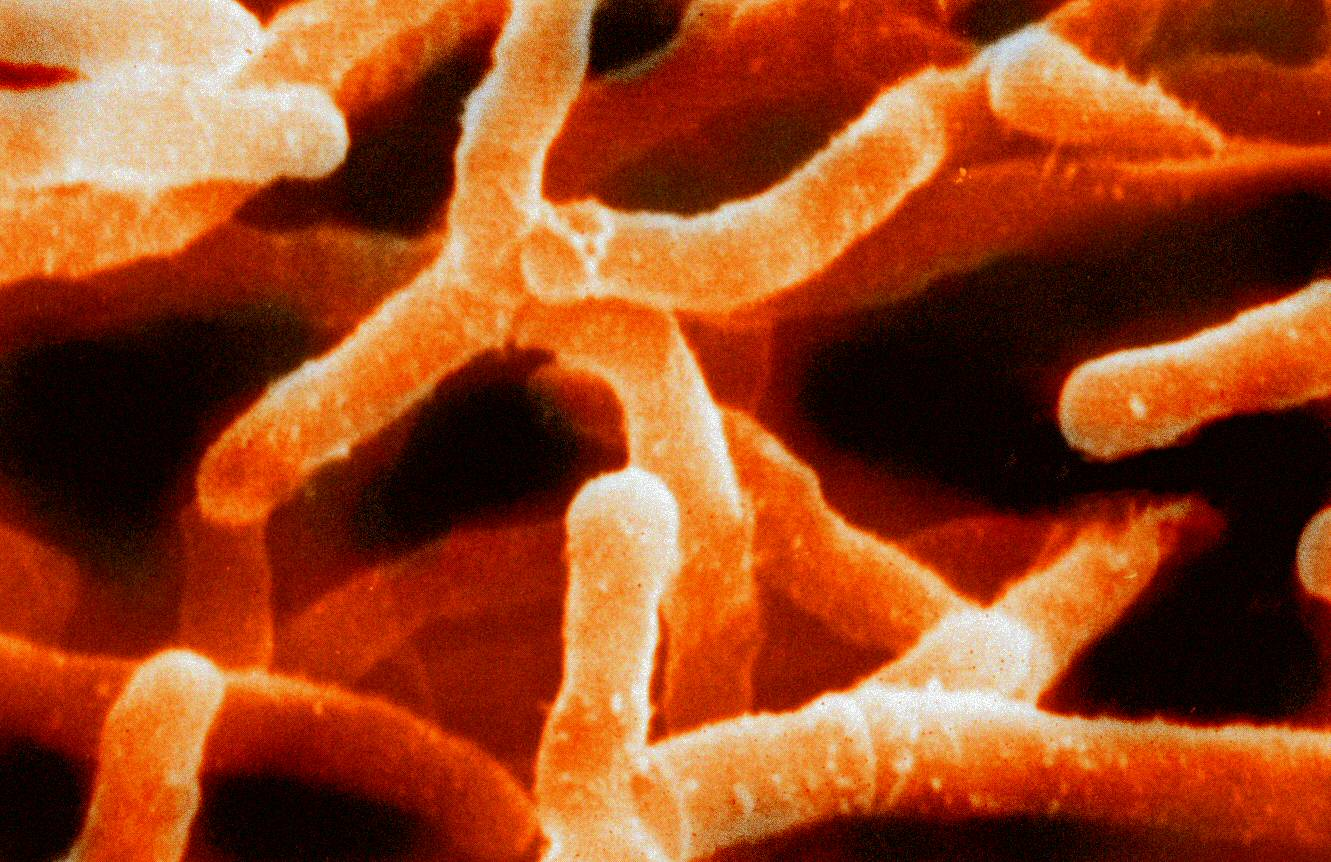
- Scanning electron micrograph of Actinomyces israelii

Scientific classification
- Domain: Bacteria
- Kingdom: Bacillati
- Phylum: Actinomycetota
- Class: Actinomycetes
- Order: Actinomycetales
- Family: Actinomycetaceae
- Genus: Actinomyces; Harz 1877 (Approved Lists 1980)

Species
- See text.

Synonyms
- "Actinobacterium" Sampietro 1908; "Odontomyces" Howell et al. 1965

= Actinomyces =

Genus of bacteria

Actinomyces is a genus of the Actinomycetia class of bacteria. They all are Gram-positive and facultatively anaerobic, growing best under anaerobic conditions. While individual bacteria are rod-shaped, Actinomyces colonies form fungus-like branched networks of hyphae. The aspect of these colonies initially led to the incorrect assumption that the organism was a fungus and to the name Actinomyces, "ray fungus" (from Greek actis, ray or beam, and mykes, fungus).

Actinomyces species are ubiquitous, occurring in soil and in the microbiota of animals, including the human microbiota. They are known for the important role they play in soil ecology; they produce a number of enzymes that help degrade organic plant material, lignin, and chitin. Thus, their presence is important in the formation of compost. Certain species are commensal in the skin flora, oral flora, gut flora, and vaginal flora of humans and livestock. They are also known for causing diseases in humans and livestock, usually when they opportunistically gain access to the body's interior through wounds. As with other opportunistic infections, people with immunodeficiency are at higher risk. In all of the preceding traits and in their branching filament formation, they bear similarities to Nocardia.

Like various other anaerobes, Actinomyces species are fastidious, thus not easy to culture and isolate. Clinical laboratories do culture and isolate them, but a negative result does not rule out infection, because it may be due simply to reluctance to grow in vitro.

== Genomics ==
Phylogenetic trees based on 16S ribosomal RNA (16SrRNA) sequences have shown that the genus Actinomyces is quite diverse, exhibiting polyphyletic branching into several clusters. The genera Actinomyces and Mobiluncus form a monophyletic clade in a phylogenetic tree constructed using RpoB, RpoC, and DNA gyrase B protein sequences. This clade is also strongly supported by a conserved signature indel consisting of a three-amino-acid insertion in isoleucine tRNA synthetase found only in the species of the genera Actinomyces and Mobiluncus.

== Pathology ==
Actinomycota are normally present in the gingiva, and are the most common cause of infection in dental procedures and oral abscesses. Many Actinomyces species are opportunistic pathogens of humans and other mammals, particularly in the oral cavity. In rare cases, these bacteria can cause actinomycosis, a disease characterized by the formation of abscesses in the mouth, lungs, or the gastrointestinal tract. Actinomycosis is most frequently caused by A. israelii, which may also cause endocarditis, though the resulting symptoms may be similar to those resulting from infections by other bacterial species.

The genus is typically the cause of oral-cervicofacial disease. It is characterized by a painless "lumpy jaw". Lymphadenopathy is uncommon in this form of the disease. Another form of actinomycosis is thoracic disease, which is often misdiagnosed as a neoplasm, as it forms a mass that extends to the chest wall. It arises from aspiration of organisms from the oropharynx. Symptoms include chest pain, fever, and weight loss. Abdominal disease is another manifestation of actinomycosis. This can lead to a sinus tract that drains to the abdominal wall or the perianal area. Symptoms include fever, abdominal pain, and weight loss. Actinomyces species have also been shown to infect the central nervous system in a dog "without history or evidence of previous trauma or other organ involvement."

Pelvic actinomycosis is a rare but proven complication of use of intrauterine devices. In extreme cases, pelvic abscesses might develop. Treatment of pelvic actinomycosis associated with intrauterine devices involves removal of the device and antibiotic treatment.

== Diagnosis ==
Actinomycosis may be considered when a patient has chronic progression of disease across tissue planes that is mass-like at times, sinus tract development that may heal and recur, and refractory infection after a typical course of antibiotics.

== Treatment ==
Treatment for actinomycosis consists of antibiotics such as penicillin or amoxicillin for 5 to 12 months, as well as surgery if the disease is extensive.

== Species ==
The genus Actinomyces comprises the following species:

- "A. actinomycetemcomitans" Iinuma et al. 1994
- "A. bouchesdurhonensis" Fonkou et al. 2018
- A. bovis Harz 1877 (Approved Lists 1980)
- A. bowdenii Pascual et al. 1999
- "A. capricornis" Saito et al. 2021
- A. catuli Hoyles et al. 2001
- "A. culturomici" Fonkou et al. 2018
- A. dentalis Hall et al. 2005
- A. denticolens Dent and Williams 1984
- A. faecalis Zhou et al. 2021
- A. gaoshouyii Meng et al. 2017
- A. gerencseriae Johnson et al. 1990
- "A. glycerinitolerans" Palakawong Na Ayudthaya et al. 2016
- A. graevenitzii Pascual Ramos et al. 1997
- A. haliotis Hyun et al. 2014
- "A. houstonensis" Clarridge and Zhang 2002
- A. howellii Dent and Williams 1984
- "A. ihuae" Fonkou et al. 2018
- "A. ihumii" Ndongo et al. 2016
- A. israelii (Kruse 1896) Lachner-Sandoval 1898 (Approved Lists 1980)
- A. johnsonii Henssge et al. 2009
- A. lilanjuaniae Li et al. 2019
- "A. lingnae" Clarridge and Zhang 2002
- A. marmotae Yang et al. 2021
- "A. marseillensis" Fonkou et al. 2018
- A. massiliensis Renvoise et al. 2009
- "A. mediterranea" Fonkou et al. 2018
- "A. minihominis" Bilen et al. 2018
- A. naeslundii corrig. Thompson and Lovestedt 1951 (Approved Lists 1980)
- "A. oralis" Fonkou et al. 2018
- A. oricola Hall et al. 2003
- A. oris Henssge et al. 2009
- "A. pacaensis" Fonkou et al. 2018
- "A. polynesiensis" Cimmino et al. 2016
- A. procaprae Yang et al. 2021
- "A. provencensis" Ndongo et al. 2017
- A. qiguomingii Zhu et al. 2020
- A. radicidentis Collins et al. 2001
- A. respiraculi Zhou et al. 2021
- A. ruminicola An et al. 2006
- A. slackii Dent and Williams 1986
- "A. succiniciruminis" Palakawong Na Ayudthaya et al. 2016
- A. timonensis Renvoise et al. 2010
- A. trachealis Zhou et al. 2021
- "A. urinae" Morand et al. 2016
- A. urogenitalis Nikolaitchouk et al. 2000
- A. viscosus (Howell et al. 1965) Georg et al. 1969 (Approved Lists 1980)
- A. vulturis Meng et al. 2017
- A. weissii Hijazin et al. 2012
- A. wuliandei Zhu et al. 2020

== Gallery ==
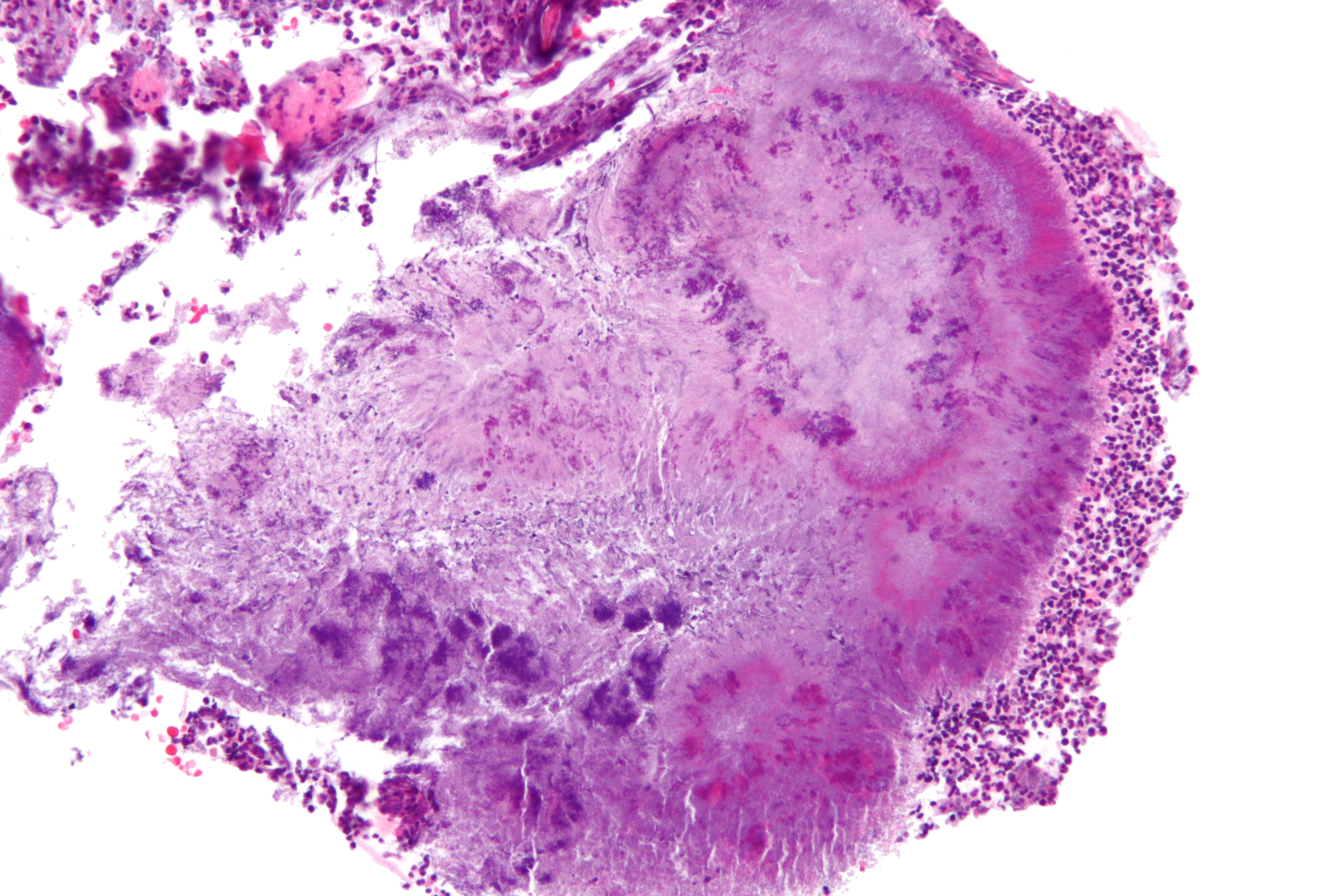
Micrograph of actinomycosis, H&E stain

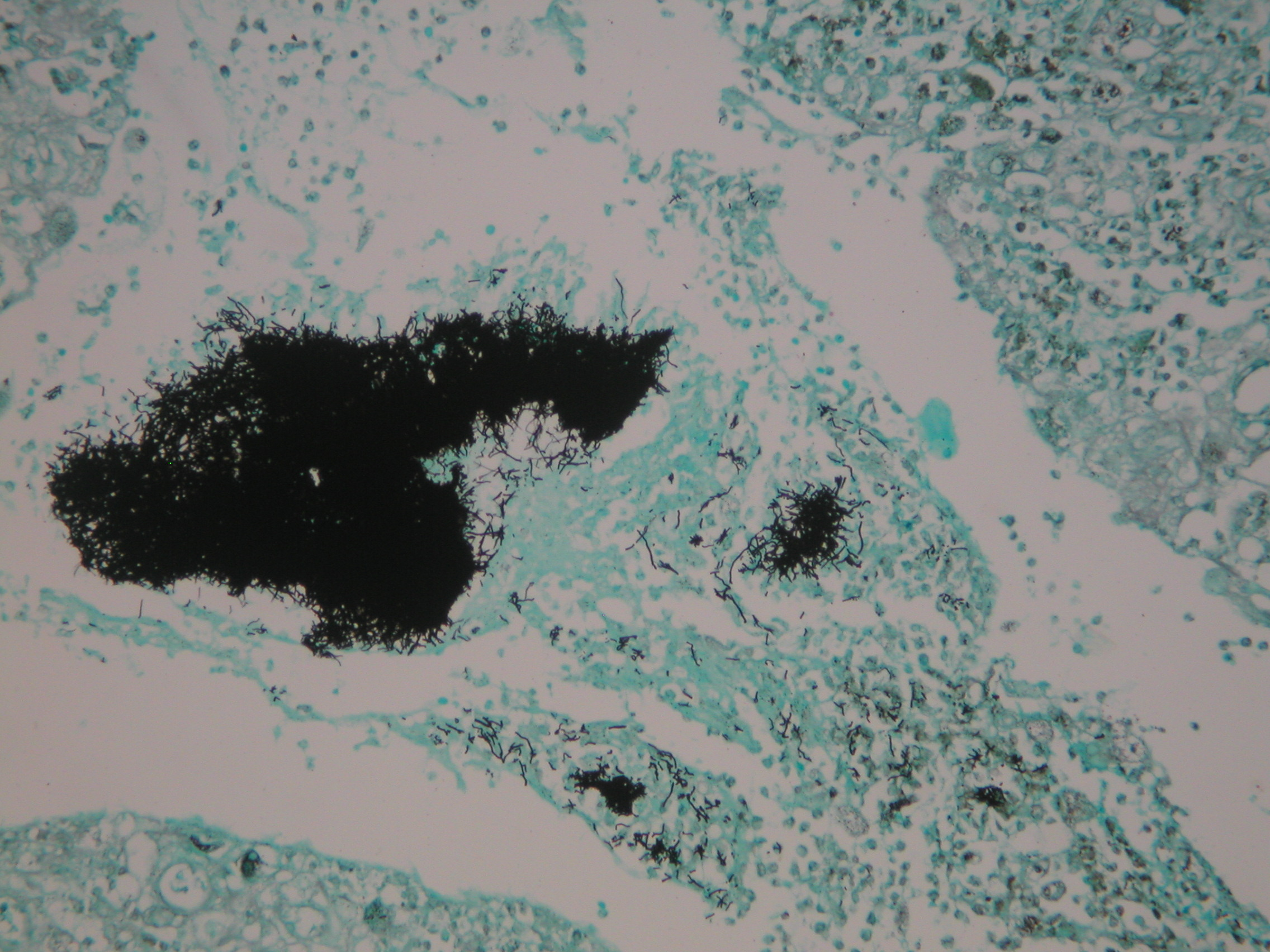
Micrograph of actinomycosis, GMS stain

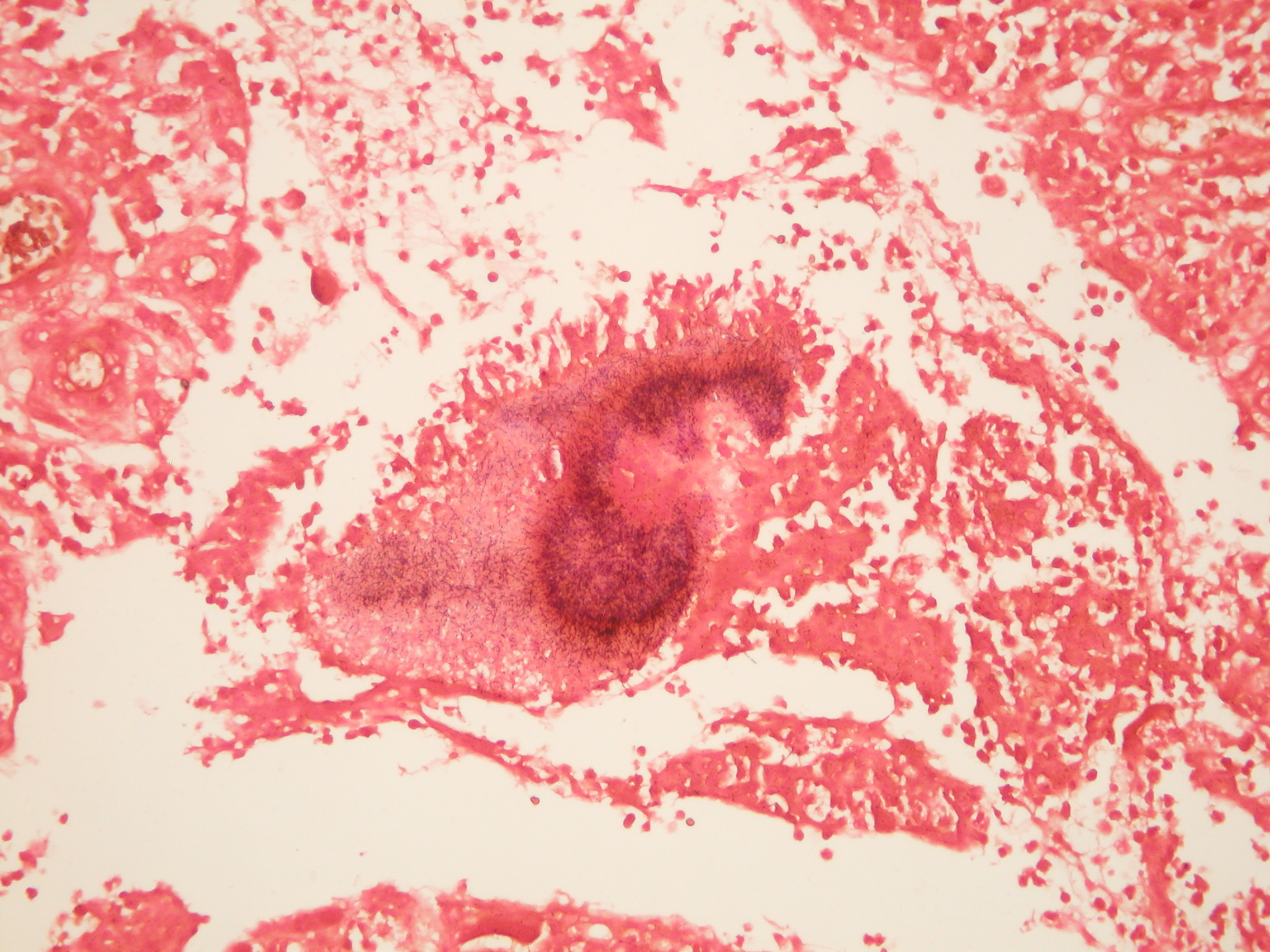
Micrograph of actinomycosis, Gram stain

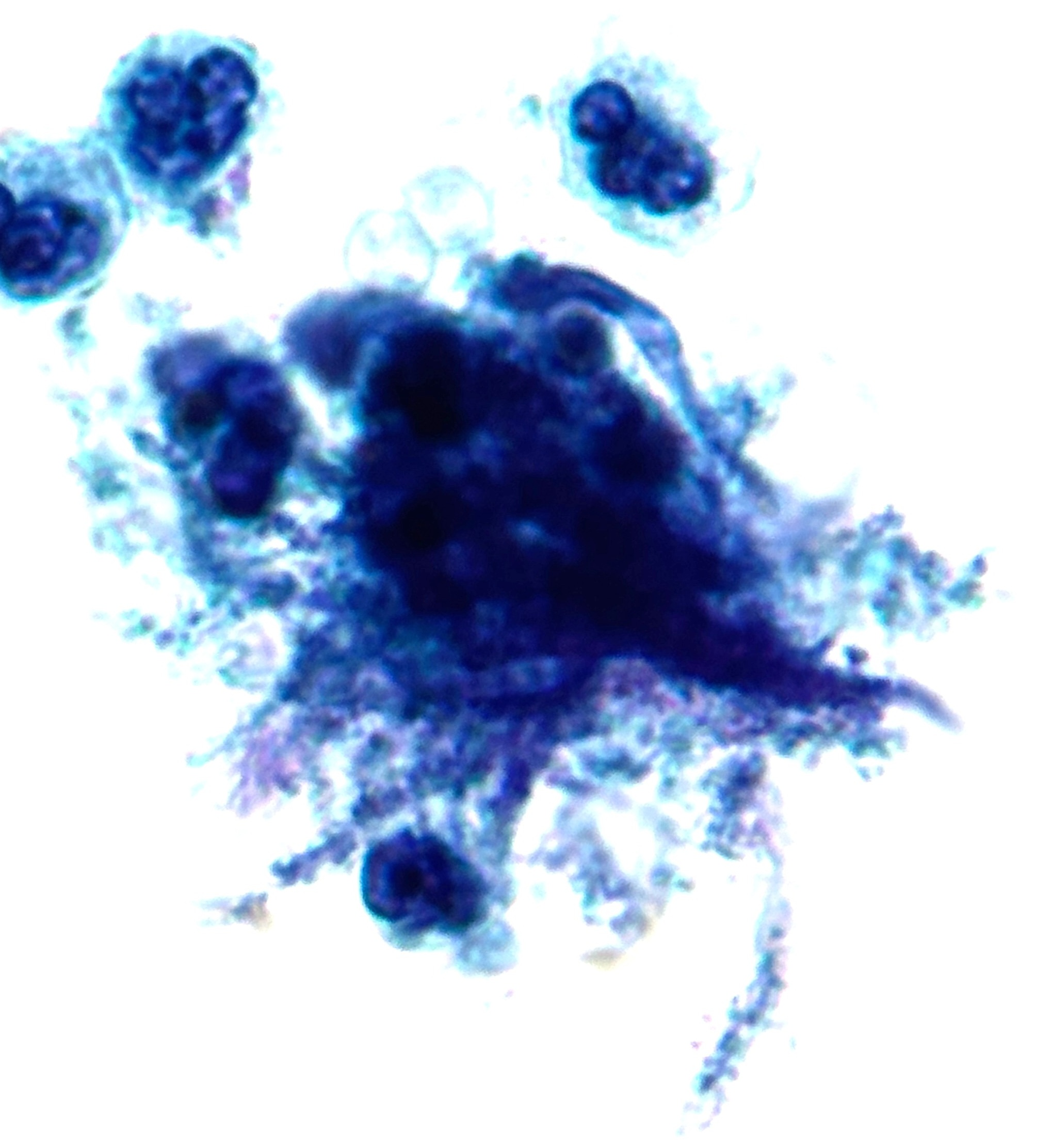
Actinomyces on Pap test: dense basophilic “cotton-ball” colonies with radiating, tangled filamentous organisms, surrounded by neutrophil granulocytes.
