= Isoptericola hypogeus =

Scientific classification
- Domain: Bacteria
- Kingdom: Bacillati
- Phylum: Actinomycetota
- Class: Actinomycetes
- Order: Micrococcales
- Family: Promicromonosporaceae
- Genus: Isoptericola
- Species: I. hypogeus

Binomial name
- Isoptericola hypogeus Groth et al. 2005

Type strain
- CD12E2-119; CIP 108902; DSM 16849; HKI 0342; JCM 14325; JCM 15589; NCIMB 14033

Species of bacterium

Isoptericola hypogeus is a bacterium from the genus Isoptericola which has been isolated from the catacomb of Domitilla in Rome, Italy.
