= Promicromonospora aerolata =

Scientific classification
- Domain: Bacteria
- Kingdom: Bacillati
- Phylum: Actinomycetota
- Class: Actinomycetes
- Order: Micrococcales
- Family: Promicromonosporaceae
- Genus: Promicromonospora
- Species: P. aerolata

Binomial name
- Promicromonospora aerolata Busse et al. 2003

Type strain
- CCM 7043; CIP 108163; DSM 15943; IFO 16526; JCM 14119; NBRC 16526; V54A

Species of bacterium

Promicromonospora aerolata is a bacterium from the genus Promicromonospora which has been isolated from air from the Vergilius Chapel in Vienna, Austria.
