= Xylanimonas ulmi =

Scientific classification
- Domain: Bacteria
- Kingdom: Bacillati
- Phylum: Actinomycetota
- Class: Actinomycetes
- Order: Micrococcales
- Family: Promicromonosporaceae
- Genus: Xylanimonas
- Species: X. ulmi

Binomial name
- Xylanimonas ulmi (Rivas et al. 2004) Heo et al. 2020

Type strain
- CECT 5730; CECT 5731; DSM 16932; JCM 14284; LMG 21721; XIL12; XIL08

Synonyms
- Xylanibacterium ulmi Rivas et al. 2004

Species of bacterium

Xylanimonas ulmi is a Gram-positive, aerobic, rod-shaped and non-motile bacterium from the genus Xylanimonas which has been isolated from decayed wood of the tree Ulmus nigra in Salamanca, Spain.
