= Myceligenerans crystallogenes =

Scientific classification
- Domain: Bacteria
- Kingdom: Bacillati
- Phylum: Actinomycetota
- Class: Actinomycetes
- Order: Micrococcales
- Family: Promicromonosporaceae
- Genus: Myceligenerans
- Species: M. crystallogenes

Binomial name
- Myceligenerans crystallogenes Groth et al. 2006

Type strain
- CATSakt CD12E2-027; CD12E2-27; DSM 17134; HKI 0369; JCM 14326; NCIMB 14061; VTT E-032285

Species of bacterium

Myceligenerans crystallogenes is a xylan-degrading bacterium from the genus Myceligenerans which has been isolated from tufa from the Catacomb of Domitilla in Rome, Italy.
