= Xylanimonas cellulosilytica =

Scientific classification
- Domain: Bacteria
- Kingdom: Bacillati
- Phylum: Actinomycetota
- Class: Actinomycetes
- Order: Micrococcales
- Family: Promicromonosporaceae
- Genus: Xylanimonas
- Species: X. cellulosilytica

Binomial name
- Xylanimonas cellulosilytica Rivas et al. 2003

Type strain
- CECT 5975; CIP 108193; DSM 15894; JCM 12276; KCTC 9989; LMG 20990; NBRC 107835; XIL07

Species of bacterium

Xylanimonas cellulosilytica is a Gram-positive, xylanolytic, aerobic, coccoid and non-motile bacterium from the genus Xylanimonas which has been isolated from a decayed tree (Ulmus nigra) in Salamanca, Spain. Xylanimonas cellulosilytica has the ability to hydrolyze cellulose and xylan.
