= Promicromonospora vindobonensis =

Scientific classification
- Domain: Bacteria
- Kingdom: Bacillati
- Phylum: Actinomycetota
- Class: Actinomycetes
- Order: Micrococcales
- Family: Promicromonosporaceae
- Genus: Promicromonospora
- Species: P. vindobonensis

Binomial name
- Promicromonospora vindobonensis Busse et al. 2003

Type strain
- CCM 7044; CIP 108164; DSM 15942; IFO 16525; JCM 14120; NBRC 16525; V45

Species of bacterium

Promicromonospora vindobonensis is a bacterium from the genus Promicromonospora which has been isolated from air from the Virgilkapelle in Vienna, Austria.
