= Black Irish =

Black Irish may refer to:

- Black people in Ireland, people of African or other Black heritage holding Irish citizenship
- Black Irish (folklore), a purported subset of Irish people exhibiting relatively dark features

== Other uses ==
- Black Irish (album), 2017 music album by American singer-songwriter Shannon McNally
- Black Irish (film), 2007 independent film by Brad Gann
- Black Irish Band, American folk music musical group
- Black Irish Books, publishing house of American author Steven Pressfield
- Black Irish Elm, wych elm cultivar originally discovered in Ireland
