= Promicromonospora kroppenstedtii =

Scientific classification
- Domain: Bacteria
- Kingdom: Bacillati
- Phylum: Actinomycetota
- Class: Actinomycetes
- Order: Micrococcales
- Family: Promicromonosporaceae
- Genus: Promicromonospora
- Species: P. kroppenstedtii

Binomial name
- Promicromonospora kroppenstedtii Alonso-Vega et al. 2008

Type strain
- DSM 19349; JCM 16033; LMG 24382; RS16

Species of bacterium

Promicromonospora kroppenstedtii is a bacterium from the genus Promicromonospora which has been isolated from sandy soil from Zamora, Spain.
