= Isoptericola halotolerans =

Scientific classification
- Domain: Bacteria
- Kingdom: Bacillati
- Phylum: Actinomycetota
- Class: Actinomycetes
- Order: Micrococcales
- Family: Promicromonosporaceae
- Genus: Isoptericola
- Species: I. halotolerans

Binomial name
- Isoptericola halotolerans Zhang et al. 2005

Type strain
- DSM 16376; JCM 13590; KCTC 19046; NBRC 104116; YIM70177

Species of bacterium

Isoptericola halotolerans is a Gram-positive, moderately halophilic and non-motile bacterium from the genus Isoptericola which has been isolated from soil in Qinghai Province, China.
