= Promicromonospora endophytica =

Scientific classification
- Domain: Bacteria
- Kingdom: Bacillati
- Phylum: Actinomycetota
- Class: Actinomycetes
- Order: Micrococcales
- Family: Promicromonosporaceae
- Genus: Promicromonospora
- Species: P. endophytica

Binomial name
- Promicromonospora endophytica Kaewkla and Franco 2012

Type strain
- DSM 23716; EUM 273; NRRL B-24816

Species of bacterium

Promicromonospora endophytica is a Gram-positive and aerobic bacterium from the genus Promicromonospora which has been isolated from the surface of Eucalyptus microcarpa root, found in Bedford Park, Adelaide, Australia.
