= Promicromonospora xylanilytica =

Scientific classification
- Domain: Bacteria
- Kingdom: Bacillati
- Phylum: Actinomycetota
- Class: Actinomycetes
- Order: Micrococcales
- Family: Promicromonosporaceae
- Genus: Promicromonospora
- Species: P. xylanilytica

Binomial name
- Promicromonospora xylanilytica Qin et al. 2012

Type strain
- CCTCC AA 208046; DSM 21603; YIM 61515

Species of bacterium

Promicromonospora xylanilytica is a Gram-positive, non-spore-forming and xylan-degrading bacterium from the genus Promicromonospora which has been isolated from the leaves of the plant Maytenus austroyunnanensis in Xishuangbanna, China.
