= Cellulosimicrobium funkei =

Scientific classification
- Domain: Bacteria
- Kingdom: Bacillati
- Phylum: Actinomycetota
- Class: Actinomycetes
- Order: Micrococcales
- Family: Promicromonosporaceae
- Genus: Cellulosimicrobium
- Species: C. funkei

Binomial name
- Cellulosimicrobium funkei Brown et al. 2006

Type strain
- ATCC BAA-886; CCUG 50705; CDC JB6122ot; CDC W6122; CIP 108915; DSM 16025; JCM 14302; NBRC 104118; VTT E-072700; W6122

Species of bacterium

Cellulosimicrobium funkei is a Gram-positive and aerobic bacterium from the genus of Cellulosimicrobium which is a rare opportunistic pathogen in humans.
