= Cellulosimicrobium cellulans =

Scientific classification
- Domain: Bacteria
- Kingdom: Bacillati
- Phylum: Actinomycetota
- Class: Actinomycetes
- Order: Micrococcales
- Family: Promicromonosporaceae
- Genus: Cellulosimicrobium
- Species: C. cellulans

Binomial name
- Cellulosimicrobium cellulans (Metcalfe and Brown 1957) Schumann et al. 2001

Type strain
- ATCC 12830; BCRC 17274; CCRC 17274; CCUG 50776; CECT 4282; CFBP 4267; CIP 103404; DSM 43189; DSM 43879; DSMZ 43879; HAMBI 95; IAM 14866; IFO 15516; IMET 7404; JCM 9965; KCTC 1771; KCTC 3259; KCTC 3411; LMG 16221; NBIMCC 1642; NBRC 15516; NCIB 8868; NCIMB 8868; NCTC 8868; NRRL B-2768; VKM Ac-1412

Synonyms
- Brevibacterium fermentans Chatelain and Second 1966 (Approved Lists 1980); Brevibacterium lyticum Takayama et al. 1960 (Approved Lists 1980); Cellulomonas cartae Stackebrandt and Kandler 1980; Cellulomonas cellulans (Metcalfe and Brown 1957) Stackebrandt and Keddie 1988; Nocardia cellulans Metcalfe and Brown 1957 (Approved Lists 1980); Oerskovia xanthineolytica Lechevalier 1972 (Approved Lists 1980)

Species of bacterium

Cellulosimicrobium cellulans is a Gram-positive bacterium from the genus of Cellulosimicrobium. Cellulosimicrobium cellulans can cause rare opportunistic infections. The strain EB-8-4 of this species can be used for stereoselective allylic hydroxylation of D-limonene to (+)-trans-carveol.

== Biology ==
=== Morphology and features ===
Cellulosimicrobium cellulans is a pleomorphic Gram-positive bacteria. Initially, C.cellulans are rod-shaped bacilli that become more coccoid as the bacteria grows and matures. C. cellulans may also form branches or filaments, allowing the bacteria to better adhere to structures (including implanted devices and catheters) and allow for communication between cells.

C. cellulans is a facultative anaerobic organism, growing from both aerobic and anaerobic media conditions such as blood culture bottles. C. cellulans is catalase positive.

=== Metabolism ===
C. cellulans produces endo-β-1,3-glucanase family glucanases and mannanases. These three enzymes are particularly effective in breaking down the cell walls of yeast, so C. cellulans is considered a major source of yeast-lytic enzymes.

C. cellulans produce a variety of degradative enzymes, such as beta-glucosidase, protease, glycoside hydrolase, and chitinase. As a result, C. cellulans is capable of biodegrading xylans and celluloses and performing a role in alcohol fermentation. One significant compound the bacteria can biodegrade is benzo(a)pyrene (BaP). BaP is a polycyclic aromatic hydrocarbon (PAH), well-known organic pollutant associated with properties of teratogenicity, mutagenicity, and carcinogenicity. BaP is a degradation-resistant compound; thus, it is more inclined to accumulate in the environment. While able to degrade easily in aerobic environments, BaP is more commonly found in anaerobic environments in nature. C. cellulans can biodegrade BaP in these anaerobic environments utilizing its degradative enzymes.

Based on the automatic genome annotation and pathway reconstruction server named Kaas, three Cellulosimicrobium strains, including C. cellulans, metabolism pathways were reconstructed. The data revealed a conserved set of central pathways such as glycolysis and gluconeogenesis, the citric acid cycle, β-alanine metabolism, inositol phosphate metabolism, propanoate metabolism, and two-component system (TCS). The metabolism of xanthine and hypoxanthine were discovered to be unique to C. cellulans.

== Diversity ==
=== Genome evolution ===
As of 2017, The National Center for Biotechnology Information (NCBI) contains 17 assembled genomes for Cellulosmicrobium cellulans. The median GC content for this species is 74.3771%, with a median total length of 4.32208 Mb and a median protein count of 3871.

A recent breakthrough for the C. cellulans genome was discovered after researching certain carbohydrate lysing enzymes found in strain MP1, an isolate found in termite gut symbionts. Three of the 17 assembled genomes were selected for comparison: J36, LMG16121, and ZKA 48. Clusters of Orthologous Genes (COGs) were compared between the three known genomes of C. cellulans and the MP1 strain and demonstrated many similarities between the genomes. A strong correlation was revealed between strain LMG16121 and MP1, implying that the two genomes formed a monophyletic clade.

=== Phylogeny ===
Relatively little research has been conducted on the genus Cellulosmicrobium, contributing minimal data to the NCBI database. However, 16S rRNA gene sequences provided by GenBank made possible a phylogenetic tree to determine the relationships between each species. As of 2021, there are only 6 other known species that have been discovered within the genus Cellulosmicrobium: C. cellulans, C. aquatile, C. arenosum, C. funkei, C.marium, C. terreum, and C. varabile. Some strains of these species, namely C. cellulans and C. terreum, were isolated from samples of soil, whereas the C. funkei species was isolated from human blood.

== Disease ==
=== Infection ===
C. cellulans infections are rare and the organism is considered an opportunistic pathogen. C. cellulans usually only affects immunocompromised individuals or foreign body carriers that penetrate the body via catheters, plant thorns/needles, etc. Fewer than 100 people have been infected by this pathogen and this pathogen has shown a variety in severity of symptoms. Those with pre-existing conditions who contract C. cellulans experience more severe disease; healthy individuals typically present with mild symptoms. In these cases, C. cellulans causes local inflammation where the affected sites become painful, swollen, and tender.

In one case study, a 52-year-old woman developed endocarditis and intracranial infarction due to C. cellulans infection.

== Applications ==
=== Modern-day advances ===
The enzymatic properties of C. cellulans demonstrate great biotechnological and industrial potential. The endo-β-1,3-glucanase is a yeast cell wall lysing enzyme that has been utilized to study yeast and fungal cell walls. Derivatives of this enzyme have been synthesized commercially to isolate yeast DNA, prepare yeast protoplasts, and catalyze biological processes. C. cellulans is also a known producer of Levan polysaccharide, which is a polysaccharide used in food, medicinal, and cosmetic industries.
