= Isoptericola chiayiensis =

Scientific classification
- Domain: Bacteria
- Kingdom: Bacillati
- Phylum: Actinomycetota
- Class: Actinomycetes
- Order: Micrococcales
- Family: Promicromonosporaceae
- Genus: Isoptericola
- Species: I. chiayiensis

Binomial name
- Isoptericola chiayiensis Tseng et al. 2011

Type strain
- 06182M-1; BCRC 16888; FIRDI 8 JCM 18063; KCTC 19740; LMG 25314

Species of bacterium

Isoptericola chiayiensis is a bacterium from the genus Isoptericola which has been isolated from mangrove soil from Chiayi County, Taiwan.
