= Myceligenerans halotolerans =

Scientific classification
- Domain: Bacteria
- Kingdom: Bacillati
- Phylum: Actinomycetota
- Class: Actinomycetes
- Order: Micrococcales
- Family: Promicromonosporaceae
- Genus: Myceligenerans
- Species: M. halotolerans

Binomial name
- Myceligenerans halotolerans Wang et al. 2011

Type strain
- CCTCC AA 208063; DSM 21949; XJEEM 11063

Species of bacterium

Myceligenerans halotolerans is a halotolerant bacterium from the genus Myceligenerans which has been isolated from a salt lake in Xinjiang province, China.
