= Myceligenerans xiligouense =

Scientific classification
- Domain: Bacteria
- Kingdom: Bacillati
- Phylum: Actinomycetota
- Class: Actinomycetes
- Order: Micrococcales
- Family: Promicromonosporaceae
- Genus: Myceligenerans
- Species: M. xiligouense

Binomial name
- Myceligenerans xiligouense Cui et al. 2004

Type strain
- CGMCC 1.3458; Cui XLG910.2; DSM 15700; HKI 0336; JCM 14112; VTT E-042611; XLG9A10.2

Species of bacterium

Myceligenerans xiligouense is a bacterium from the genus Myceligenerans which has been isolated from mud of Xiligou lake, Xiligou, Qinghai Province, China.
