= Myceligenerans cantabricum =

Scientific classification
- Domain: Bacteria
- Kingdom: Bacillati
- Phylum: Actinomycetota
- Class: Actinomycetes
- Order: Micrococcales
- Family: Promicromonosporaceae
- Genus: Myceligenerans
- Species: M. cantabricum

Binomial name
- Myceligenerans cantabricum Sarmiento-Vizcaíno et al. 2015

Type strain
- CECT 8512; DSM 28392; M-201

Species of bacterium

Myceligenerans cantabricum is a barotolerant bacterium from the genus Myceligenerans which has been isolated from deep cold-water from the Cantabrian Sea near Spain.
