= Krasilnikoviella flava =

Scientific classification
- Domain: Bacteria
- Kingdom: Bacillati
- Phylum: Actinomycetota
- Class: Actinomycetes
- Order: Micrococcales
- Family: Promicromonosporaceae
- Genus: Krasilnikoviella
- Species: K. flava

Binomial name
- Krasilnikoviella flava (Jiang et al. 2009) Nishijima et al. 2017

Type strain
- CC 0387; CCTCC AA 208024; DSM 21481; JCM 16551

Species of bacterium

Krasilnikoviella flava is a Gram-positive and non-spore-forming bacterium from the genus Krasilnikoviella which has been isolated from sediments from the Baltic Sea at the Kiel Bay in Germany.
