= Isoptericola cucumis =

Scientific classification
- Domain: Bacteria
- Kingdom: Bacillati
- Phylum: Actinomycetota
- Class: Actinomycetes
- Order: Micrococcales
- Family: Promicromonosporaceae
- Genus: Isoptericola
- Species: I. cucumis

Binomial name
- Isoptericola cucumis Kämpfer et al. 2016

Type strain
- CCM 8653; LMG 29223; AP-38

Species of bacterium

Isoptericola cucumis is a Gram-positive and aerobic bacterium from the genus Isoptericola which has been isolated from a cucumber (Cucumis sativus) in Auburn, Alabama, in the United States.
