= Isoptericola nanjingensis =

Scientific classification
- Domain: Bacteria
- Kingdom: Bacillati
- Phylum: Actinomycetota
- Class: Actinomycetes
- Order: Micrococcales
- Family: Promicromonosporaceae
- Genus: Isoptericola
- Species: I. nanjingensis

Binomial name
- Isoptericola nanjingensis Huang et al. 2012

Type strain
- CCTCC AB 2011005; DSM 24300; H17

Species of bacterium

Isoptericola nanjingensis is a Gram-positive bacterium from the genus Isoptericola which has been isolated from soil from Nanjing, China.
