= Isoptericola salitolerans =

Scientific classification
- Domain: Bacteria
- Kingdom: Bacillati
- Phylum: Actinomycetota
- Class: Actinomycetes
- Order: Micrococcales
- Family: Promicromonosporaceae
- Genus: Isoptericola
- Species: I. salitolerans

Binomial name
- Isoptericola salitolerans Guan et al. 2013

Type strain
- JCM 15901; KCTC 19617; TRM F109

Species of bacterium

"Isoptericola salitolerans" is a halotolerant, Gram-positive, aerobic and non-motile bacterium from the genus Isoptericola which has been isolated from a salt lake in China.
