= Isoptericola jiangsuensis =

Scientific classification
- Domain: Bacteria
- Kingdom: Bacillati
- Phylum: Actinomycetota
- Class: Actinomycetes
- Order: Micrococcales
- Family: Promicromonosporaceae
- Genus: Isoptericola
- Species: I. jiangsuensis

Binomial name
- Isoptericola jiangsuensis Wu et al. 2010

Type strain
- CCTCC AB208287; CLG; DSM 21863; JCM 17812

Species of bacterium

Isoptericola jiangsuensis is a Gram-positive, chitin-degrading and non-motile bacterium from the genus Isoptericola which has been isolated from beach soil near Lianyungang, China.
