= Promicromonospora umidemergens =

Scientific classification
- Domain: Bacteria
- Kingdom: Bacillati
- Phylum: Actinomycetota
- Class: Actinomycetes
- Order: Micrococcales
- Family: Promicromonosporaceae
- Genus: Promicromonospora
- Species: P. umidemergens

Binomial name
- Promicromonospora umidemergens Martin et al. 2010

Type strain
- 09-Be-007; CCM 7634; DSM 22081; JCM 17975

Species of bacterium

Promicromonospora umidemergens is a Gram-positive bacterium from the genus Promicromonospora which has been isolated from indoor wall material in Berlin, Germany.
