= Xylanimonas pachnodae =

Scientific classification
- Domain: Bacteria
- Kingdom: Bacillati
- Phylum: Actinomycetota
- Class: Actinomycetes
- Order: Micrococcales
- Family: Promicromonosporaceae
- Genus: Xylanimonas
- Species: X. pachnodae

Binomial name
- Xylanimonas pachnodae (Cazemier et al. 2004) Heo et al. 2020

Type strain
- DSM 12657; JCM 13526; NCCB 100020; VPCX2

Synonyms
- "Cellulomonas pachnodae" Cazemier et al. 1999; Promicromonospora pachnodae Cazemier et al. 2004; Xylanimicrobium pachnodae (Cazemier et al. 2004) Stackebrandt and Schumann 2004

Species of bacterium

Xylanimonas pachnodae is a bacterium from the genus Xylanimonas which has been isolated from the hindgut of the larvae of Pachnoda marginata in the Netherlands.
