= Promicromonospora thailandica =

Scientific classification
- Domain: Bacteria
- Kingdom: Bacillati
- Phylum: Actinomycetota
- Class: Actinomycetes
- Order: Micrococcales
- Family: Promicromonosporaceae
- Genus: Promicromonospora
- Species: P. thailandica

Binomial name
- Promicromonospora thailandica Thawai and Kudo 2012

Type strain
- BCC 41922; JCM 17130; S7F-02

Species of bacterium

Promicromonospora thailandica is a bacterium from the genus Promicromonospora which has been isolated from marine sediments from the Andaman Sea in Thailand.
