= Krasilnikoviella muralis =

Scientific classification
- Domain: Bacteria
- Kingdom: Bacillati
- Phylum: Actinomycetota
- Class: Actinomycetes
- Order: Micrococcales
- Family: Promicromonosporaceae
- Genus: Krasilnikoviella
- Species: K. muralis

Binomial name
- Krasilnikoviella muralis Nishijima et al. 2017

Type strain
- JCM 28789; NCIMB 15040; T6220-5-2b

Species of bacterium

Krasilnikoviella muralis is a Gram-positive and facultatively anaerobic bacterium from the genus Krasilnikoviella.
