= Cellulosimicrobium terreum =

Scientific classification
- Domain: Bacteria
- Kingdom: Bacillati
- Phylum: Actinomycetota
- Class: Actinomycetes
- Order: Micrococcales
- Family: Promicromonosporaceae
- Genus: Cellulosimicrobium
- Species: C. terreum

Binomial name
- Cellulosimicrobium terreum Yoon et al. 2007

Type strain
- DS-61; DSM 18665; JCM 15619; KCTC 19206

Species of bacterium

Cellulosimicrobium terreum is a Gram-positive, rod-shaped and non-motile bacterium from the genus Cellulosimicrobium which has been isolated from soil from Dokdo, Korea.
