= Isoptericola dokdonensis =

Scientific classification
- Domain: Bacteria
- Kingdom: Bacillati
- Phylum: Actinomycetota
- Class: Actinomycetes
- Order: Micrococcales
- Family: Promicromonosporaceae
- Genus: Isoptericola
- Species: I. dokdonensis

Binomial name
- Isoptericola dokdonensis Yoon et al. 2006

Type strain
- CIP 108921; JCM 15137; KCTC 19128; DS-3

Species of bacterium

Isoptericola dokdonensis is a Gram-positive and non-motile bacterium from the genus Isoptericola which has been isolated from soil in Dokdo, Korea.
