= Promicromonospora sukumoe =

Scientific classification
- Domain: Bacteria
- Kingdom: Bacillati
- Phylum: Actinomycetota
- Class: Actinomycetes
- Order: Micrococcales
- Family: Promicromonosporaceae
- Genus: Promicromonospora
- Species: P. sukumoe

Binomial name
- Promicromonospora sukumoe Takahashi et al. 1988

Type strain
- DSM 44121; IFO 14650; JCM 6845; NBRC 14650; SK-2049; VKM Ac-1966

Species of bacterium

Promicromonospora sukumoe is a bacterium from the genus Promicromonospora which has been isolated from soil from Sukumo, Japan.
