= Promicromonospora citrea =

Scientific classification
- Domain: Bacteria
- Kingdom: Bacillati
- Phylum: Actinomycetota
- Class: Actinomycetes
- Order: Micrococcales
- Family: Promicromonosporaceae
- Genus: Promicromonospora
- Species: P. citrea

Binomial name
- Promicromonospora citrea Krassilnikov et al. 1961 (Approved Lists 1980)

Type strain
- AMMRL 88.01; ATCC 15908; CGMCC 4.1485; DSM 43110; IFM 1286; IFO 12397; IMET 7267; IMSNU 20110; INMI 18; JCM 3051; KCC A-0051; KCTC 9069; LMG 4076; MTCC 271; NBIMCC 1485; NBRC 12397; NCIB 12149; NCIMB 12149; NRRL B-3485; RIA 562; VKM Ac-665

Species of bacterium

Promicromonospora citrea is a bacterium from the genus Promicromonospora which has been isolated from garden soil.
