= Promicromonospora iranensis =

Scientific classification
- Domain: Bacteria
- Kingdom: Bacillati
- Phylum: Actinomycetota
- Class: Actinomycetes
- Order: Micrococcales
- Family: Promicromonosporaceae
- Genus: Promicromonospora
- Species: P. iranensis

Binomial name
- Promicromonospora iranensis Mohammadipanah et al. 2014

Type strain
- CCUG 63022; DSM 45554; HM 792; UTMC00792

Species of bacterium

Promicromonospora iranensis is a bacterium from the genus Promicromonospora which has been isolated from rhizospheric soil in the Fars province, Iran.
