= Isoptericola variabilis =

Scientific classification
- Domain: Bacteria
- Kingdom: Bacillati
- Phylum: Actinomycetota
- Class: Actinomycetes
- Order: Micrococcales
- Family: Promicromonosporaceae
- Genus: Isoptericola
- Species: I. variabilis

Binomial name
- Isoptericola variabilis (Bakalidou et al. 2002) Stackebrandt et al. 2004

Type strain
- ATCC BAA-303; CIP 109082; DSM 10177; JCM 11754; KCTC 9985; MX5; NBRC 104115

Synonyms
- "Cellulomonas variformis" Priya et al. 2012; Cellulosimicrobium variabile Bakalidou et al. 2002

Species of bacterium

Isoptericola variabilis is a facultative anaerobic and nitrile-hydrolysing bacterium from the genus Isoptericola which has been isolated from the hindgut of the termite Mastotermes darwiniensis in Germany.
