= Isoptericola rhizophila =

Scientific classification
- Domain: Bacteria
- Kingdom: Bacillati
- Phylum: Actinomycetota
- Class: Actinomycetes
- Order: Micrococcales
- Family: Promicromonosporaceae
- Genus: Isoptericola
- Species: I. rhizophila

Binomial name
- Isoptericola rhizophila Kaur et al. 2014

Type strain
- BKS 3-46; JCM 19252; MTCC 11080

Species of bacterium

"Isoptericola rhizophila" is a Gram-positive bacterium from the genus of Isoptericola which has been isolated from rhizospheric soil from the tree Ficus benghalensis from the Bhitarkanika mangrove forest in India.
