= Isoptericola halalbus =

Scientific classification
- Domain: Bacteria
- Kingdom: Bacillati
- Phylum: Actinomycetota
- Class: Actinomycetes
- Order: Micrococcales
- Family: Promicromonosporaceae
- Genus: Isoptericola
- Species: I. halalbus

Binomial name
- Isoptericola halalbus Ming et al. 2020

Type strain
- CFH 91151; DSM 105976; KCTC 49061

Species of bacterium

Isoptericola halalbus is a halotolerant and Gram-positive bacterium from the genus Isoptericola which has been isolated from sediments from a saline lake in Yuncheng, China.
