= Isoptericola =

Scientific classification
- Domain: Bacteria
- Kingdom: Bacillati
- Phylum: Actinomycetota
- Class: Actinomycetes
- Order: Micrococcales
- Family: Promicromonosporaceae
- Genus: Isoptericola; Stackebrandt et al. 2004

Type species
- Isoptericola variabilis (Bakalidou et al. 2002) Stackebrandt et al. 2004

Species
- I. chiayiensis Tseng et al. 2011; I. cucumis Kämpfer et al. 2016; I. dokdonensis Yoon et al. 2006; I. halalbus Ming et al. 2020; I. halotolerans Zhang et al. 2005; I. hypogeus Groth et al. 2005; I. jiangsuensis Wu et al. 2010; I. nanjingensis Huang et al. 2012; "I. rhizophila" Kaur et al. 2014; "I. salitolerans" Guan et al. 2013; "I. sediminis" Kumar et al. 2021; I. variabilis (Bakalidou et al. 2002) Stackebrandt et al. 2004

Genus of bacteria

Isoptericola is a Gram-positive and rod-shaped bacterial genus from the family Promicromonosporaceae.
