= Antribacter gilvus =

Scientific classification
- Domain: Bacteria
- Kingdom: Bacillati
- Phylum: Actinomycetota
- Class: Actinomycetes
- Order: Micrococcales
- Family: Promicromonosporaceae
- Genus: Antribacter; Zhang et al. 2019
- Species: A. gilvus

Binomial name
- Antribacter gilvus Zhang et al. 2019

Type strain
- CFH 30434; CGMCC 1.13856; KCTC 49093

Genus of bacteria

Antribacter gilvus is a Gram-positive, aerobic and non-motile species from the family Promicromonosporaceae.
