= Cellulosimicrobium =

Scientific classification
- Domain: Bacteria
- Kingdom: Bacillati
- Phylum: Actinomycetota
- Class: Actinomycetes
- Order: Micrococcales
- Family: Promicromonosporaceae
- Genus: Cellulosimicrobium; Schumann et al. 2001

Type species
- Cellulosimicrobium cellulans (Metcalfe and Brown 1957) Schumann et al. 2001

Species
- "C. arenosum" Oh et al. 2018; C. cellulans (Metcalfe and Brown 1957) Schumann et al. 2001; C. composti Hu et al. 2021; C. fucosivorans Aviles and Kyndt 2021; C. funkei Brown et al. 2006; C. marinum Hamada et al. 2016; C. protaetiae Le Han et al. 2022; C. terreum Yoon et al. 2007

Genus of bacteria

Cellulosimicrobium is a Gram-positive bacterial genus from the family Promicromonosporaceae. Cellulosimicrobium bacteria can cause infections in humans. This genus has been found to be part of the salivary microbiome.
