= Krasilnikoviella =

Scientific classification
- Domain: Bacteria
- Kingdom: Bacillati
- Phylum: Actinomycetota
- Class: Actinomycetes
- Order: Micrococcales
- Family: Promicromonosporaceae
- Genus: Krasilnikoviella; Nishijima et al. 2017

Type species
- Krasilnikoviella muralis Nishijima et al. 2017

Species
- K. flava (Jiang et al. 2009) Nishijima et al. 2017; K. muralis Nishijima et al. 2017

Genus of bacteria

Krasilnikoviella is a genus from the family Promicromonosporaceae.
