= Xylanimonas =

Scientific classification
- Domain: Bacteria
- Kingdom: Bacillati
- Phylum: Actinomycetota
- Class: Actinomycetes
- Order: Micrococcales
- Family: Promicromonosporaceae
- Genus: Xylanimonas; Rivas et al. 2003

Type species
- Xylanimonas cellulosilytica Rivas et al. 2003

Species
- X. allomyrinae Heo et al. 2020; X. cellulosilytica Rivas et al. 2003; "X. oleitrophica" Nagkirti et al. 2021; X. pachnodae (Cazemier et al. 2004) Heo et al. 2020; "X. protaetiae" Heo et al. 2020; X. ulmi (Rivas et al. 2004) Heo et al. 2020

Synonyms
- Xylanimicrobium Stackebrandt and Schumann 2004; Xylanibacterium Rivas et al. 2004

Genus of bacteria

Xylanimonas is a Gram-positive and non-spore-forming bacterial genus from the family Promicromonosporaceae.
