= Promicromonospora =

Scientific classification
- Domain: Bacteria
- Kingdom: Bacillati
- Phylum: Actinomycetota
- Class: Actinomycetes
- Order: Micrococcales
- Family: Promicromonosporaceae
- Genus: Promicromonospora; Krasil'nikov et al. 1961

Type species
- Promicromonospora citrea Krassilnikov et al. 1961 (Approved Lists 1980)

Species
- P. aerolata Busse et al. 2003; P. alba Guo et al. 2016; P. callitridis Kaewkla and Franco 2017; P. citrea Krassilnikov et al. 1961 (Approved Lists 1980); P. endophytica Kaewkla and Franco 2012; P. iranensis Mohammadipanah et al. 2014; P. kermanensis Mohammadipanah et al. 2017; P. kroppenstedtii Alonso-Vega et al. 2008; "P. panici" Guesmi et al. 2021; P. soli Zheng et al. 2017; P. sukumoe Takahashi et al. 1988; P. thailandica Thawai and Kudo 2012; P. umidemergens Martin et al. 2010; P. vindobonensis Busse et al. 2003; "P. viridis" Jin et al. 2018; P. xylanilytica Qin et al. 2012

Genus of bacteria

Promicromonospora is a Gram-positive and aerobic bacterial genus from the family Promicromonosporaceae.
