= Myceligenerans =

Scientific classification
- Domain: Bacteria
- Kingdom: Bacillati
- Phylum: Actinomycetota
- Class: Actinomycetes
- Order: Micrococcales
- Family: Promicromonosporaceae
- Genus: Myceligenerans; Cui et al. 2004

Type species
- Myceligenerans xiligouense Cui et al. 2004

Species
- M. cantabricum Sarmiento-Vizcaíno et al. 2015; M. crystallogenes Groth et al. 2006; M. halotolerans Wang et al. 2011; "M. indicum" Asha and Bhadury 2021; "M. salitolerans" Guan et al. 2013; M. xiligouense Cui et al. 2004

Genus of bacteria

Myceligenerans is a Gram-positive, spore-forming and mycelium-forming bacterial genus from the family of Promicromonosporaceae.
