= Casal Rotondo =

Ancient tomb on the Appian Way outside Rome, Italy

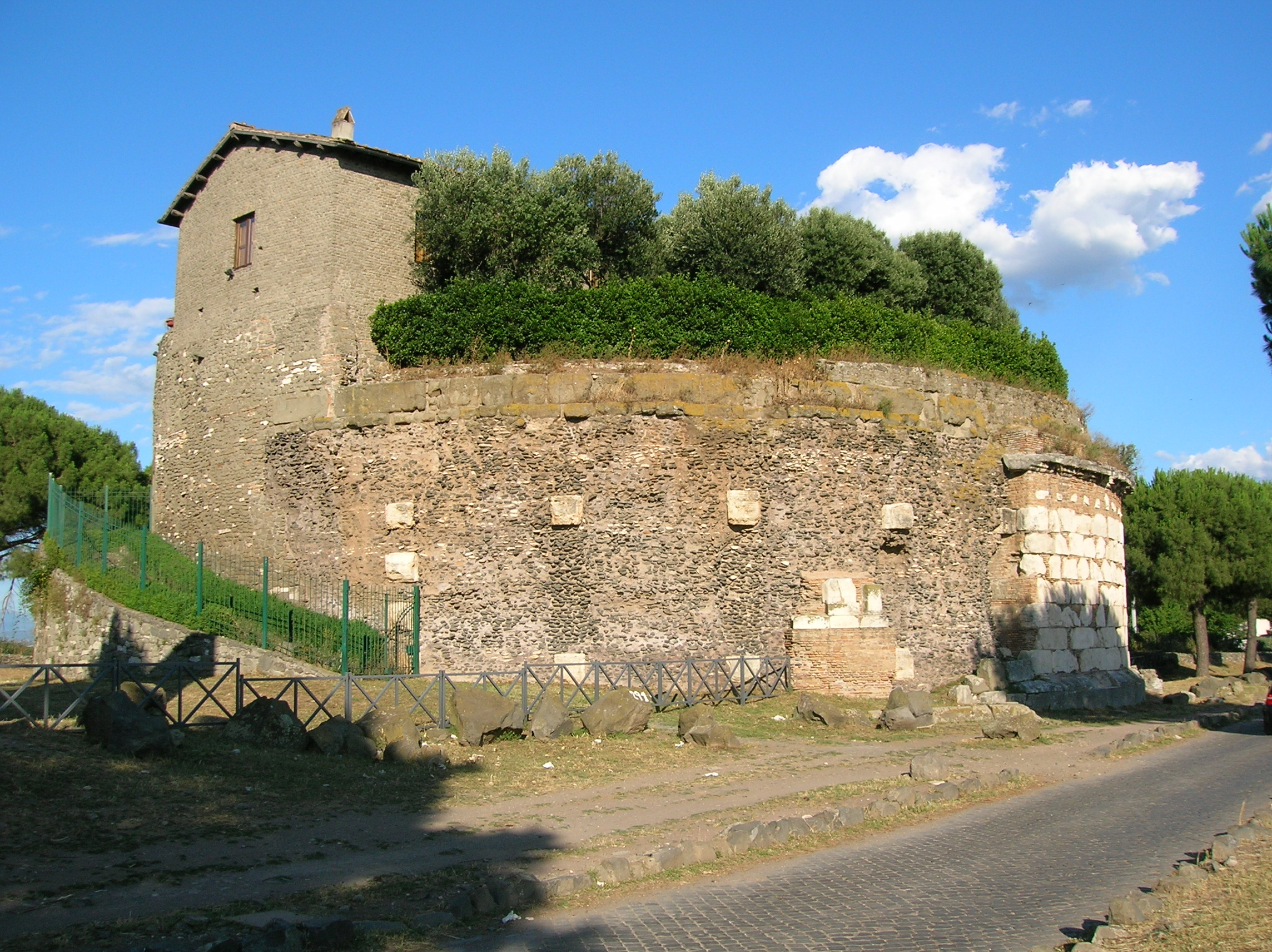
- Casal Rotondo
- Click on the map for a fullscreen view
- 41.821°N 12.556°E

Casal Rotondo is the largest surviving circular ancient Roman mausoleum on the Appian Way, to the southeast of Rome, Italy. A small medieval farmhouse was constructed atop the remains of the tomb.

== History ==
The mausoleum was constructed c. 30 BCE at approximately the sixth mile of the Appian Way, a stretch of road that was densely packed with tombs in antiquity. It is a large circular structure with a diameter of 27 metres (89 ft) that originally featured a conical roof, frieze ornamentation, and seating encircling its base.

In the mid-18th century, the Italian archaeologist Luigi Canina deduced from an epigraphic fragment uncovered nearby, bearing the inscription "COTTA," that the monument had been built by Marcus Aurelius Cotta Maximus Messalinus for his father Marcus Valerius Messalla Corvinus. However, contemporary archaeologists dispute this claim and believe this inscription to originate from a nearby smaller tomb. Canina constructed a large brick wall near the mausoleum to display this inscription alongside other sculptural fragments found in the vicinity. The name of the structure refers to the medieval farmhouse (Italian: casale) built atop the mausoleum by the Savelli family which served as a watchtower along the Appian Way.

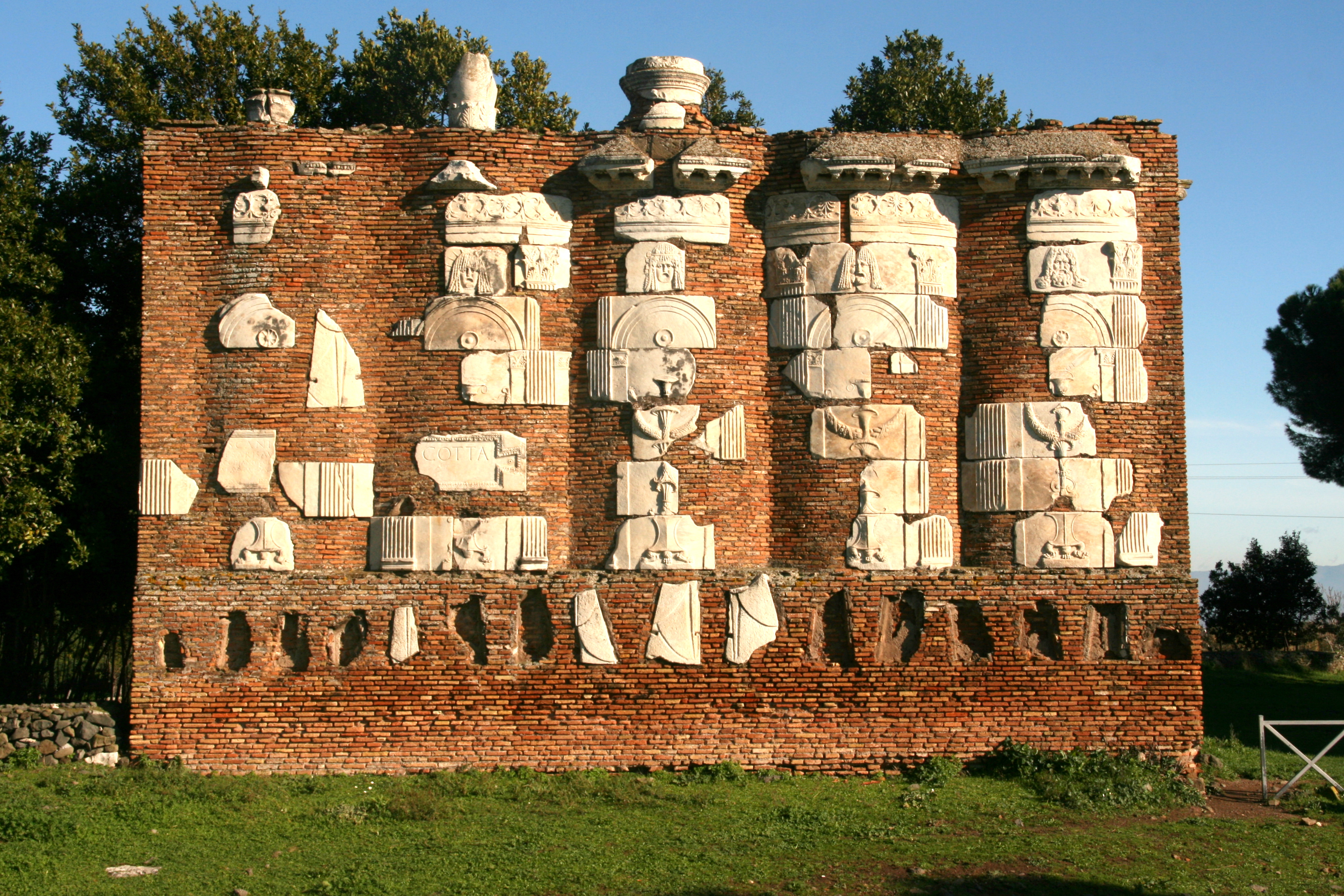
Canina's wall of fragments

== See also ==
- List of ancient sites in Rome

Preceded by Trajan's Market	Landmarks of Rome; Casal Rotondo	Succeeded by Catacombs of Domitilla
