= Black Irish Band =

American folk music musical group

- Origin: Sonora, California, United States
- Genres: Americana
- Years active: 1989–2020

The Black Irish Band writes, produces, and performs historically-accurate original and traditional songs and ballads. Over the last three decades, the band has delivered 27 albums, more than 100 original songs, and 199 videos. The Black Irish Band first gained national attention after it performed on “CBS This Morning" with Paula Zahn and Harry Smith in the late 90s.

== History ==
=== 1989-1999 ===
In 1989, founding members Patrick Michael Karnahan and Richard Restivo met during the filming of the motion picture "Back to the Future Part III." The pair was selected to be members of the movie band. Musician Steve McArthur had a speaking role.

In 1991, the band released its first album, The Forgotten Fields of America. It was followed by Whalers Cove (1992), Hooligans Once Again (1993), Oceans Away Mountains Apart (1994), Underneath the Far Western Sky (1995), The Harbinger Has Passed (1996), Hooligans United (1997), and The Forgotten West (1998). In 1999, the band released two albums: Hear the Lonesome Whistle Blow (1999) and The Day the Earth Shook (1999). The band appeared on “CBS This Morning" with Paula Zahn and Harry Smith.

=== 2000-2010 ===
In 2004, guitarist Ken Darby was killed when his motorcycle was struck by a pick-up truck. He was 47 years old.

In 2005, the Black Irish Band performed at the Smithsonian Institution and John F. Kennedy Center for the Performing Arts, in Washington, D.C., as a part of the Smithsonian Folklife Festival. The festival showcased the occupational traditions of the USDA Forest Service during its 100th anniversary celebration. In 2013 Wild Fire Today highlighted the band's dedication and commitment to wildland firefighters in a feature article. As of July 2018, the band had recorded ten original songs in support of firefighters.

From 2000-2010, the band released nine albums. Into the Arms of the Sea (2000), American Landscapes (2004), From the Forest (2005), Long Way to Tipperary (2006), Into the Fire, featuring Michael Martin Murphey (2007), Lonesome Whistle (2008), 28 Black Irish Favorites (2008), Twenty, Back in Black Irish (2009) and Sonora Farewell (2010).

=== 2011-Present ===
The Black Irish Band released two albums in 2011. They were: California Story (2011) and Ireland's Song (2011). From 2012 to the present, they released five albums: Dark Ocean (2012), This Summer (2013), American Legends (2014), Give Us All Yer Whiskey (2016) and Warriors of the West (2018).

On July 4, 2012, the Colorado Springs Symphony featured the band's original song “South Canyon 1994” in a televised concert in support of fire relief for the victims of the 2012 Waldo Canyon Fire. More than three million people watched the performance via live television broadcast. In August 2012, the “Ballad of Teddy Roosevelt” was featured in a promotional online video by the Washington Post to get Washington National fans to vote for a winner in RFK Stadium's “The Presidents’ Race.” In April 2013, Stanford University published an article, "Men of Iron," about Chinese Americans that built the Central Pacific Railroad. The article references the Black Irish Band's song of the same name. In 2015, maritime historian, author and adventurer Roy Stokes attributed his decision to write the book "Between the Tides: Shipwrecks of the Irish Coast," to the song "The Wreck of the Pomona. On August 7, 2018, Film True Productions debuted the documentary "Keepers of the Light" about the Gay Head Lighthouse, on National Lighthouse Day, at the Martha's Vineyard Film Center. The movie features the Black Irish Band's original song "Spanish Ladies."

In 2017, original band member Richard Restivo died from a chronic lung disease. He was 64.

In 2019, the Band released the CD "Promontory Summit" in honor of the 150th anniversary of the Golden Spike and the building of the Transcontinental Railroad. The Band was selected by the Utah Committee/ National Park Service to perform at its three-day Spike 150 celebration at the Golden Spike National Historical Park, in Corinne, Utah.

== Musical style ==
The Black Irish Band's focus is on storytelling historically-accurate songs. In addition, the band has a large complement of Irish, Scottish, Italian, and American folk music plus ethnic tunes and traditional western ballads. Its mix also includes maritime and railroad music. Founding member Patrick Michael Karnahan has written more than 100 of the band's original songs.

== Band members ==
=== Current members ===
- Patrick Michael Karnahan - Banjo, melodeon, concertina, guitar, trumpet, French horn, vocals
- Michael Mullen - Fiddle, guitar, accordion, mandola, piano, vocals
- James Dean Nelson - Long Neck Banjo, Vocals
- Erich Quinn - Bass guitar
- Tobin Denton - Drums
- Micha Dunston- Whistle & Irish Drum

=== Former members ===
- Richard "Rick" Restivo (October 3, 1952 – April 21, 2017) - Bass, bass guitar
- Ken Darby (February 14, 1957 - June 22, 2004) - Guitar, Octave mandolin
- Chris Miller - (March 2, 1952 - living) Guitar, flute, vocals

=== Guest musicians and singers ===
- Michael Martin Murphey
- Mary Youngblood
- Joe Craven
- Mic Gillette Tower of Power
- Val Shadow-Hawk
- Utah Phillips

== Discography ==
- The Forgotten Fields of America (1991)
- Whalers Cove (1992)
- Hooligans Once Again (1993)
- Oceans Away Mountains Apart (1994)
- Underneath the Far Western Sky (1995)
- The Harbinger Has Passed (1996)
- Hooligans United (1997)
- The Forgotten West (1998)
- Hear the Lonesome Whistle Blow (1999)
- The Day the Earth Shook (1999)
- Into the Arms of the Sea (2000)
- American Landscapes (2004)
- From the Forest (2005)
- Long Way to Tipperary (2006)
- Into the Fire (2007)
- Lonesome Whistle (2008)
- 28 Black Irish Favorites (2008)
- Twenty, Back in Black Irish (2009)
- Sonora Farewell (2010)
- California Story (2011)
- Ireland's Song (2011)
- Dark Ocean (2012)
- This Summer (2013)
- American Legends (2014)
- Give Us All Yer Whiskey (2016)
- Warriors of the West (2018)
- Promontory Summit (2019)
