= Vergilius Chapel =

Underground crypt in Vienna, Austria

Coordinates: 48°12′30″N 16°22′20″E

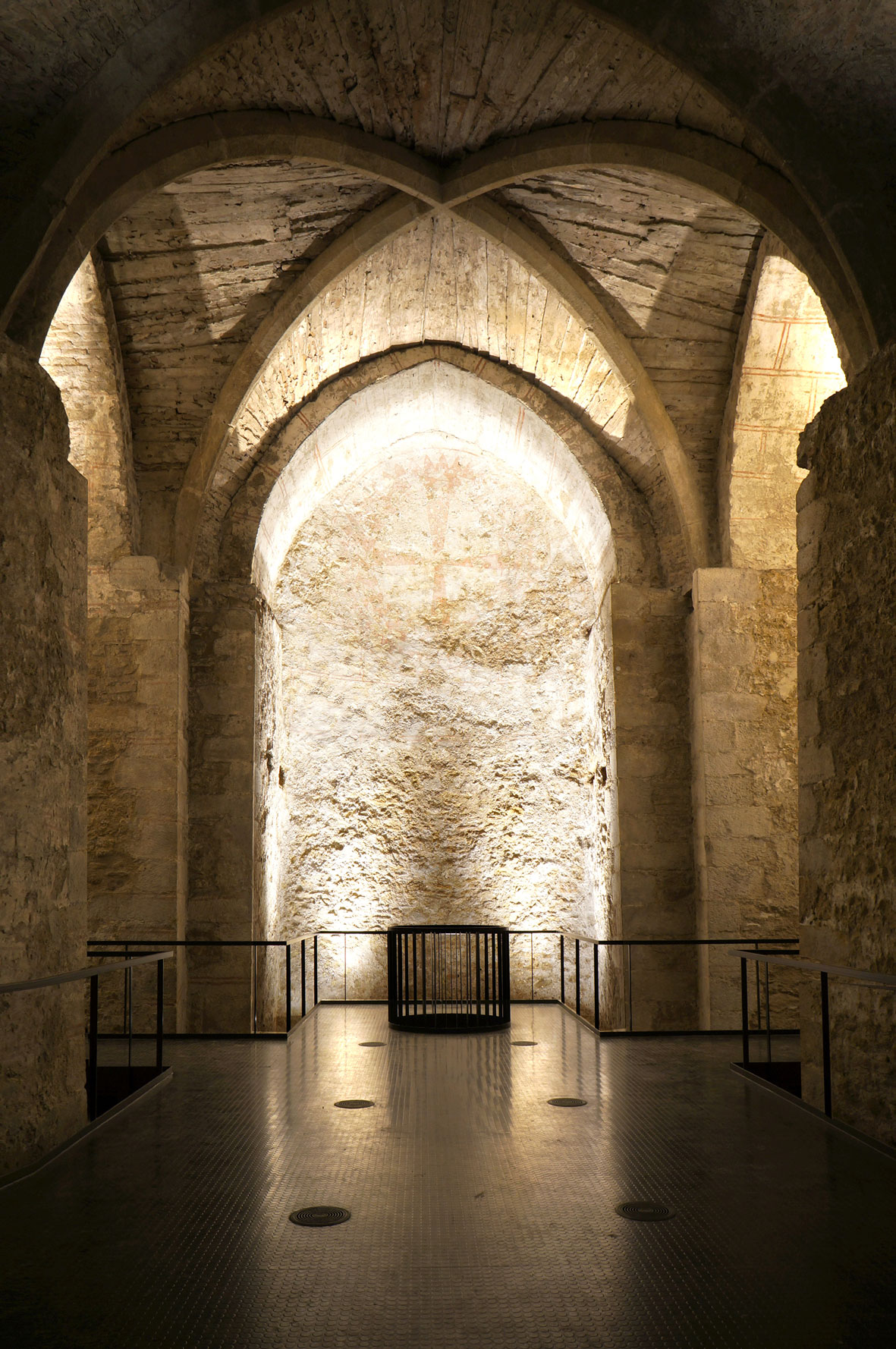
The underground Virgilius Chapel, with painted Byzantine cross

The Vergilius Chapel (German: Virgilkapelle) is an underground crypt next to the Stephansdom in Vienna. It is rectangular in form (approximately 6 meters by 10), with six niches. Today, it lies approximately 12 meters beneath the Stephansplatz.

== History ==
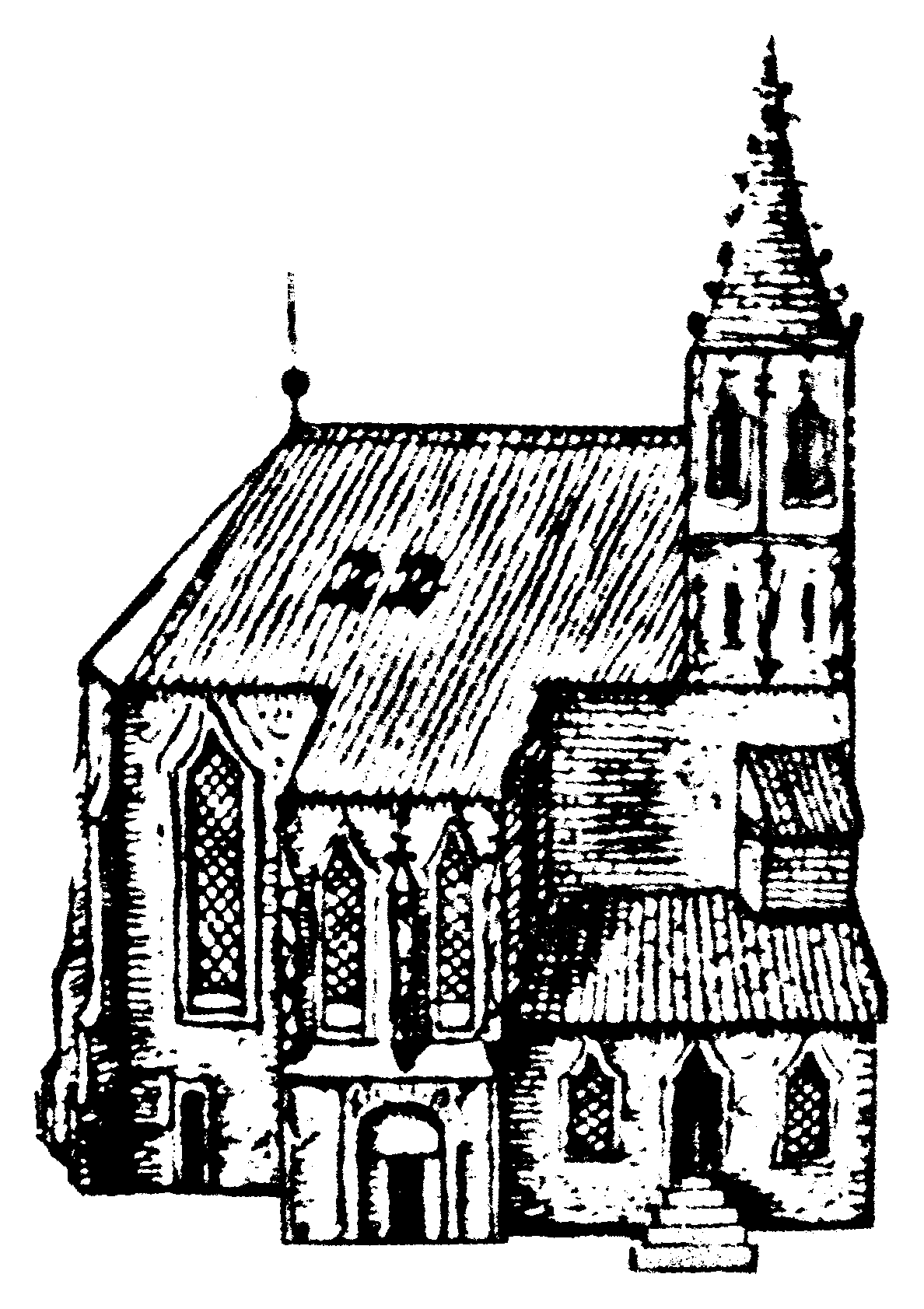
Sketch of the above-ground Magdalene Chapel, 1609

The history of the chapel is not entirely clear. The architecture can be dated to the early 13th century. At this time, Frederick the Warlike (1230–1246), the last Duke of the House of Babenberg, was the ruler of Vienna. It has been hypothesized that the Duke, who would have liked to have established Vienna as an episcopal see, had the crypt built for St. Coloman of Stockerau, who was to be the patron of the new diocese. However, the chronicles do not mention the chapel, which has given rise to the speculation that it is the remnant of a failed project.

In the year 1307, a burial chapel of the Viennese family Chrannest is mentioned. The chapel was said to have multiple altars, one of which was dedicated to St. Vergilius of Salzburg.

In the Middle Ages, the Stephansdom was encircled by a large cemetery. A single small chapel, dedicated to St. Mary Magdalene (the Magdalenskapelle or Magdalene Chapel), existed for consecrations and requiem masses. The Virgilius Chapel lay directly underneath this chapel, and a vertical shaft connected the two buildings.

In 1782, the cemetery around the Stephansdom was closed. The Magdalene Chapel was destroyed by fire in 1781 and was not rebuilt (presumably as, without a cemetery, there was no need for a funeral chapel). The Virgilius Chapel was filled with rubble and faded into obscurity.

In 1973 the chapel was rediscovered during construction of the Vienna U-Bahn. Today there is a mosaic on the Stephansplatz showing the outlines of the Virgilius Chapel. The chapel itself has survived with hardly any damage and provides the visitor with an excellent glance into the world of the Middle Ages.

== Location ==
The Virgilius Chapel may be entered directly from the Stephansplatz U-Bahn Station. It is possible to look into the chapel from above. A collection of historical ceramics has been installed at the entrance to the chapel itself.
