= Catacombs of Domitilla =

Catacomb in Rome, Italy

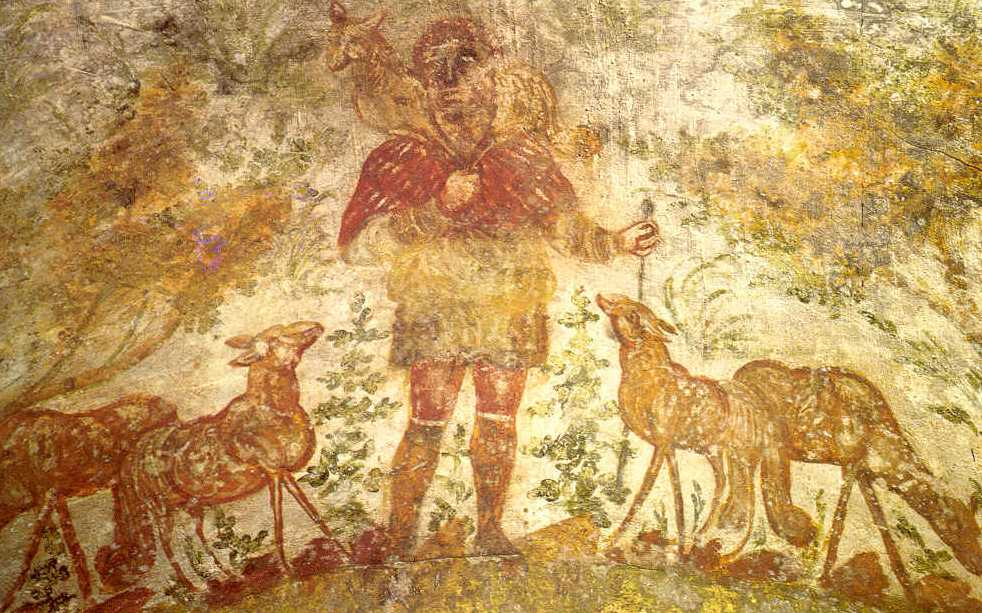
- Good Shepherd, wall painting
- Interactive map of Catacombs of Domitilla
- 41°51′32″N 12°30′20″E

The Catacombs of Domitilla are an underground Christian cemetery named after the Domitilla family that had initially ordered them to be dug. Located in Rome, Italy, are the human-made subterranean passageways used for cemeteries and religious practice. They are among the largest catacombs in Rome, spreading out 17 km, largely along the ancient Via Ardeatine, laid out on four levels, and housing approximately 15,000 bodies underground. The Catacombs of Domitilla are the only catacombs in Rome that have an underground basilica and are one of only five Roman catacombs open to the public. Constructed during the second and third centuries, this labyrinth of underground passages contains frescoes and a wealth of Christian iconography while also presenting masterful engineering skills and innovative architectural techniques.

== Early history ==
Consisting of a variably soft stone called tufa, a form of limestone that is porous, the terrain around Rome was well-suited for building catacombs. The volcanic nature of the earth made it easy to dig into the ground to create galleries and to expand existing hypogea.

Built on property owned by Flavia Domitilla, the imperial family of Vespasian, the catacombs are among the oldest and largest in Rome. From the nuclei to the composition of the great subterranean necropolises, the stages and developments of Christianity can be traced.

Developed between the second and third centuries, this underground cemetery consists of three main regions. The first region includes the Cubicle of Ampliato, which belonged to a family of imperial freedmen who had dug the hypogeum; this vast environment is separated into two sections by an arch used to support a landslide vault. The decoration on the cubicle was redecorated one on top of another with each family member being placed within it. The second region contains the Flavi Aureli, whose entrance staircase would eventually be destroyed by the construction of the basilica during the fourth century. The Flavi Aureli is a double cubicle that houses an inscription mentioning a "Happy Annio" and intact tombs. The third region includes the lavish hypogeum of the Flavi and another area containing a group of martyrs.

During the fourth century, the basilica and two more regions were constructed, the south and southwest regions. The south includes a crypt of six saints found in polygonal cubicles, one of which contains a frescoes depicting a scene of the coronation sanctorum. The southwest region consists of regular galleries and the cubicle of the great apostles.

== Architecture ==
=== Basilica ===
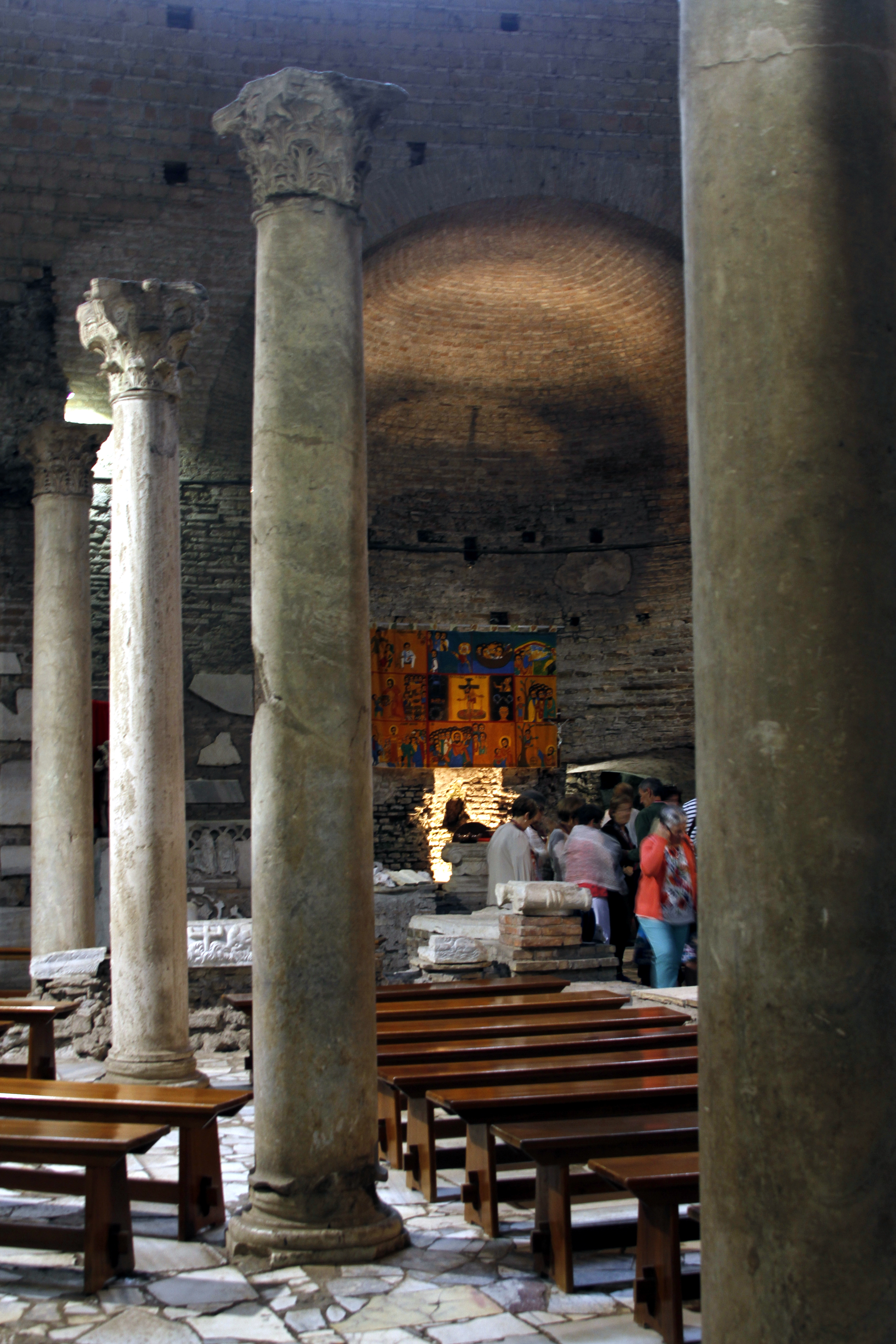
Basilica of saints Nereus and Achilleus - Catacombs of Domitilla - Rome 2016

Added to the complex at the end of the fourth century, during the pontificate of Pope Damasus, the semi-underground basilica was built in dedication to Saints Nereus and Achilleus. The church was virtually lost in the early Middle Ages and rediscovered in the 1870s by the archaeologist Giovanni Battista de Rossi.

The basilica is composed of a narthex, three naves, an apse, and is separated by two rows of four columns. Of the main altar, there is only one surviving column which is decorated with a scene of the beheading of Achilleus. Behind the altar rests a cubiculum containing an arcosolium with a fresco of Saint Petronilla. Generally, historians assume Petronilla as a Roman saint or martyr, celebrated as the daughter of Saint Peter and revered by the Franks. Although her remains were removed from Domitilla and moved to the Vatican at the insistence of the Frankish king, it is believed that the cult of Petronilla was celebrated in the underground basilica of Nereus and Achilleus, relating her hagiography to their Passions.

=== Cubicles/Galleries ===
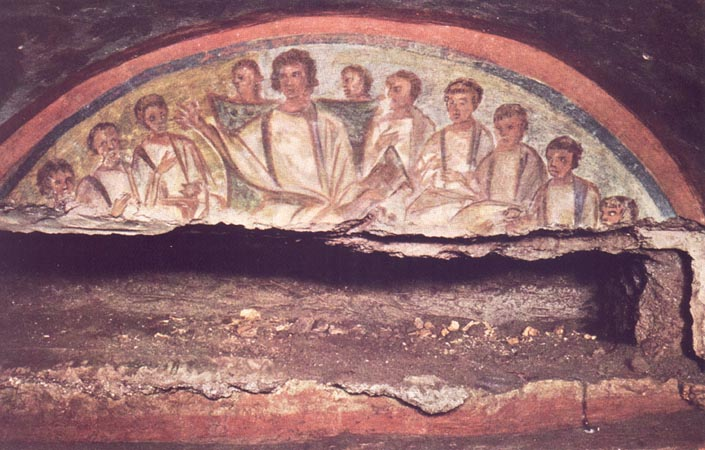
Jesus and apostles, circa 200 A.D.

Inside the Catacombs of Domitilla are images, some of which were revealed by the restoration, reflecting the life of bakers, grape vines, Jesus with the apostles, Noah's ark, and Daniel with the lions. Other biblical figures in the various cubicula include the Virgin Mary with child, Adam, Eve, Jonah, The Good Shepherd, a young man dressed as a cardinal with apostles Peter and Paul. Non-biblical, or pagan, figures include representations of Spring and Summer in the form of females with wings, both pictured with attendants and scenes depicting Orpheus surrounded by birds, beasts and the sheep that typically accompany him. There are also other images of mythological and wild or tame beasts beyond the depictions of Orpheus.

==== Pagan imagery in Christian context ====
Orpheus is one of the best-known of the pagan mythological figures that occur in early Christian art and the representation of him charming the beasts includes some of the most undeniably pagan scenes to appear in Christian settings. For the most part, the iconography associated with Orpheus is unchanging. He is typically depicted on a rock with a lyre resting on his left knee and the plectrum in his right hand. The change, however, is found in the type of animal depicted with Orpheus; traditional pagan imagery depicts Orpheus accompanied by "wild, beast-like creatures", while the later Christian interpretations depict him with gentle animals such as sheep and doves. The transference from wild to gentle animals proposes an intentional modification related to early Christian funerary practice. In the scene of Orpheus in the Catacombs of Domitilla, Orpheus is depicted in the pagan tradition of being accompanied by beasts. The use of the pagan imagery in the Christian catacombs would have been used to suggest man's taming of his passions as a step toward Salvation. Another possible reason for the pagan imagery could be an insinuation of the Messianic Kingdom, in which peace could be found among all beings.

==== Cubicle dei fornai ====
During the late fourth century, the Dei Fonai "the baker's" cubicle was part of newer regions being excavated, revealing a burial chamber likely owned by a baker or perhaps a senior officer who oversaw the food supplies. The corridor of the cubicle was revealed to be garnished with coffered ceilings and interior decorations, including a reproduction series of opus sectile on the hoof of the inner curve of the four arcosolia depicting painted scenes of the prophet Jonah. Pre-Constantinian Christians valued the three stages of Jonah's cycle, Jonah cast into the sea, Jonah and the Ketos, and Jonah at rest. Christian artists emphasized the third Jonah-at-rest and represented him in the visual tradition of Endymion. Visual representations of Endymion made the journey from mosaics and tombs to represent Jonah in Christian catacombs of the third to fifth centuries.

The western sector depicts a bucolic scene with a shepherd and four sheep and the representation of the season in the form of geniuses, while the eastern sector, is the depiction of Christ enthroned with two groups of apostles on the sides and the principles of Peter and Paul seated at the foreground. Frescoes of four biblical scenes are depicted on the walls of the corridor, including the binding of Isaac and Noah, as well as Jesus in multiplication of loaves and the miracle water from the rock. At the end of the corridor sits the bakers' cubicle, where themes and representation of the baker are represented on the entrance by a figure standing behind a large container for wheat. Scenes of the bakery are depicted along a continuous frieze depicting the arrival of the wheat at the Ostia harbor, the transport of the bags, and the distribution throughout the city.

==== Hypogeum of Flavi ====
Dating back to the end of the second century and the oldest nucleus of the site, the Flavian hypogeum is composed of a large gallery featuring four niches that host the sarcophagi homing the most important members of the family.

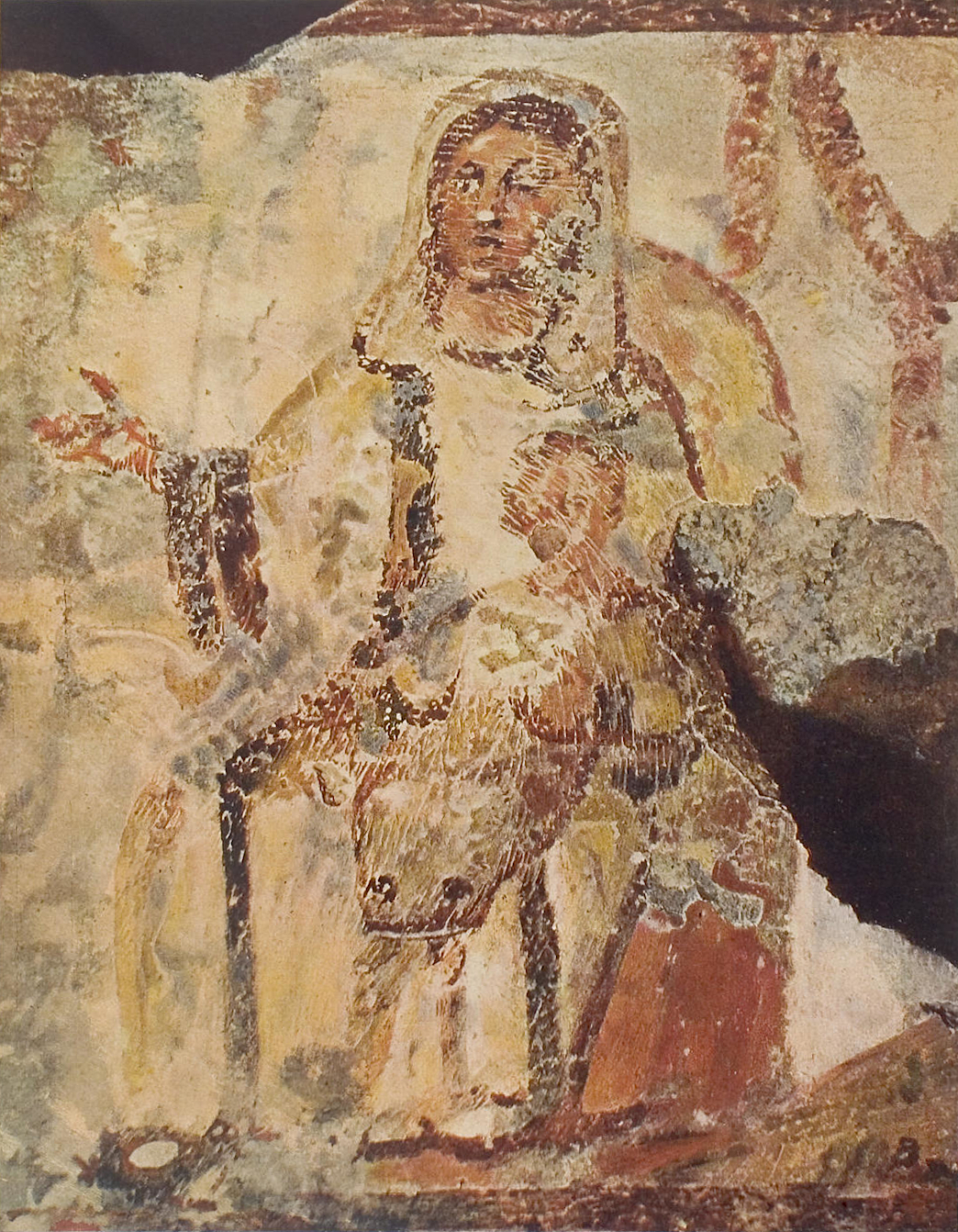
300-350 A.D. Mary and Jesus in scene of adoration by the Magi, Domitilla Catacomb.

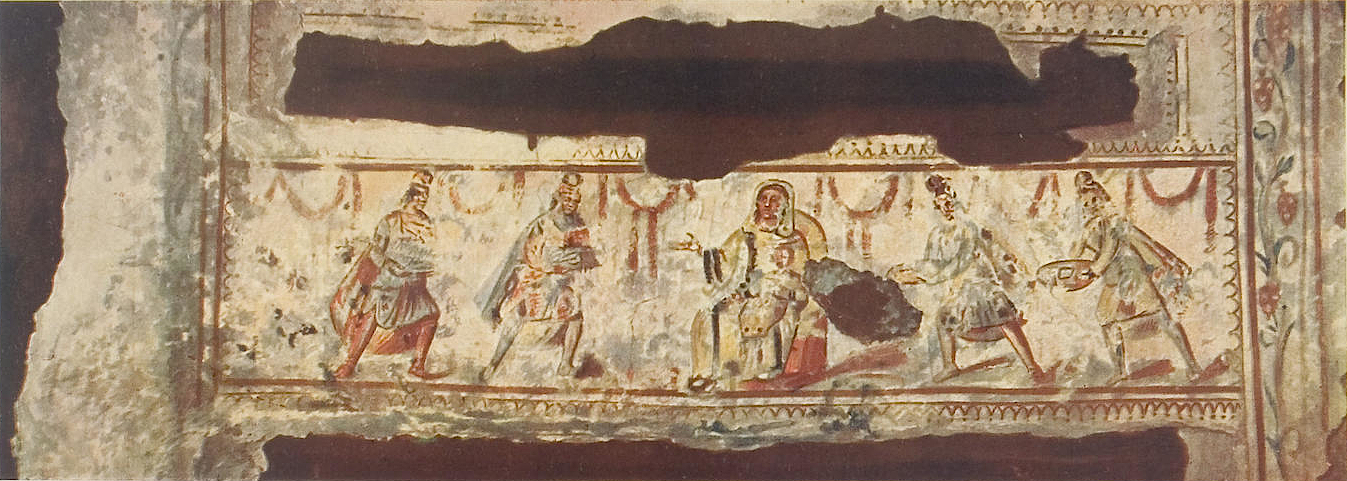
300-350 A.D. Adoration of the Magi, Domitilla Catacomb

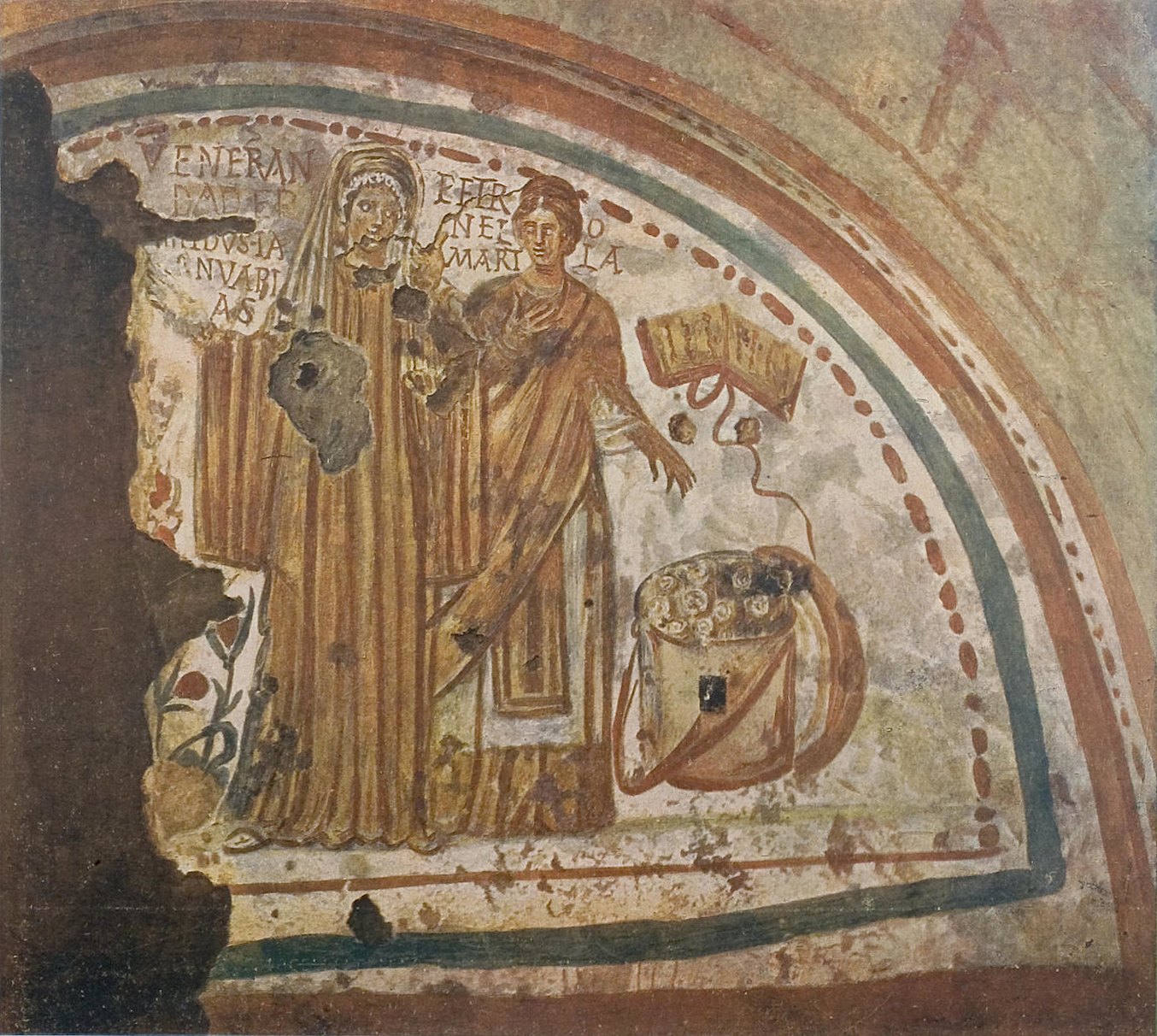
Fresco in the Catacomb of Domitilla in which Saint Petronilla is shown leading the deceased Veneranda to paradise).

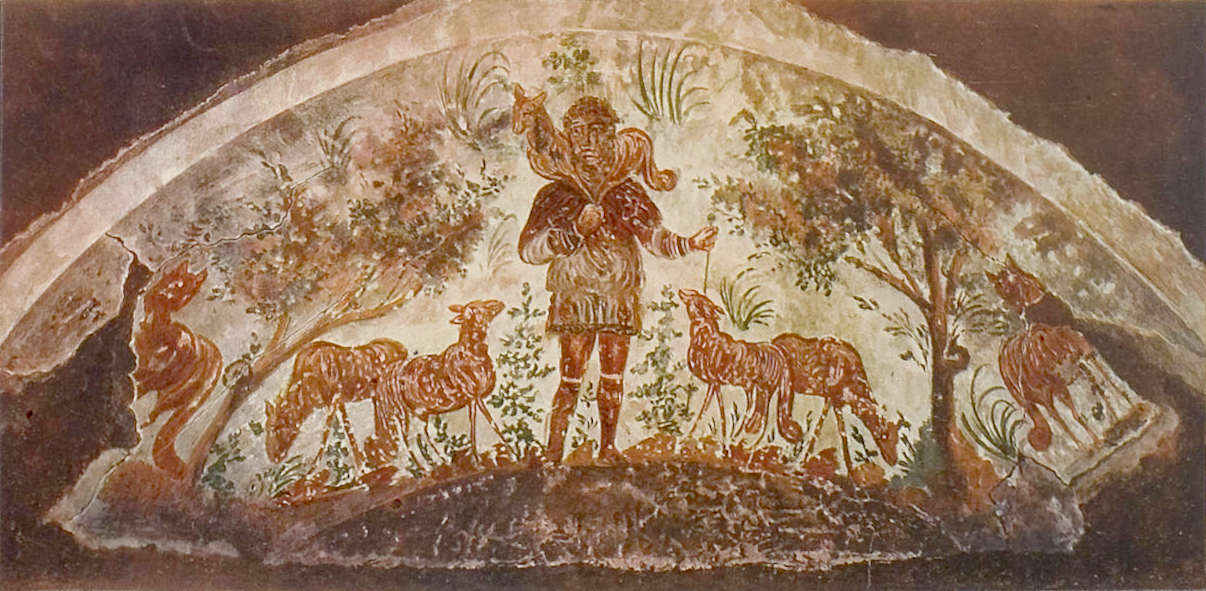
The Good Shepherd

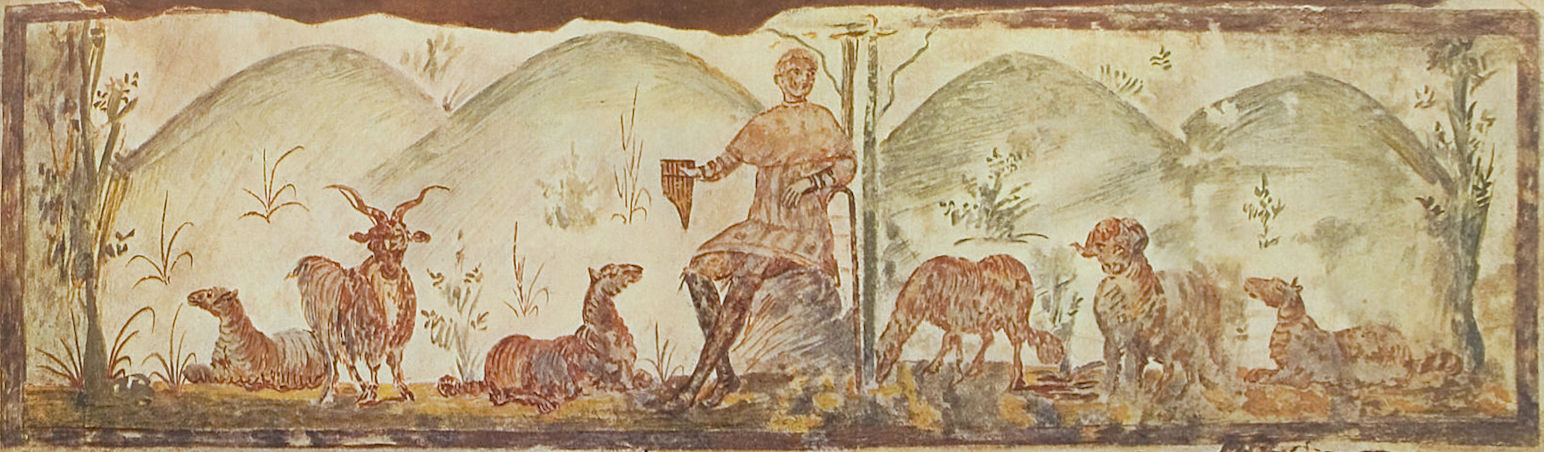
Shepherd holding panpipes with his flock

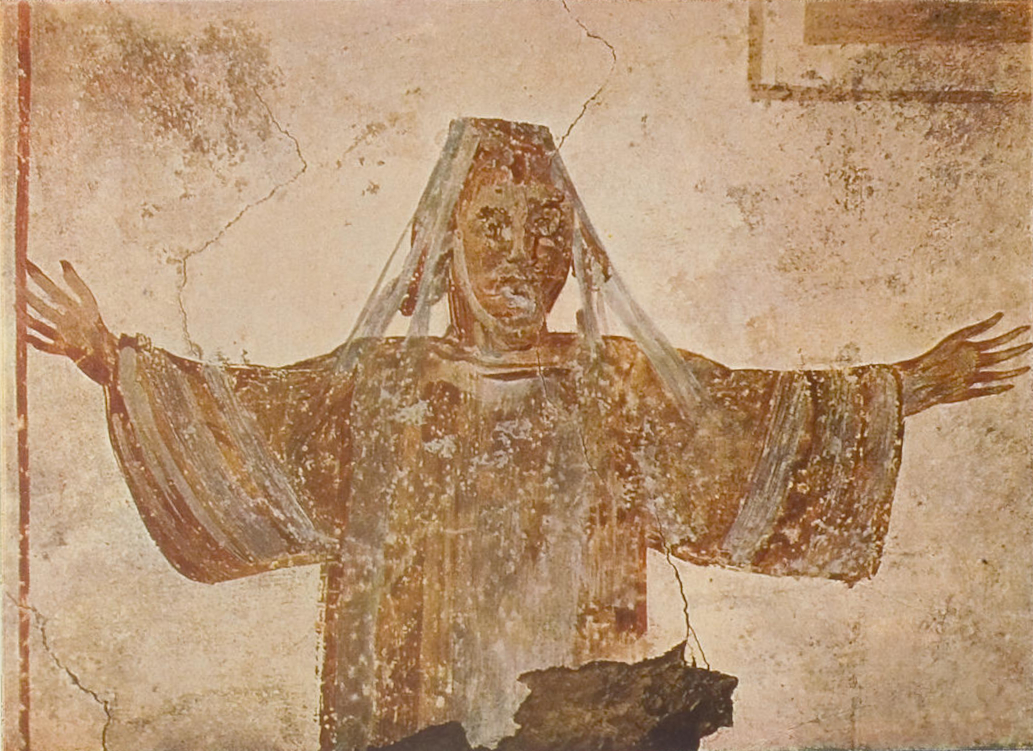
Woman praying as orans

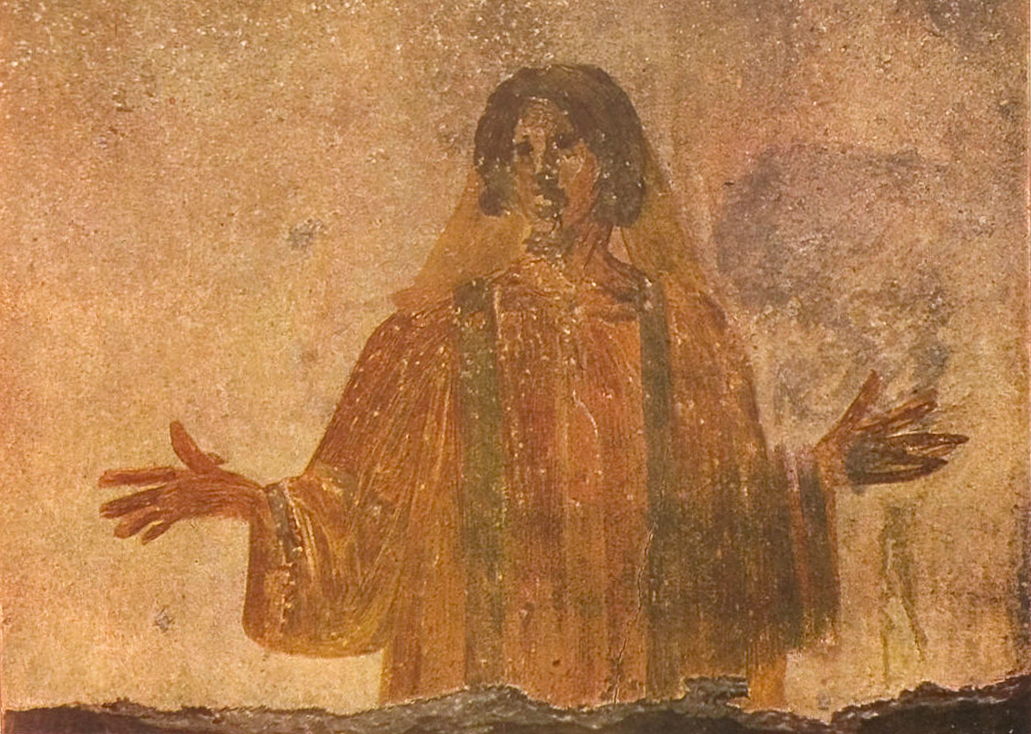

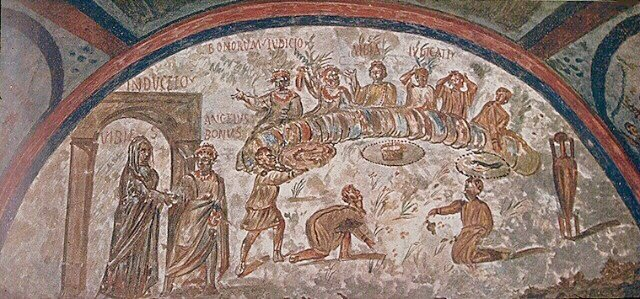
Feast in the catacomb with bread and fish (Eucharist)

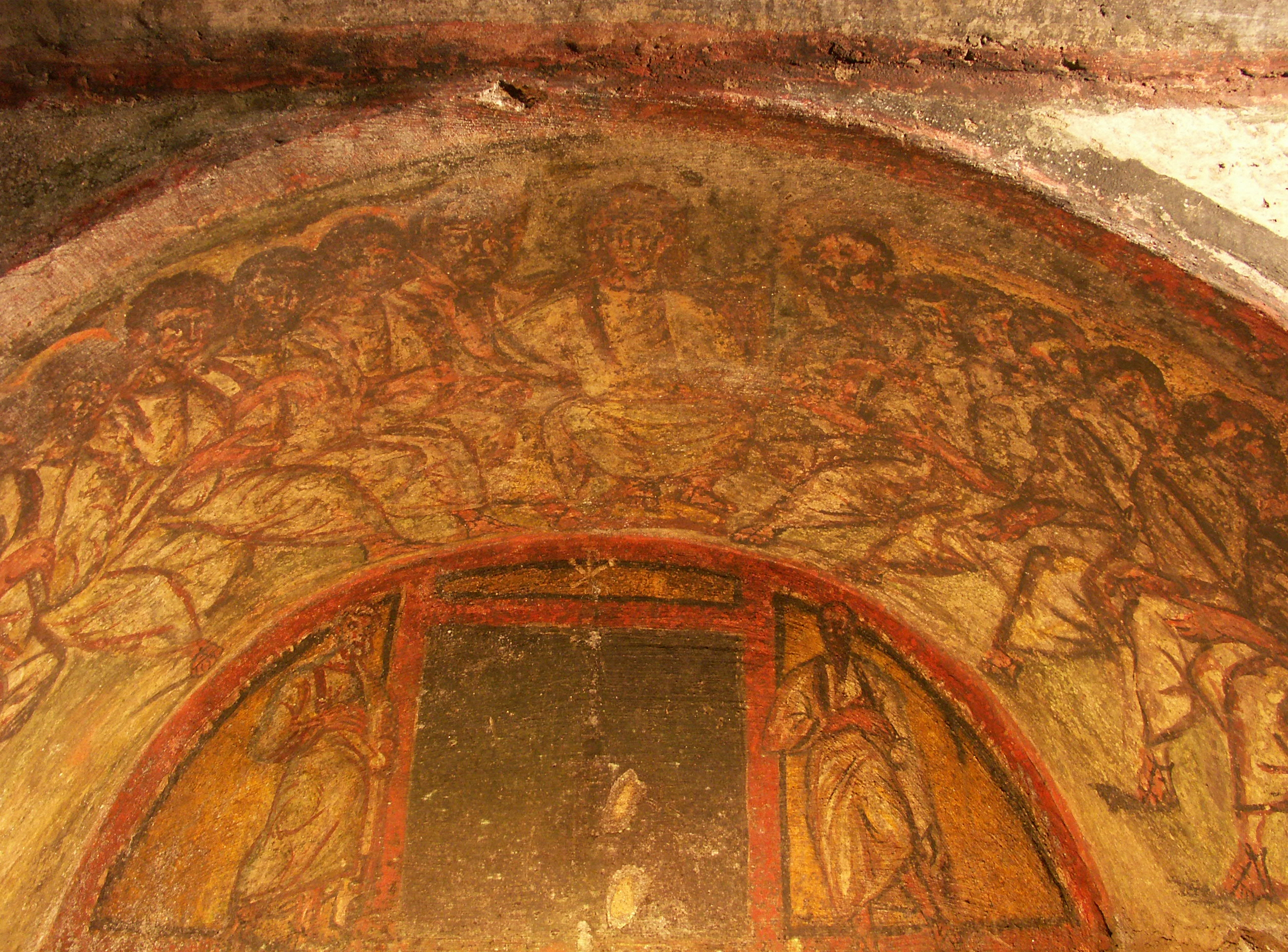
Christ with the 12 Apostles

== Current use ==
=== Ownership ===
As of January 2009, the Catacombs of Domitilla were entrusted to the Society of the Divine Word (SVD). SVD has been responsible for the care of the sacred place, as well as communicate the deep meaning of its history. The Catacombs are currently open to the public for guided tours and the Priests and Brothers of this missionary Congregation hope to convey the cultural and spiritual complexity of the Christian Catacombs to all who visit. The Catacombs are also available to be requested for the celebration of the Eucharist, to hold services, or ecumenical liturgies in the basilica or the burial chambers. The SVD believes that visiting this historical location and seeing the testimonies of ancient centuries through the fragments of frescoes, provides the opportunity to understand the various aspects early Christian life, their faith in Christ, and their hope in the resurrection and life eternal.

=== Renovation ===
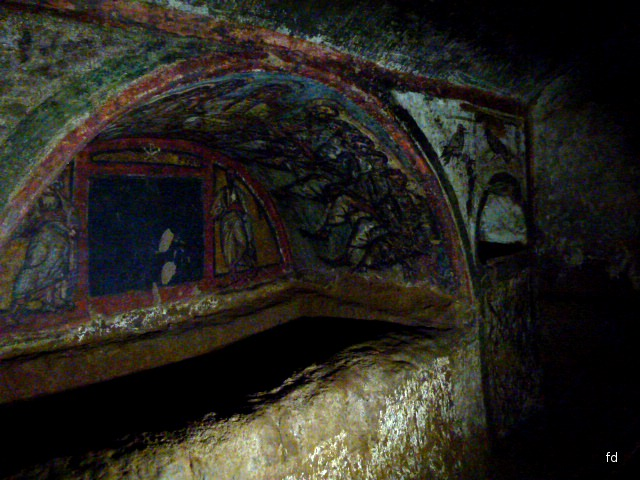
Domitilla catacomb

So far, only 12 out of about 70 rooms have been restored. What was revealed were both pagan and Christian inspired frescoes. Two frescoes commemorating the city's early Christian roots have been exposed thanks to a seven-year restoration project, using laser instruments to burn away chalky deposits, algae, and residual smoke from oil lamps. Scenes depicting Old and New Testament figures, likely commissioned 1,600 years ago, emerged from the debris and pollution and provided useful context to the transition period from Paganism to Christianity.

== See also ==
- Domitilla the Younger
- Flavia Domitilla (wife of Clemens)

Preceded by Casal Rotondo	Landmarks of Rome; Catacombs of Domitilla	Succeeded by Catacombs of Rome
