= Ulmus glabra 'Nigra' =

Elm cultivar

- Species: Ulmus glabra
- Cultivar: 'Nigra'
- Origin: Éire

The Wych Elm cultivar Ulmus glabra 'Nigra', commonly known as the Black Irish Elm, was found in the Kilkenny area c.1770 by the father of nurseryman John Robertson of Kilkenny, who later cultivated it. Robertson stated that he had not seen the form outside Ireland. It was listed by Loddiges (1830) as Ulmus nigra, and described by Loudon in Arboretum et Fruticetum Britannicum (1838), as Ulmus montana nigra. 'Nigra' is not mentioned in either Elwes and Henry's or Bean's classic works on British trees.

The Späth nursery of Berlin marketed an U. montana nigra in the late 19th century. Späth, like many of his contemporaries, used U. montana both for wych elm cultivars and for those of U. × hollandica.

Though 'Nigra' is sometimes listed as a synonym of 'Cinerea' (see 'Synonymy'), the leaf-descriptions of the two cultivars appear to distinguish them, the latter having leaves recalling those of Exeter Elm. Loddiges' 1830 catalogue lists the two separately.

== Description ==
Robertson stated that 'The Black Irish Elm' took its name from its dark chestnut-coloured young shoots, and that it made a slender, erect tree when old. Loudon described the tree as of moderate size, with a spreading habit like wych elm, but comprising rather irregular, contorted branches bearing much smaller, more rugose leaves, of a much deeper green than the species. Späth's U. montana nigra, by contrast, was "large-leaved, with dark-green foliage".

== Cultivation ==
Loudon reported that the tree ripened seed in Ireland. Robertson sent specimens to the National Botanic Gardens, Glasnevin, and to Edinburgh. It was also grown in the 19th century in the Horticultural Society's Garden at Chiswick and the Royal Victoria Park, Bath, at the western end of the Royal Avenue. U. montana nigra was introduced to the Dominion Arboretum, Ottawa, Canada, probably from Späth, in 1899. The tree is not known to have been introduced to Australasia, nor is it known to be in commerce.

== Synonymy ==
- Ulmus cinerea: Kirchner, in Petzold & Kirchner, Arboretum Muscaviense 565, 1864, name in synonymy.
- ?Ulmus glabra 'Cinerea': RBG Electronic Plant Information Centre 2007.

== Accessions ==
Europe

- ?Wakehurst Place, UK. Acc. no. 1973.21051, as U. glabra 'Cinerea'
