= Promicromonosporaceae =

Scientific classification
- Domain: Bacteria
- Kingdom: Bacillati
- Phylum: Actinomycetota
- Class: Actinomycetes
- Order: Micrococcales
- Family: Promicromonosporaceae; Rainey et al. 1997

Type genus
- Promicromonospora Krassilnikov et al. 1961 (Approved Lists 1980)

Genera
- Antribacter Zhang et al. 2019; Cellulosimicrobium Schumann et al. 2001; Isoptericola Stackebrandt et al. 2004; Krasilnikoviella Nishijima et al. 2017; Luteimicrobium Hamada et al. 2010; Myceligenerans Cui et al. 2004; Oerskovia Prauser et al. 1970 (Approved Lists 1980); Paraoerskovia Khan et al. 2009; Promicromonospora Krassilnikov et al. 1961 (Approved Lists 1980); Puerhibacterium Yang et al. 2021; Sediminihabitans Hamada et al. 2012; Tropicihabitans Hamada et al. 2015; Xylanimonas Rivas et al. 2003

Synonyms
- Oerskoviaceae Salam et al. 2020

Family of bacteria

Promicromonosporaceae is an Actinomycete family.

== Phylogeny ==
The currently accepted taxonomy is based on the List of Prokaryotic names with Standing in Nomenclature and the phylogeny is based on whole-genome sequences. (Note: Antribacter, Myceligenerans, Sediminihabitans, and Tropicihabitans are not included in this phylogenetic tree.)

- - Promicromonosporaceae
    - Luteimicrobium
    - - - Promicromonospora
        - - Xylanimonas
          - - Krasilnikoviella
            - Isoptericola
      - - Paraoerskovia
        - - Oerskovia
          - Cellulosimicrobium
  - outgroup
    Jonesiaceae
