= Mesophilus =

Mesophilus may refer to:

- Brassicibacter mesophilus, species of bacteria
- Galbibacter mesophilus, species of bacteria
- Gelidibacter mesophilus, species of bacteria
- Mechercharimyces mesophilus, species of bacteria
- Nocardioides mesophilus, species of bacteria
- Streptomyces mesophilus, species of bacteria
- Tepidibacter mesophilus, species of bacteria
- Terrimesophilobacter mesophilus, species of bacteria
