= Herbiconiux moechotypicola =

Scientific classification
- Domain: Bacteria
- Kingdom: Bacillati
- Phylum: Actinomycetota
- Class: Actinomycetes
- Order: Micrococcales
- Family: Microbacteriaceae
- Genus: Herbiconiux
- Species: H. moechotypicola

Binomial name
- Herbiconiux moechotypicola Kim et al. 2012

Type strain
- JCM 16117; KCTC 19653; RB-62

Species of bacterium

Herbiconiux moechotypicola is a Gram-positive, rod-shaped and non-motile bacterium from the genus of Herbiconiux which has been isolated from the gut of the beetle Moechotypa diphysis in Korea.
