= HH15 =

HH15, HH-15, HH 15, HH.15, may refer to:

- HH15, one of the Hamburger–Hamilton stages in chick development
- Strain Hh15, the type strain for Cryobacterium luteum (C. luteum) bacteria

== See also ==
- HH (disambiguation)
- H15 (disambiguation)
- H (disambiguation)
