= A. flava =

A. flava may refer to:

- Aesculus flava, the yellow buckeye, common buckeye or sweet buckeye, a tree species native to the Ohio Valley and Appalachian Mountains of the Eastern United States
- Anomis flava, the cotton looper, tropical anomis or white-pupiled scallop moth, a moth species
- Antarcticimonas flava, a bacterium from the genus of Antarcticimonas
- Arenivirga flava, a bacterium from the genus of Arenivirga

== See also ==
- Flava (disambiguation)
