= Leifsonia xyli subsp. xyli =

Scientific classification
- Domain: Bacteria
- Kingdom: Bacillati
- Phylum: Actinomycetota
- Class: Actinomycetia
- Order: Micrococcales
- Family: Microbacteriaceae
- Genus: Leifsonia
- Species: L. xyli
- Subspecies: L. x. subsp. xyli

Trinomial name
- Leifsonia xyli subsp. xyli (Davis et al. 1984) Evtushenko et al. 2000

Subspecies of bacterium

Leifsonia xyli subsp. xyli is the bacterium that causes ratoon stunting disease, a major worldwide disease of sugarcane. It is Gram positive and grows slowly in the laboratory.

== Disease ==
Ratoon stunting disease is the most economically important disease of sugarcane, and is found in most sugarcane growing areas of the world. It can cause yield losses of up to 30% in susceptible varieties. The disease is difficult to identify and is transmitted mechanically or through infected seeds.

== Genetics ==
Leifsonia xyli has a genome that contains 2.58 Mbp with 2,044 protein coding genes.
