= Subtercola lobariae =

Scientific classification
- Domain: Bacteria
- Kingdom: Bacillati
- Phylum: Actinomycetota
- Class: Actinomycetes
- Order: Micrococcales
- Family: Microbacteriaceae
- Genus: Subtercola
- Species: S. lobariae

Binomial name
- Subtercola lobariae Si et al. 2017

Type strain
- CGMCC 1.12976; KCTC 33586; 9583b

Species of bacterium

Subtercola lobariae is a Gram-positive and aerobic bacterium from the genus Subtercola which has been isolated from the lichen Lobaria retigera from the Jiaozi Snow Mountain in China.
