= Mycetocola reblochoni =

Scientific classification
- Domain: Bacteria
- Kingdom: Bacillati
- Phylum: Actinomycetota
- Class: Actinomycetes
- Order: Micrococcales
- Family: Microbacteriaceae
- Genus: Mycetocola
- Species: M. reblochoni

Binomial name
- Mycetocola reblochoni Bora et al. 2008

Type strain
- DSM 18580; LMG 22367; BRB-1L41; R-20377

Species of bacteria

Mycetocola reblochoni is a Gram-positive, aerobic, non-spore-forming and rod-shaped bacterium from the genus Mycetocola which has been isolated from the surface of Reblochon cheese.
