= Glaciihabitans arcticus =

Scientific classification
- Domain: Bacteria
- Kingdom: Bacillati
- Phylum: Actinomycetota
- Class: Actinomycetes
- Order: Micrococcales
- Family: Microbacteriaceae
- Genus: Glaciihabitans
- Species: G. arcticus

Binomial name
- Glaciihabitans arcticus Dahal and Kim 2019

Type strain
- RP-3-7

Species of bacteria

Glaciihabitans arcticus is a Gram-positive, rod-shaped, psychrotolerant and non-motile bacterium from the genus Glaciihabitans which has been isolated from soil from the Cambridge Bay.
