= Amnibacterium endophyticum =

Scientific classification
- Domain: Bacteria
- Kingdom: Bacillati
- Phylum: Actinomycetota
- Class: Actinomycetes
- Order: Micrococcales
- Family: Microbacteriaceae
- Genus: Amnibacterium
- Species: A. endophyticum

Binomial name
- Amnibacterium endophyticum Li et al. 2018

Type strain
- T4Z-3^{T} KCTC 39983^{T} CGMCC 1.16066^{T}

Species of bacterium

Amnibacterium endophyticum is a Gram-positive, aerobic, non-spore-forming, short rod-shaped and non-motile bacterium from the genus of Amnibacterium which has been isolated from a branch of the tree Aegiceras corniculatum.
