= Herbiconiux solani =

Scientific classification
- Domain: Bacteria
- Kingdom: Bacillati
- Phylum: Actinomycetota
- Class: Actinomycetes
- Order: Micrococcales
- Family: Microbacteriaceae
- Genus: Herbiconiux
- Species: H. solani

Binomial name
- Herbiconiux solani Behrendt et al. 2011

Type strain
- DSM 19813; LMG 24387; NBRC 106740; K134/01

Species of bacterium

Herbiconiux solani is a bacterium from the genus of Herbiconiux which has been isolated from the phyllosphere of a potato plant from Dahnsdorf in Germany.
