= Amnibacterium kyonggiense =

Scientific classification
- Domain: Bacteria
- Kingdom: Bacillati
- Phylum: Actinomycetota
- Class: Actinomycetes
- Order: Micrococcales
- Family: Microbacteriaceae
- Genus: Amnibacterium
- Species: A. kyonggiense

Binomial name
- Amnibacterium kyonggiense Kim and Lee 2011

Type strain
- JCM 16463; KEMC 51201-037

Species of bacterium

Amnibacterium kyonggiense is a Gram-positive and non-motile bacterium from the genus of Amnibacterium which has been isolated from the Anyang stream in Korea.
