= Gulosibacter chungangensis =

Scientific classification
- Domain: Bacteria
- Kingdom: Bacillati
- Phylum: Actinomycetota
- Class: Actinomycetes
- Order: Micrococcales
- Family: Microbacteriaceae
- Genus: Gulosibacter
- Species: G. chungangensis

Binomial name
- Gulosibacter chungangensis Park et al. 2012

Type strain
- CAU 9625; CCUG 60841; KCTC 13959

Species of bacterium

Gulosibacter chungangensis is a Gram-positive, strictly aerobic and non-spore-forming bacterium from the genus Gulosibacter. It was isolated from marine sediments in the Yellow Sea, Korea.
