= Agrococcus baldri =

Scientific classification
- Domain: Bacteria
- Kingdom: Bacillati
- Phylum: Actinomycetota
- Class: Actinomycetes
- Order: Micrococcales
- Family: Microbacteriaceae
- Genus: Agrococcus
- Species: A. baldri

Binomial name
- Agrococcus baldri Zlamala et al. 2002

Type strain
- V-108

Species of bacterium

Agrococcus baldri is a Gram-positive bacterium from the genus Agrococcus which has been isolated from air in the Virgilkapelle.
