= Agreia pratensis =

Scientific classification
- Domain: Bacteria
- Kingdom: Bacillati
- Phylum: Actinomycetota
- Class: Actinomycetes
- Order: Micrococcales
- Family: Microbacteriaceae
- Genus: Agreia
- Species: A. pratensis

Binomial name
- Agreia pratensis (Behrendt et al. 2002) Schumann et al. 2003

Type strain
- DSM 14246

Synonyms
- Subtercola pratensis Behrendt et al. 2002

Species of bacteria

Agreia pratensis is a bacterium from the genus Agreia which has been isolated from groundwater from Finland.
