= Agrococcus casei =

Scientific classification
- Domain: Bacteria
- Kingdom: Bacillati
- Phylum: Actinomycetota
- Class: Actinomycetes
- Order: Micrococcales
- Family: Microbacteriaceae
- Genus: Agrococcus
- Species: A. casei

Binomial name
- Agrococcus casei Bora et al. 2007

Type strain
- R-17892t2

Species of bacterium

Agrococcus casei is a Gram-positive bacterium from the genus Agrococcus which has been isolated from the surfaces of smear-ripened cheese.
