= Humibacter ginsengisoli =

Scientific classification
- Domain: Bacteria
- Kingdom: Bacillati
- Phylum: Actinomycetota
- Class: Actinomycetes
- Order: Micrococcales
- Family: Microbacteriaceae
- Genus: Humibacter
- Species: H. ginsengisoli

Binomial name
- Humibacter ginsengisoli Kim et al. 2015

Type strain
- JCM 30080; KCTC 33521; DCY90

Species of bacterium

Humibacter ginsengisoli is a Gram-positive bacterium from the genus Humibacter which has been isolated from soil from a ginseng field in Korea.
