= Pseudoclavibacter terrae =

Scientific classification
- Domain: Bacteria
- Kingdom: Bacillati
- Phylum: Actinomycetota
- Class: Actinomycetes
- Order: Micrococcales
- Family: Microbacteriaceae
- Genus: Pseudoclavibacter
- Species: P. terrae

Binomial name
- Pseudoclavibacter terrae Du et al. 2015

Type strain
- CCTCC AB 2015124; KCTC 39562; THG-MD12

Species of bacteria

Pseudoclavibacter terrae is a Gram-positive, aerobic, rod-shaped and non-motile bacterium from the genus Pseudoclavibacter which has been isolated from rhizospheric soil of the plant Ophiopogon japonicus in China.
