= Agrococcus lahaulensis =

Scientific classification
- Domain: Bacteria
- Kingdom: Bacillati
- Phylum: Actinomycetota
- Class: Actinomycetes
- Order: Micrococcales
- Family: Microbacteriaceae
- Genus: Agrococcus
- Species: A. lahaulensis

Binomial name
- Agrococcus lahaulensis Mayilraj et al. 2006

Type strain
- K22-21

Species of bacterium

Agrococcus lahaulensis is a bacterium from the genus Agrococcus which has been isolated from soil from the Lahaul-Spiti Valley.
