= Mycetocola lacteus =

Scientific classification
- Domain: Bacteria
- Kingdom: Bacillati
- Phylum: Actinomycetota
- Class: Actinomycetes
- Order: Micrococcales
- Family: Microbacteriaceae
- Genus: Mycetocola
- Species: M. lacteus

Binomial name
- Mycetocola lacteus Tsukamoto et al. 2001

Type strain
- DSM 15177; IFO 16278; JCM 11654; MAFF 211326; NBRC 16278; NRRL B-24121; CM-10

Species of bacteria

Mycetocola lacteus is a species of Gram-positive, obligately aerobic and non-spore-forming bacterium in the genus Mycetocola which has been isolated from the cultivated mushroom Pleurotus ostreatus that is located in Japan.
