= Conyzicola lurida =

Scientific classification
- Domain: Bacteria
- Kingdom: Bacillati
- Phylum: Actinomycetota
- Class: Actinomycetes
- Order: Micrococcales
- Family: Microbacteriaceae
- Genus: Conyzicola
- Species: C. lurida

Binomial name
- Conyzicola lurida Kim et al. 2014

Type strain
- HWE2-01; JCM 19257; KCTC 29231

Species of bacterium

Conyzicola lurida is a Gram-positive, non-spore-forming and rod-shaped bacterium from the genus of Conyzicola which has been isolated from the surface of the root of the plant Conyza canadensis.
