= Frigoribacterium salinisoli =

Scientific classification
- Domain: Bacteria
- Kingdom: Bacillati
- Phylum: Actinomycetota
- Class: Actinomycetes
- Order: Micrococcales
- Family: Microbacteriaceae
- Genus: Frigoribacterium
- Species: F. salinisoli

Binomial name
- Frigoribacterium salinisoli Kong et al. 2016

Type strain
- LAM9155; LAM9155-2; JCM 30848; LAM9155

Species of bacterium

Frigoribacterium salinisoli is a Gram-positive, short-rod and aerobic bacterium from the genus Frigoribacterium which has been isolated from saline soil from Lingxian in China.
