= Cryobacterium flavum =

Scientific classification
- Domain: Bacteria
- Kingdom: Bacillati
- Phylum: Actinomycetota
- Class: Actinomycetes
- Order: Micrococcales
- Family: Microbacteriaceae
- Genus: Cryobacterium
- Species: C. flavum

Binomial name
- Cryobacterium flavum Liu et al. 2012

Type strain
- CGMCC 1.11215; NBRC 107879; Hh8

Species of bacterium

Cryobacterium flavum is a Gram-positive and rod-shaped bacterium from the genus Cryobacterium which has been isolated from glacier ice from Xinjiang in China.
