= Rhodoglobus vestalii =

Scientific classification
- Domain: Bacteria
- Kingdom: Bacillati
- Phylum: Actinomycetota
- Class: Actinomycetes
- Order: Micrococcales
- Family: Microbacteriaceae
- Genus: Rhodoglobus
- Species: R. vestalii

Binomial name
- Rhodoglobus vestalii Sheridan et al. 2003

Type strain
- ATCC BAA-534; CIP 107482; JCM 12695; NBRC 103084; LV3

Species of bacterium

Rhodoglobus vestalii is a Gram-positive and psychrophilic bacterium from the genus Rhodoglobus which has been isolated from a dry Valley lake near the McMurdo Ice Shelf from the Antarctica.
