= Aurantimicrobium minutum =

Scientific classification
- Domain: Bacteria
- Kingdom: Bacillati
- Phylum: Actinomycetota
- Class: Actinomycetes
- Order: Micrococcales
- Family: Microbacteriaceae
- Genus: Aurantimicrobium
- Species: A. minutum

Binomial name
- Aurantimicrobium minutum Nakai et al. 2015

Type strain
- KNC

Species of bacterium

Aurantimicrobium minutum is a Gram-positive, aerobic, rod-shaped and non-motile bacterium from the genus of Aurantimicrobium which has been isolated from river water from Japan.
