= Okibacterium fritillariae =

Scientific classification
- Domain: Bacteria
- Kingdom: Bacillati
- Phylum: Actinomycetota
- Class: Actinomycetes
- Order: Micrococcales
- Family: Microbacteriaceae
- Genus: Okibacterium
- Species: O. fritillariae

Binomial name
- Okibacterium fritillariae Evtushenko et al. 2002

Type strain
- VKM Ac-2059; VKM Ac-2062; IFO 16404; JCM 12284; NBRC 16404

Species of bacterium

Okibacterium fritillariae is a bacterium from the genus Okibacterium which has been isolated from seeds of Fritillaria ruthenica and Clematis recta.
