= Agrococcus versicolor =

Scientific classification
- Domain: Bacteria
- Kingdom: Bacillati
- Phylum: Actinomycetota
- Class: Actinomycetes
- Order: Micrococcales
- Family: Microbacteriaceae
- Genus: Agrococcus
- Species: A. versicolor

Binomial name
- Agrococcus versicolor Behrendt et al. 2008

Type strain
- DSM 19812; JCM 16026; K 114/01; LMG 24386

Species of bacterium

Agrococcus versicolor is a bacterium from the genus Agrococcus which has been isolated from the phyllosphere of potato plants.
