= Klugiella xanthotipulae =

Scientific classification
- Domain: Bacteria
- Kingdom: Bacillati
- Phylum: Actinomycetota
- Class: Actinomycetes
- Order: Micrococcales
- Family: Microbacteriaceae
- Genus: Klugiella; Cook et al. 2008
- Species: K. xanthotipulae

Binomial name
- Klugiella xanthotipulae Cook et al. 2008

Type strain
- 44C3; ATCC BAA-1524; DSM 18031; JCM 16542

Species of bacteria

Klugiella xanthotipulae is a species of bacteria from the family Microbacteriaceae which has been isolated from a larva of the insect Tipula abdominalis from Michigan in the United States.

The genus, Klugiella, is named after the American microbiologist Michael J. Klug.
