= Salinibacterium amurskyense =

Scientific classification
- Domain: Bacteria
- Kingdom: Bacillati
- Phylum: Actinomycetota
- Class: Actinomycetes
- Order: Micrococcales
- Family: Microbacteriaceae
- Genus: Salinibacterium
- Species: S. amurskyense

Binomial name
- Salinibacterium amurskyense Han et al. 2003

Type strain
- KMM 3673^{T} KCTC 9931^{T}

Species of bacterium

Salinibacterium amurskyense is a Gram-positive, non-motile, aerobic, non-spore-forming, irregular, rod-shaped actinobacteria, the type species of its genus.
