= Glaciihabitans tibetensis =

Scientific classification
- Domain: Bacteria
- Kingdom: Bacillati
- Phylum: Actinomycetota
- Class: Actinomycetes
- Order: Micrococcales
- Family: Microbacteriaceae
- Genus: Glaciihabitans
- Species: G. tibetensis

Binomial name
- Glaciihabitans tibetensis Li et al. 2014

Type strain
- MP203

Species of bacteria

Glaciihabitans tibetensis is a Gram-positive, aerobic, non-spore-forming and short-rod-shaped bacterium from the genus Glaciihabitans which has been isolated from ice water from the Midui Glacier in Tibet.
