= Mycetocola zhadangensis =

Scientific classification
- Domain: Bacteria
- Kingdom: Bacillati
- Phylum: Actinomycetota
- Class: Actinomycetes
- Order: Micrococcales
- Family: Microbacteriaceae
- Genus: Mycetocola
- Species: M. zhadangensis

Binomial name
- Mycetocola zhadangensis Shen et al. 2013

Type strain
- CGMCC 1.12042; KACC 16570; ZD1-4

Species of bacteria

Mycetocola zhadangensis is a Gram-positive, aerobic and short-rod-shaped bacterium from the genus Mycetocola which has been isolated from snow.
