= Curtobacterium flaccumfaciens =

Scientific classification
- Domain: Bacteria
- Kingdom: Bacillati
- Phylum: Actinomycetota
- Class: Actinomycetia
- Order: Micrococcales
- Family: Microbacteriaceae
- Genus: Curtobacterium
- Species: C. flaccumfaciens

Binomial name
- Curtobacterium flaccumfaciens (Hedges 1922) Collins and Jones 1984

Synonyms
- Bacterium flaccumfaciens Hedges 1922; Phytomonas flaccumfaciens (Hedges 1922) Bergey et al. 1923; Pseudomonas flaccumfaciens (Hedges 1922) Stevens 1925; Corynebacterium flaccumfaciens subsp. flaccumfaciens (Hedges 1922) Dowson 1942; Corynebacterium betae Keyworth et al. 1956; Corynebacterium flaccumfaciens subsp. betae (Keyworth et al. 1956) Carlson and Vidaver 1982; Corynebacterium oortii Saaltink and Maas Geesteranus 1969; Corynebacterium flaccumfaciens subsp. oortii (Saaltink and Maas Geesteranus 1969) Carlson and Vidaver 1982; Corynebacterium poinsettiae (Starr and Pirone 1942) Burkholder 1948; Corynebacterium flaccumfaciens subsp. poinsettiae (Starr and Pirone 1942) Carlson and Vidaver 1982; Corynebacterium flaccumfaciens (Hedges 1922) Dowson 1942

Pathogenic bacterium

Curtobacterium flaccumfaciens is a Gram-positive bacterium that causes disease on a variety of plants. Gram-positive bacteria characteristics include small irregular rods, lateral flagella, the ability to persist in aerobic environments, and cells containing catalase. In the interest of studying pathogenicity in plants, this species is broken down further into pathovars, which help to better describe the pathogen.

== Genomics ==
C. flaccumfaciens is a relatively young species, diverging only 172,000 years ago.

== Hosts and symptoms ==
Curtobacterium flaccumfacien is a bacterial wilt pathogen. The hallmark symptoms of bacterial wilt are leaf and petiole wilting. Chlorosis of the leaf and tissue occurs due to the lack of water transport. C. flaccumfaciens has a wide host range not limited to kidney beans, soybeans, tulips, and tomatoes. The species is separated into pathovars based on host range and symptoms. One of the economically important pathovars is C. f. pv. flaccumfaciens. This pathovar produces a bacterial wilt and its primary host range is the genus Phaseolus (beans), but the pathogen can infect many other species of the same family (Fabaceae). In beans, the symptoms can be devastating to the crop yield. These beans have severe foliage wilting and chlorosis.

One ornamental example is C. f. pv. oortii. The primary host are plants from the genus Tulipa (tulips). Although the host range differs, the symptoms are relatively similar. During flowering, typical symptoms of dehydration are observed. Similarly to beans, the tulips get wilt. In severe cases, the plant eventually fails to recover from wilting and dies.

== Disease cycle ==
=== Survival ===
Curtobacterium flaccumfaciens can overwinter in plant debris, diseased plants, wild hosts, seeds, or vegetative propagative organs. The bacteria can survive only a couple of weeks as free bacteria in soil. Multiple factors go into survival of a bacterial population, including temperature, humidity, and soil characteristics. Infected seeds cannot be used for susceptible bean crops because Curtobacterium flaccumfaciens pv. flaccumfaciens has been known to survive in dried bean pods from five years and up to 24 years in laboratory conditions. Different pathovars survive in slightly different ways. For example, Curtobacterium flaccumfaciens pv. oortii survive in the vegetative propagative organs (bulbs) rather than in the seeds, like Curtobacterium flaccumfaciens pv. flaccumfaciens.

=== Dispersal ===
Curtobacterium flaccumfaciens causes wilting at high populations and disperses in many ways. The bacteria multiply relatively quickly, which increases the possibility that Curtobacterium flaccumfaciens can shed from dying or dead plant material. The pathogen is normally dispersed via agricultural practices such as, planting saved seed and through farm equipment. In the case of beans & tulips, these practices move the propagule during the overwriting phase of their life cycles. This is effective dispersal for the pathogen.

=== Infection ===
Curtobacterium flaccumfaciens usually enters the plant though a wound. Natural wounds (created by excision of flowers or genesis of lateral roots) and unnatural wounds could become entry sites. There are no reports of vectors, but the nematode Meloidogyne incognita may assist entry by providing unnatural wounds.

== Management ==
Management varies for each between hosts. For this purpose, we will look specifically at the detection and control methods of Curtobacterium flaccumfaciens pv. flaccumfaciens. Since most plant pathogens are Gram-negative detection of Gram-positive bacterium, using methods such as the KOH test, is a beginners diagnostic tool used to identify this bacterium. Bacteria may be detected beneath the seedcoat by means of a combined cultural and slide agglutination test. Bean seed from countries where the disease is known to occur should be inspected for discoloration of the seedcoat. Immunofluorescence staining can also be used to detect the bacterium in contaminated seed lots. Control may be affected by using disease-free seed and crop rotations. Seeds grown in dry climates are usually free from infection and are, therefore, recommended for distribution. The strongest control regulations handed down by the European and Mediterranean Plant Protection Organization (EPPO) to date was a quarantine procedure. There is little resistance available commercially to C. f. pv. flaccumfaciens and antibiotics are ineffective.

== See also ==
- List of soybean diseases
