= Frondihabitans peucedani =

Scientific classification
- Domain: Bacteria
- Kingdom: Bacillati
- Phylum: Actinomycetota
- Class: Actinomycetes
- Order: Micrococcales
- Family: Microbacteriaceae
- Genus: Frondihabitans
- Species: F. peucedani

Binomial name
- Frondihabitans peucedani Lee 2010

Type strain
- CIP 110287; DSM 22180; JCM 17442; KCTC 13435; RS-15

Species of bacterium

Frondihabitans peucedani is a Gram-positive and aerobic bacterium from the genus Frondihabitans which has been isolated from rhizosphere soil of the plant Peucedanum japonicum from the Mara Island in Korea.
