= Pseudoclavibacter caeni =

Scientific classification
- Domain: Bacteria
- Kingdom: Bacillati
- Phylum: Actinomycetota
- Class: Actinomycetes
- Order: Micrococcales
- Family: Microbacteriaceae
- Genus: Pseudoclavibacter
- Species: P. caeni

Binomial name
- Pseudoclavibacter caeni Srinivasan et al. 2012

Type strain
- JCM 16921; KCTC 19773; MJ28

Species of bacteria

Pseudoclavibacter caeni is a Gram-positive, strictly aerobic, rod-shaped and non-motile bacterium from the genus Pseudoclavibacter which has been isolated from sludge from a sewage plant from Daejeon in Korea.
