= Leucobacter chromiireducens =

Scientific classification
- Domain: Bacteria
- Kingdom: Bacillati
- Phylum: Actinomycetota
- Class: Actinomycetes
- Order: Micrococcales
- Family: Microbacteriaceae
- Genus: Leucobacter
- Species: L. chromiireducens

Binomial name
- Leucobacter chromiireducens Morais et al. 2005

Type strain
- L-1^{T}

Species of bacterium

Leucobacter chromiireducens is a bacterium that was first isolated from a chromium-contaminated environment.
