= Agrococcus terreus =

Scientific classification
- Domain: Bacteria
- Kingdom: Bacillati
- Phylum: Actinomycetota
- Class: Actinomycetes
- Order: Micrococcales
- Family: Microbacteriaceae
- Genus: Agrococcus
- Species: A. jejuensis

Binomial name
- Agrococcus jejuensis Zhang et al. 2010

Type strain
- DNG5

Species of bacterium

Agrococcus terreus is a Gram-positive strictly aerobic, and non-motile bacterium from the genus Agrococcus which has been isolated from forest soil from the Changbai mountains.
