= Agrococcus citreus =

Scientific classification
- Domain: Bacteria
- Kingdom: Bacillati
- Phylum: Actinomycetota
- Class: Actinomycetes
- Order: Micrococcales
- Family: Microbacteriaceae
- Genus: Agrococcus
- Species: A. citreus

Binomial name
- Agrococcus citreus Wieser et al. 1999

Type strain
- DSM 12453

Species of bacterium

Agrococcus citreus is a bacterium from the genus Agrococcus which has been isolated from a wall painting from the chapel of Herberstein in Styria.
