= Subtercola boreus =

Scientific classification
- Domain: Bacteria
- Kingdom: Bacillati
- Phylum: Actinomycetota
- Class: Actinomycetes
- Order: Micrococcales
- Family: Microbacteriaceae
- Genus: Subtercola
- Species: S. boreus

Binomial name
- Subtercola boreus Männistö et al. 2000

Type strain
- ATCC BAA-168; CCUG 43135; CIP 106947; DSM 13056; JCM 11267; NBRC 103085; K300

Species of bacterium

Subtercola boreus is a psychrophilic bacterium from the genus Subtercola which has been isolated from groundwater from Finland.
