= Herbiconiux ginsengi =

Scientific classification
- Domain: Bacteria
- Kingdom: Bacillati
- Phylum: Actinomycetota
- Class: Actinomycetes
- Order: Micrococcales
- Family: Microbacteriaceae
- Genus: Herbiconiux
- Species: H. ginsengi

Binomial name
- Herbiconiux ginsengi (Qiu et al. 2007) Behrendt et al. 2011

Type strain
- CGMCC 4.3491; DSM 19088; JCM 13908; NBRC 104580 wged11

Synonyms
- Leifsonia ginsengi Qiu et al. 2007

Species of bacterium

Herbiconiux ginsengi is a Gram-positive, rod-shaped and non-motile bacterium from the genus of Herbiconiux which has been isolated from a ginseng root from Fusong County in China.
