= Humibacter aquilariae =

Scientific classification
- Domain: Bacteria
- Kingdom: Bacillati
- Phylum: Actinomycetota
- Class: Actinomycetes
- Order: Micrococcales
- Family: Microbacteriaceae
- Genus: Humibacter
- Species: H. aquilariae

Binomial name
- Humibacter aquilariae Lin et al. 2017

Type strain
- BCRC 80936; JCM 31199; CC-YTH161

Species of bacterium

Humibacter aquilariae is a Gram-positive and aerobic bacterium from the genus Humibacter which has been isolated from an agarwood chip.
