= Frigoribacterium endophyticum =

Scientific classification
- Domain: Bacteria
- Kingdom: Bacillati
- Phylum: Actinomycetota
- Class: Actinomycetes
- Order: Micrococcales
- Family: Microbacteriaceae
- Genus: Frigoribacterium
- Species: F. endophyticum

Binomial name
- Frigoribacterium endophyticum Wang et al. 2015

Type strain
- JCM 30093; KCTC 29493; EGI 6500707

Species of bacterium

Frigoribacterium endophyticum is a Gram-positive and non-motile bacterium from the genus Frigoribacterium which has been isolated from the roots of the plant Anabasis elatior from Urumqi in China.
