= Mycetocola miduiensis =

Scientific classification
- Domain: Bacteria
- Kingdom: Bacillati
- Phylum: Actinomycetota
- Class: Actinomycetes
- Order: Micrococcales
- Family: Microbacteriaceae
- Genus: Mycetocola
- Species: M. miduiensis

Binomial name
- Mycetocola miduiensis Zhu et al. 2013

Type strain
- CGMCC 1.11101; NBRC 107877; MD-T1-10-2

Species of bacteria

Mycetocola miduiensis is a Gram-positive, aerobic, psychrotolerant and non-spore-forming bacterium from the genus Mycetocola which has been isolated from soil from the Midui glacier from the Tibet Province.
