= Agrococcus pavilionensis =

Scientific classification
- Domain: Bacteria
- Kingdom: Bacillati
- Phylum: Actinomycetota
- Class: Actinomycetes
- Order: Micrococcales
- Family: Microbacteriaceae
- Genus: Agrococcus
- Species: A. pavilionensis

Binomial name
- Agrococcus pavilionensis White et al. 2018

Type strain
- RW1

Species of bacterium

Agrococcus pavilionensis is a bacterium from the genus Agrococcus.
