= Mycetocola saprophilus =

Scientific classification
- Domain: Bacteria
- Kingdom: Bacillati
- Phylum: Actinomycetota
- Class: Actinomycetes
- Order: Micrococcales
- Family: Microbacteriaceae
- Genus: Mycetocola
- Species: M. saprophilus

Binomial name
- Mycetocola saprophilus Tsukamoto et al. 2001

Type strain
- DSM 15178; IFO 16274; JCM 11655; MAFF 211324; NBRC 16274; NRRL B-24119; CM-01

Species of bacteria

Mycetocola saprophilus is a bacterium from the genus Mycetocola which has been isolated from the cultivated mushroom Pleurotus ostreatus in Japan.
