= Aurantimicrobium photophilum =

Scientific classification
- Domain: Bacteria
- Kingdom: Bacillati
- Phylum: Actinomycetota
- Class: Actinomycetes
- Order: Micrococcales
- Family: Microbacteriaceae
- Genus: Aurantimicrobium
- Species: A. photophilum

Binomial name
- Aurantimicrobium photophilum Hahn et al. 2021

Type strain
- MWH-Mo1

Species of bacterium

Aurantimicrobium photophilum is a bacterium from the genus of Aurantimicrobium which has been isolated from a freshwater lake.
