= Humibacter soli =

Scientific classification
- Domain: Bacteria
- Kingdom: Bacillati
- Phylum: Actinomycetota
- Class: Actinomycetes
- Order: Micrococcales
- Family: Microbacteriaceae
- Genus: Humibacter
- Species: H. soli

Binomial name
- Humibacter soli Park et al. 2016

Type strain
- JCM 31015; KCTC 39614; R1-20

Species of bacterium

Humibacter soli is a Gram-positive, short rod-shaped and non-motile bacterium from the genus Humibacter which has been isolated from soil.
