= Agreia bicolorata =

Scientific classification
- Domain: Bacteria
- Kingdom: Bacillati
- Phylum: Actinomycetota
- Class: Actinomycetes
- Order: Micrococcales
- Family: Microbacteriaceae
- Genus: Agreia
- Species: A. bicolorata

Binomial name
- Agreia bicolorata Evtushenko et al. 2001

Type strain
- VKM Ac-1804

Species of bacteria

Agreia bicolorata is a bacterium from the genus Agreia.
