= Labedella phragmitis =

Scientific classification
- Domain: Bacteria
- Kingdom: Bacillati
- Phylum: Actinomycetota
- Class: Actinomycetes
- Order: Micrococcales
- Family: Microbacteriaceae
- Genus: Labedella
- Species: L. phragmitis

Binomial name
- Labedella phragmitis Li et al. 2020

Type strain
- 11W25H-1

Species of bacterium

Labedella phragmitis is a Gram-positive, rod-shaped, non-spore-forming, aerobic and non-motile bacterium from the genus Labedella which has been isolated from the surface of a plant from the Taklamakan Desert.
