= Conyzicola nivalis =

Scientific classification
- Domain: Bacteria
- Kingdom: Bacillati
- Phylum: Actinomycetota
- Class: Actinomycetes
- Order: Micrococcales
- Family: Microbacteriaceae
- Genus: Conyzicola
- Species: C. nivalis

Binomial name
- Conyzicola nivalis Gu et al. 2017

Type strain
- CGMCC 1.12813; JCM 30076; ZD5-4

Species of bacterium

Conyzicola nivalis is a species of Gram-positive, psychrophilic, rod-shaped and non-motile bacterium from the genus of Conyzicola which has been isolated from snow from the Zadang Glacier from the Tibetan Plateau.
