= Frondihabitans cladoniiphilus =

Scientific classification
- Domain: Bacteria
- Kingdom: Bacillati
- Phylum: Actinomycetota
- Class: Actinomycetes
- Order: Micrococcales
- Family: Microbacteriaceae
- Genus: Frondihabitans
- Species: F. cladoniiphilus

Binomial name
- Frondihabitans cladoniiphilus Cardinale et al. 2011

Type strain
- CafT13; DSM 23273; JCM 18956; LMG 25550

Species of bacterium

Frondihabitans cladoniiphilus is a Gram-positive bacterium from the genus Frondihabitans which has been isolated from the thallus of the lichen Cladonia arbuscula from the Koralpe, Austria.
