= Amnibacterium soli =

Scientific classification
- Domain: Bacteria
- Kingdom: Bacillati
- Phylum: Actinomycetota
- Class: Actinomycetes
- Order: Micrococcales
- Family: Microbacteriaceae
- Genus: Amnibacterium
- Species: A. soli

Binomial name
- Amnibacterium soli Jin et al. 2013

Type strain
- JCM 19015; KCTC 33147; PB243

Species of bacterium

Amnibacterium soli is a Gram-positive, aerobic, non-spore-forming, short rod-shaped and non-motile bacterium from the genus of Amnibacterium which has been isolated from grass soil from Daejeon in Korea.
