= Okibacterium endophyticum =

Scientific classification
- Domain: Bacteria
- Kingdom: Bacillati
- Phylum: Actinomycetota
- Class: Actinomycetes
- Order: Micrococcales
- Family: Microbacteriaceae
- Genus: Okibacterium
- Species: O. endophyticum

Binomial name
- Okibacterium endophyticum Wang et al. 2015

Type strain
- JCM 30086; KCTC 29492; EGI650022

Species of bacterium

Okibacterium endophyticum is a Gram-positive and non-motile bacterium from the genus Okibacterium which has been isolated from the roots of the plant Salsola affinis from Xinjiang in China.
