= Agrococcus jejuensis =

Scientific classification
- Domain: Bacteria
- Kingdom: Bacillati
- Phylum: Actinomycetota
- Class: Actinomycetes
- Order: Micrococcales
- Family: Microbacteriaceae
- Genus: Agrococcus
- Species: A. jejuensis

Binomial name
- Agrococcus jejuensis Lee 2008

Type strain
- SSW1-48

Synonyms
- Phycibacter jejuensis

Species of bacterium

Agrococcus jejuensis is a non-endospore-forming, Gram-positive, rod-shaped and non-motile bacterium from the genus Agrococcus which has been isolated from dried seaweed from the beach of Jeju.
