= Humibacter antri =

Scientific classification
- Domain: Bacteria
- Kingdom: Bacillati
- Phylum: Actinomycetota
- Class: Actinomycetes
- Order: Micrococcales
- Family: Microbacteriaceae
- Genus: Humibacter
- Species: H. antri

Binomial name
- Humibacter antri Lee 2013

Type strain
- DSM 25738; KCTC 33009; D7-27

Species of bacterium

Humibacter antri is a Gram-positive, aerobic and non-motile bacterium from the genus Humibacter which has been isolated from soil from a cave from Jeju in Korea.
