= Cryobacterium roopkundense =

Scientific classification
- Domain: Bacteria
- Kingdom: Bacillati
- Phylum: Actinomycetota
- Class: Actinomycetes
- Order: Micrococcales
- Family: Microbacteriaceae
- Genus: Cryobacterium
- Species: C. roopkundense

Binomial name
- Cryobacterium roopkundense Reddy et al. 2010

Type strain
- DSM 21065; JCM 15131; RuGl7

Species of bacterium

Cryobacterium roopkundense is a Gram-positive, psychrophilic, aerobic and rod-shaped bacterium from the genus of Cryobacterium which has been isolated from soil from Lake Roopkund in the Himalayas.
