= Frigoribacterium faeni =

Scientific classification
- Domain: Bacteria
- Kingdom: Bacillati
- Phylum: Actinomycetota
- Class: Actinomycetes
- Order: Micrococcales
- Family: Microbacteriaceae
- Genus: Frigoribacterium
- Species: F. faeni

Binomial name
- Frigoribacterium faeni Kämpfer et al. 2000

Type strain
- Andersson 801; ATCC BAA-3; CIP 107823; DSM 10309; IAM 15122; JCM 11265; LMG 23384; NBRC 103066; VKM Ac-2505

Species of bacterium

Frigoribacterium faeni is a psychrophilic bacterium from the genus Frigoribacterium which has been isolated from hay dust from Finland.
