= Pseudoclavibacter soli =

Scientific classification
- Domain: Bacteria
- Kingdom: Bacillati
- Phylum: Actinomycetota
- Class: Actinomycetes
- Order: Micrococcales
- Family: Microbacteriaceae
- Genus: Pseudoclavibacter
- Species: P. soli

Binomial name
- Pseudoclavibacter soli Kim and Jung 2009

Type strain
- DSM 23366; JCM 15058; KCTC 19255; KP02

Species of bacteria

Pseudoclavibacter soli is a Gram-positive, aerobic, rod-shaped and non-motile bacterium from the genus Pseudoclavibacter which has been isolated from soil from a ginseng field from Daejeon in Korea.
