= Rhodoglobus aureus =

Scientific classification
- Domain: Bacteria
- Kingdom: Bacillati
- Phylum: Actinomycetota
- Class: Actinomycetes
- Order: Micrococcales
- Family: Microbacteriaceae
- Genus: Rhodoglobus
- Species: R. aureus

Binomial name
- Rhodoglobus aureus (Reddy et al. 2003) An et al. 2011

Type strain
- CIP 107785; DSM 15303; JCM 12762; MTCC 4657; CMS 81y

Synonyms
- Leifsonia aurea Reddy et al. 2003

Species of bacterium

Rhodoglobus aureus is a Gram-positive and psychrophilic bacterium from the genus Rhodoglobus which has been isolated from a pond from Wright Valley in the Antarctica.
