= Pseudoclavibacter chungangensis =

Scientific classification
- Domain: Bacteria
- Kingdom: Bacillati
- Phylum: Actinomycetota
- Class: Actinomycetes
- Order: Micrococcales
- Family: Microbacteriaceae
- Genus: Pseudoclavibacter
- Species: P. chungangensis

Binomial name
- Pseudoclavibacter chungangensis Cho et al. 2010

Type strain
- CCUG 58142; KCTC 22691; CAU 59

Species of bacteria

Pseudoclavibacter chungangensis is a Gram-positive and non-spore-forming bacterium from the genus Pseudoclavibacter which has been isolated from activated sludge from Cheonan in Korea.
