= Pseudoclavibacter helvolus =

Scientific classification
- Domain: Bacteria
- Kingdom: Bacillati
- Phylum: Actinomycetota
- Class: Actinomycetes
- Order: Micrococcales
- Family: Microbacteriaceae
- Genus: Pseudoclavibacter
- Species: P. helvolus

Binomial name
- Pseudoclavibacter helvolus Manaia et al. 2004

Type strain
- ATCC 13715; CCUG 43303; DSM 20419; IAM 14726; JCM 9491; NBRC 15775; TISTR 1509

Synonyms
- "Brevibacterium helvolum" (Zimmermann 1890) Lochhead 1955; Zimmermannella helvola Lin et al. 2004

Species of bacteria

Pseudoclavibacter helvolus is a bacterium from the genus Pseudoclavibacter which has been first isolated from butter.
