= Mycetocola zhujimingii =

Scientific classification
- Domain: Bacteria
- Kingdom: Bacillati
- Phylum: Actinomycetota
- Class: Actinomycetes
- Order: Micrococcales
- Family: Microbacteriaceae
- Genus: Mycetocola
- Species: M. zhujimingii

Binomial name
- Mycetocola zhujimingii Li et al. 2019

Type strain
- 449; CGMCC 1.16372; DSM 106173

Species of bacteria

Mycetocola zhujimingii is a Gram-positive, aerobic and short-rod-shaped bacterium from the genus Mycetocola which has been isolated from the faeces of the antelope Pantholops hodgsonii from the Qinghai-Tibet Plateau in China.
