= Frondihabitans australicus =

Scientific classification
- Domain: Bacteria
- Kingdom: Bacillati
- Phylum: Actinomycetota
- Class: Actinomycetes
- Order: Micrococcales
- Family: Microbacteriaceae
- Genus: Frondihabitans
- Species: F. australicus

Binomial name
- Frondihabitans australicus (Zhang et al. 2007) Greene et al. 2009

Type strain
- CIP 109654; DSM 17894; E1HC-02; JCM 13598

Synonyms
- Frondicola australicus Zhang et al. 2007

Species of bacterium

Frondihabitans australicus is a Gram-positive and aerobic bacterium from the genus Frondihabitans which has been isolated from leaf litters from Southeast Queensland in Australia.
