= Plantibacter flavus =

Scientific classification
- Domain: Bacteria
- Kingdom: Bacillati
- Phylum: Actinomycetota
- Class: Actinomycetes
- Order: Micrococcales
- Family: Microbacteriaceae
- Genus: Plantibacter
- Species: P. flavus

Binomial name
- Plantibacter flavus Behrendt et al. 2002

Type strain
- CIP 108227; CM 12144; DSM 14012; IAM 15049; JCM 12144; LMG 19919; NBRC 103081; P 297/02; VKM Ac-2504

Species of bacterium

Plantibacter flavus is a bacterium from the genus Plantibacter which has been isolated from the phyllosphere of grass from Paulinenaue in Germany.
