= Herbiconiux flava =

Scientific classification
- Domain: Bacteria
- Kingdom: Bacillati
- Phylum: Actinomycetota
- Class: Actinomycetes
- Order: Micrococcales
- Family: Microbacteriaceae
- Genus: Herbiconiux
- Species: H. flava

Binomial name
- Herbiconiux flava Hamada et al. 2012

Type strain
- DSM 26474; IFO 16403; NBRC 16403; VKM Ac-2058

Species of bacterium

Herbiconiux flava is a non-endospore-forming and non-motile bacterium from the genus of Herbiconiux which has been isolated from the phyllosphere of the grass-plant Carex.
