= Cryobacterium psychrophilum =

Scientific classification
- Domain: Bacteria
- Kingdom: Bacillati
- Phylum: Actinomycetota
- Class: Actinomycetes
- Order: Micrococcales
- Family: Microbacteriaceae
- Genus: Cryobacterium
- Species: C. psychrophilum

Binomial name
- Cryobacterium psychrophilum (ex Inoue and Komagata 1976) Suzuki et al. 1997

Type strain
- JCM 1463; IAM 12024; ATCC 43563; IFO 15735; NCIMB 2068

Synonyms
- "Curtobacterium psychrophilum" Inoue and Komagata 1976

Species of bacterium

Cryobacterium psychrophilum is the type species of the bacterial genus Cryobacterium. It is an obligately psychrophilic, Gram-positive irregular rod-shaped actinomycete.
