= Leucobacter komagatae =

Scientific classification
- Domain: Bacteria
- Kingdom: Bacillati
- Phylum: Actinomycetota
- Class: Actinomycetes
- Order: Micrococcales
- Family: Microbacteriaceae
- Genus: Leucobacter
- Species: L. komagatae

Binomial name
- Leucobacter komagatae Takeuchi et al. 1996

Type strain
- IFO 15245

Species of bacterium

Leucobacter komagatae is an aerobic, gram-positive, non-sporulating rod-shaped species of bacteria.
