= Humibacter albus =

Scientific classification
- Domain: Bacteria
- Kingdom: Bacillati
- Phylum: Actinomycetota
- Class: Actinomycetes
- Order: Micrococcales
- Family: Microbacteriaceae
- Genus: Humibacter
- Species: H. albus

Binomial name
- Humibacter albus Vaz-Moreira et al. 2008

Type strain
- CCUG 54538; DSM 18994; JCM 16029; LMG 23996; SC-083

Species of bacterium

Humibacter albus is a Gram-positive, strictly aerobic and motile bacterium from the genus Humibacter which has been isolated from sewage sludge from Porto in Portugal.
