= Cryobacterium arcticum =

Scientific classification
- Domain: Bacteria
- Kingdom: Bacillati
- Phylum: Actinomycetota
- Class: Actinomycetes
- Order: Micrococcales
- Family: Microbacteriaceae
- Genus: Cryobacterium
- Species: C. arcticum

Binomial name
- Cryobacterium arcticum Bajerski et al. 2011

Type strain
- DSM 22823; NCCB 100316; SK1

Species of bacterium

Cryobacterium arcticum is a Gram-positive, psychrotolerant and aerobic bacterium from the genus Cryobacterium which has been isolated from soil from Store Koldewey in Greenland.
