= Microcella putealis =

Scientific classification
- Domain: Bacteria
- Kingdom: Bacillati
- Phylum: Actinomycetota
- Class: Actinomycetes
- Order: Micrococcales
- Family: Microbacteriaceae
- Genus: Microcella
- Species: M. putealis

Binomial name
- Microcella putealis Tiago et al. 2005

Type strain
- CIP 108471; CV-2; DSM 19627; KCTC 19625; LMG 22692

Species of bacterium

Microcella putealis is an alkaliphilic and Gram-positive bacterium from the genus Microcella which has been isolated from alkaline groundwater from Cabeço de Vide, Southern Portugal.
