= Agrococcus carbonis =

Scientific classification
- Domain: Bacteria
- Kingdom: Bacillati
- Phylum: Actinomycetota
- Class: Actinomycetes
- Order: Micrococcales
- Family: Microbacteriaceae
- Genus: Agrococcus
- Species: A. carbonis

Binomial name
- Agrococcus carbonis Dhanjal et al. 2011

Type strain
- G4

Species of bacterium

Agrococcus carbonis is a Gram-positive, non-spore-forming and non-motile bacterium from the genus Agrococcus which has been isolated from soil from a coal mine.
