= Plantibacter auratus =

Scientific classification
- Domain: Bacteria
- Kingdom: Bacillati
- Phylum: Actinomycetota
- Class: Actinomycetes
- Order: Micrococcales
- Family: Microbacteriaceae
- Genus: Plantibacter
- Species: P. auratus

Binomial name
- Plantibacter auratus Lin and Yokota 2006

Type strain
- B.861; CIP 109383; DSM 19586; IAM 14817; IFO 15702; JCM 23192; NBRC 15702; NCDO 2317; NCFB 2317; NCIMB 9991

Species of bacterium

Plantibacter auratus is a Gram-positive, aerobic short rod-shaped and non-motile bacterium from the genus Plantibacter.
