= Cryobacterium aureum =

Scientific classification
- Domain: Bacteria
- Kingdom: Bacillati
- Phylum: Actinomycetota
- Class: Actinomycetes
- Order: Micrococcales
- Family: Microbacteriaceae
- Genus: Cryobacterium
- Species: C. aureum

Binomial name
- Cryobacterium aureum Liu et al. 2018

Type strain
- CGMCC 1.11213; Hh31; NBRC 107882

Species of bacterium

Cryobacterium aureum is a Gram-positive, psychrophilic and rod-shaped bacterium from the genus Cryobacterium which has been isolated from glacier ice in China.

== Characteristics ==
The name Cryobacterium aureum has been given on account of the bacteria being capable of survival at low temperatures (in this case, preferentially 8–14 °C) with colonies appearing with a gold or canary yellow colour, similar to the naming of Staphylococcus aureus. Cryobacterium aureum cells are motile, aerobic and approximately 0.9–1.6×0.4–0.6 μm in size.
