= Labedella gwakjiensis =

Scientific classification
- Domain: Bacteria
- Kingdom: Bacillati
- Phylum: Actinomycetota
- Class: Actinomycetes
- Order: Micrococcales
- Family: Microbacteriaceae
- Genus: Labedella
- Species: L. gwakjiensis

Binomial name
- Labedella gwakjiensis Lee 2007

Type strain
- JCM 14008; KCTC 19176; KSW2-17

Species of bacterium

Labedella gwakjiensis is a Gram-positive, rod-shaped and non-motile bacterium from the genus Labedella which has been isolated from dried seaweed from the coast of Jeju Island in Korea.
