= Cryobacterium levicorallinum =

Scientific classification
- Domain: Bacteria
- Kingdom: Bacillati
- Phylum: Actinomycetota
- Class: Actinomycetes
- Order: Micrococcales
- Family: Microbacteriaceae
- Genus: Cryobacterium
- Species: C. levicorallinum

Binomial name
- Cryobacterium levicorallinum Liu et al. 2013

Type strain
- CGMCC 1.11211; Hh28; Hh34; NBRC 107883

Species of bacterium

Cryobacterium levicorallinum is a psychrophilic and Gram-positive bacterium from the genus Cryobacterium which has been isolated from glacier ice from Xinjiang in China.
