= Cryobacterium psychrotolerans =

Scientific classification
- Domain: Bacteria
- Kingdom: Bacillati
- Phylum: Actinomycetota
- Class: Actinomycetes
- Order: Micrococcales
- Family: Microbacteriaceae
- Genus: Cryobacterium
- Species: C. psychrotolerans

Binomial name
- Cryobacterium psychrotolerans Zhang et al. 2007

Type strain
- CGMCC 1.5382; JCM 13925; 0549

Species of bacterium

Cryobacterium psychrotolerans is a Gram-positive, aerobic and psychrotolerant bacterium from the genus Cryobacterium which has been isolated from frozen soil from a glacier from the Xinjiang Uygur Autonomous Region in China.
