= Pseudoclavibacter endophyticus =

Scientific classification
- Domain: Bacteria
- Kingdom: Bacillati
- Phylum: Actinomycetota
- Class: Actinomycetes
- Order: Micrococcales
- Family: Microbacteriaceae
- Genus: Pseudoclavibacter
- Species: P. endophyticus

Binomial name
- Pseudoclavibacter endophyticus Li et al. 2016

Type strain
- CGMCC 1.15081; DSM 29943; KCTC 39112

Species of bacteria

Pseudoclavibacter endophyticus is a Gram-positive, aerobic, rod-shaped and non-motile bacterium from the genus Pseudoclavibacter which has been isolated from the roots of the plant Glycyrrhiza uralensis from Yili County in China.
