= Labedella endophytica =

Scientific classification
- Domain: Bacteria
- Kingdom: Bacillati
- Phylum: Actinomycetota
- Class: Actinomycetes
- Order: Micrococcales
- Family: Microbacteriaceae
- Genus: Labedella
- Species: L. endophytica

Binomial name
- Labedella endophytica Wang et al. 2015

Type strain
- CPCC 203961; JCM 30092; KCTC 29494; EGI 6500705

Species of bacterium

Labedella endophytica is a Gram-positive, aerobic, endophytic and non-motile bacterium from the genus Labedella which has been isolated from the stem of the plant Anabasis elatior from Urumqi in China.
