= Agrococcus jenensis =

Scientific classification
- Domain: Bacteria
- Kingdom: Bacillati
- Phylum: Actinomycetota
- Class: Actinomycetes
- Order: Micrococcales
- Family: Microbacteriaceae
- Genus: Agrococcus
- Species: A. jenensis

Binomial name
- Agrococcus jenensis Groth et al. 1996

Type strain
- 2002-39/1^{T} DSM 9580

Species of bacterium

Agrococcus jenensis is the type species of the bacterial genus Agrococcus. It is notable for having diaminobutyric acid in its cell wall peptidoglycans.
