= Leifsonia xyli =

Scientific classification
- Domain: Bacteria
- Kingdom: Bacillati
- Phylum: Actinomycetota
- Class: Actinomycetes
- Order: Micrococcales
- Family: Microbacteriaceae
- Genus: Leifsonia
- Species: L. xyli

Binomial name
- Leifsonia xyli (Davis et al. 1984) Evtushenko et al. 2000

Type strain
- ATCC 33974; ICMP 7127; L1A; LMG 7352; NCPPB 3152; PDDCC 7127

Subspecies
- L. x. subsp. cynodontis (Davis et al. 1984) Evtushenko et al. 2000; L. x. subsp. xyli (Davis et al. 1984) Evtushenko et al. 2000

Synonyms
- Clavibacter xyli Davis et al. 1984

Genus of bacteria

Leifsonia xyli is a Gram-positive species of bacteria from the family Microbacteriaceae.
