= Frondihabitans sucicola =

Scientific classification
- Domain: Bacteria
- Kingdom: Bacillati
- Phylum: Actinomycetota
- Class: Actinomycetes
- Order: Micrococcales
- Family: Microbacteriaceae
- Genus: Frondihabitans
- Species: F. sucicola

Binomial name
- Frondihabitans sucicola Kim et al. 2014

Type strain
- GRS42; KACC 15521; NBRC 108728

Species of bacterium

Frondihabitans sucicola is a Gram-positive, aerobic, mesophilic, rod-shaped and motile bacterium from the genus Frondihabitans which has been isolated from the sap of the tree Acer mono in Korea.
