= Mycetocola manganoxydans =

Scientific classification
- Domain: Bacteria
- Kingdom: Bacillati
- Phylum: Actinomycetota
- Class: Actinomycetes
- Order: Micrococcales
- Family: Microbacteriaceae
- Genus: Mycetocola
- Species: M. manganoxydans

Binomial name
- Mycetocola manganoxydans Luo et al. 2012

Type strain
- CCTCC AB 209002; KCTC 19753; MB1-14; MB1-7

Species of bacteria

Mycetocola manganoxydans is a Gram-positive, aerobic and non-spore-forming bacterium from the genus Mycetocola which has been isolated from the Taklamakan Desert.
