= Microcella alkaliphila =

Scientific classification
- Domain: Bacteria
- Kingdom: Bacillati
- Phylum: Actinomycetota
- Class: Actinomycetes
- Order: Micrococcales
- Family: Microbacteriaceae
- Genus: Microcella
- Species: M. alkaliphila

Binomial name
- Microcella alkaliphila Tiago et al. 2006

Type strain
- AC4r; CIP 108473; DSM 18851; KCTC 19624; LMG 22690

Species of bacterium

Microcella alkaliphila is a Gram-positive bacterium from the genus of Microcella which has been isolated from alkaline groundwater from Cabeço de Vide, Southern Portugal.
