= Crocebacterium ilecola =

Scientific classification
- Domain: Bacteria
- Kingdom: Bacillati
- Phylum: Actinomycetota
- Class: Actinomycetes
- Order: Micrococcales
- Family: Microbacteriaceae
- Genus: "Crocebacterium"; Rogers and Doran-Peterson 2010
- Species: C. ilecola

Binomial name
- Crocebacterium ilecola Rogers and Doran-Peterson 2010

Type strain
- ATCC BAA-1359; T202

Genus of bacteria

"Crocebacterium ilecola" is a Gram-positive, non-spore-forming and motile species of bacteria from the family of Microbacteriaceae. "Crocebacterium ilecola" has been isolated from the hindgut of the larva Tipula abdominalis from United States.
