= Amnibacterium =

Scientific classification
- Domain: Bacteria
- Kingdom: Bacillati
- Phylum: Actinomycetota
- Class: Actinomycetes
- Order: Micrococcales
- Family: Microbacteriaceae
- Genus: Amnibacterium; Kim and Lee 2011

Type species
- Amnibacterium kyonggiense Kim and Lee 2011

Species
- A. endophyticum Li et al. 2018; A. flavum Tuo et al. 2019; A. kyonggiense Kim and Lee 2011; A. setariae Kim et al. 2021; A. soli Jin et al. 2013

Genus of bacteria

Amnibacterium is a genus of bacteria from the family of Microbacteriaceae.
