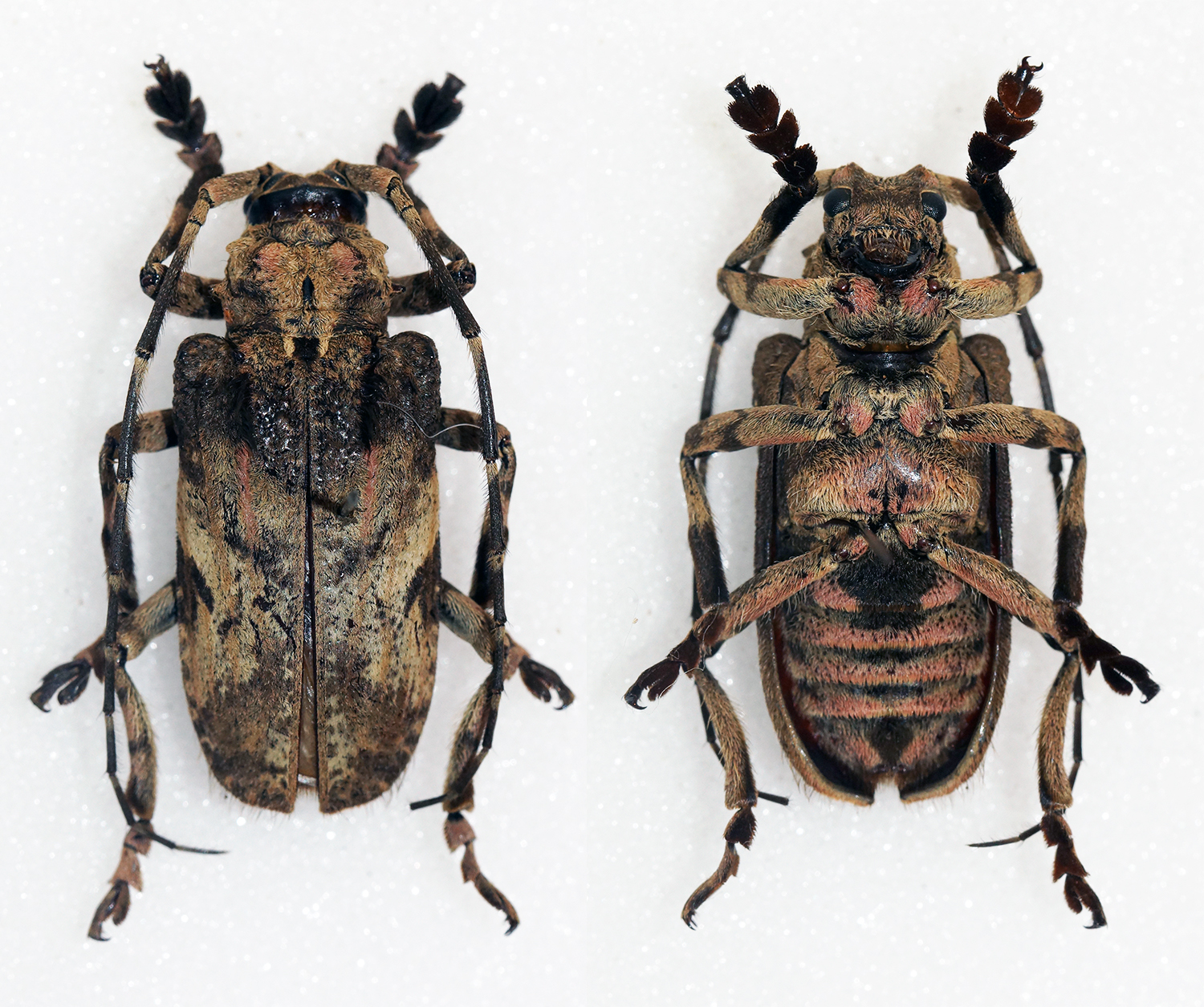

Scientific classification
- Kingdom: Animalia
- Phylum: Arthropoda
- Clade: Pancrustacea
- Class: Insecta
- Order: Coleoptera
- Suborder: Polyphaga
- Infraorder: Cucujiformia
- Family: Cerambycidae
- Genus: Moechotypa
- Species: M. thoracica

Binomial name
- Moechotypa thoracica (White, 1858)

Synonyms
- Nyphona thoracica White, 1858

= Moechotypa thoracica =

Species of beetle

Moechotypa thoracica is a species of beetle in the family Cerambycidae. It was described by White in 1858. It is known from India, Borneo, Laos, Sumatra, Vietnam, and Java.
