= Allohumibacter endophyticus =

Scientific classification
- Domain: Bacteria
- Kingdom: Bacillati
- Phylum: Actinomycetota
- Class: Actinomycetes
- Order: Micrococcales
- Family: Microbacteriaceae
- Genus: Allohumibacter; Kim et al. 2016
- Species: A. endophyticus

Binomial name
- Allohumibacter endophyticus Kim et al. 2016

Type strain
- JCM 19371; KCTC 29232; MWE-A11

Genus of bacteria

Allohumibacter is a Gram-positive, aerobic and short rod-shaped species of bacteria from the family of Microbacteriaceae which has been isolated from the roots of the plant Artemisia princeps.
