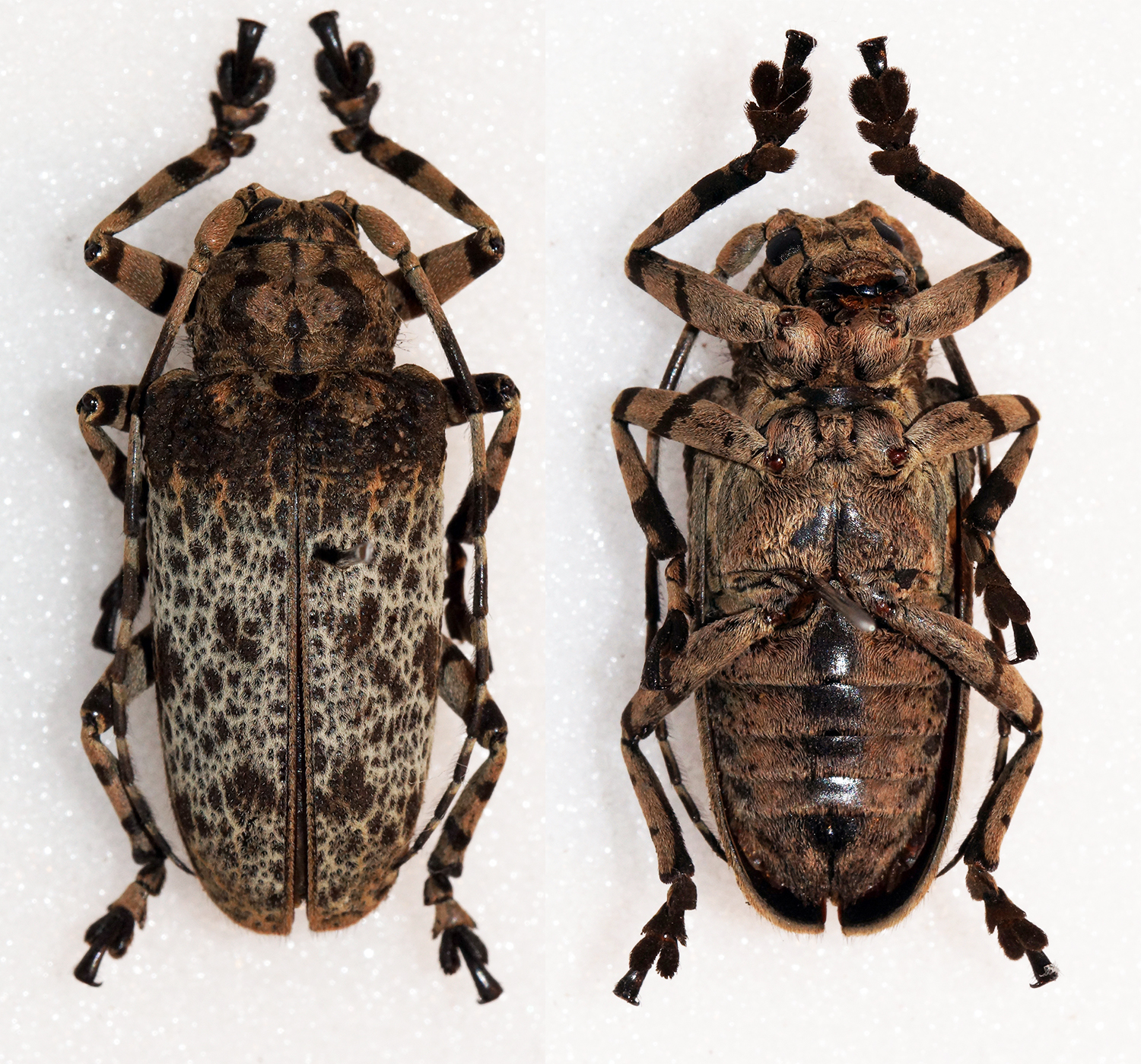

Scientific classification
- Kingdom: Animalia
- Phylum: Arthropoda
- Class: Insecta
- Order: Coleoptera
- Suborder: Polyphaga
- Infraorder: Cucujiformia
- Family: Cerambycidae
- Genus: Moechotypa
- Species: M. marmorea

Binomial name
- Moechotypa marmorea Pascoe, 1864

= Moechotypa marmorea =

Species of beetle

Moechotypa marmorea is a species of beetle in the family Cerambycidae. It was described by Pascoe in 1864. They are known to be found on Borneo.
