= Microcella =

Scientific classification
- Domain: Bacteria
- Kingdom: Bacillati
- Phylum: Actinomycetota
- Class: Actinomycetes
- Order: Micrococcales
- Family: Microbacteriaceae
- Genus: Microcella; Tiago et al. 2005

Type species
- Microcella putealis Tiago et al. 2005

Species
- M. alkalica Xie et al. 2022; M. alkaliphila Tiago et al. 2006; M. flavibacter Xie et al. 2022; M. frigidaquae (Baik et al. 2010) Xie et al. 2022; "M. indica" (Pei et al. 2021) Xie et al. 2021; M. putealis Tiago et al. 2005

Synonyms
- Chryseoglobus Baik et al. 2010; Yonghaparkia Yoon et al. 2006

Genus of bacteria

Microcella is a Gram-positive, non-spore-forming, aerobic and non-motile genus of bacteria in the family Microbacteriaceae.
