= Pseudoclavibacter =

Scientific classification
- Domain: Bacteria
- Kingdom: Bacillati
- Phylum: Actinomycetota
- Class: Actinomycetes
- Order: Micrococcales
- Family: Microbacteriaceae
- Genus: Pseudoclavibacter; Manaia et al. 2004

Type species
- Pseudoclavibacter helvolus Manaia et al. 2004

Species
- "P. albus" (Lin et al. 2004) Vandamme et al. 2022; "P. bifida" Kim and Jung 2009; P. caeni Srinivasan et al. 2012; P. chungangensis Cho et al. 2010; P. endophyticus Li et al. 2016; P. helvolus Manaia et al. 2004; P. soli Kim and Jung 2009; P. terrae Du et al. 2015; "P. triregionum" Vandamme et al. 2022

Synonyms
- "Caespitibacter" Vandamme et al. 2022; Zimmermannella Lin et al. 2004

Genus of bacteria

Pseudoclavibacter is a Gram-positive non-spore-forming, strictly aerobic and non-motile genus from the family Microbacteriaceae. Pseudoclavibacter bacteria can cause endocarditis in rare cases.
