= Plantibacter =

Scientific classification
- Domain: Bacteria
- Kingdom: Bacillati
- Phylum: Actinomycetota
- Class: Actinomycetes
- Order: Micrococcales
- Family: Microbacteriaceae
- Genus: Plantibacter; Behrendt et al. 2002

Type species
- Plantibacter flavus Behrendt et al. 2002

Species
- P. auratus Lin and Yokota 2006; P. flavus Behrendt et al. 2002

Genus of bacteria

Plantibacter is a Gram-positive, non-spore-forming and non-motile genus of bacteria from the family Microbacteriaceae.
