= Humibacter =

Scientific classification
- Domain: Bacteria
- Kingdom: Bacillati
- Phylum: Actinomycetota
- Class: Actinomycetes
- Order: Micrococcales
- Family: Microbacteriaceae
- Genus: Humibacter; Vaz-Moreira et al. 2008

Type species
- Humibacter albus Vaz-Moreira et al. 2008

Species
- H. albus Vaz-Moreira et al. 2008; H. antri Lee 2013; H. aquilariae Lin et al. 2017; H. ginsengisoli Kim et al. 2015; H. ginsengiterrae Kim et al. 2015; H. soli Park et al. 2016

Genus of bacteria

Humibacter is a Gram-positive, mesophilic, strictly aerobic, chemoorganotrophic and motile genus of bacteria from the family Microbacteriaceae. Humibacter occur in sewage sludge.
