= Moechotypa suffusa =

Scientific classification
- Kingdom: Animalia
- Phylum: Arthropoda
- Class: Insecta
- Order: Coleoptera
- Suborder: Polyphaga
- Infraorder: Cucujiformia
- Family: Cerambycidae
- Genus: Moechotypa
- Species: M. suffusa

Binomial name
- Moechotypa suffusa (Pascoe, 1862)

Synonyms
- Moechotypa arida Thomson, 1864; Niphona suffusa Pascoe, 1862

Species of beetle

Moechotypa suffusa is a species of beetle in the family Cerambycidae. It was described by Pascoe in 1862. It is known from China, Cambodia, Thailand, Laos, and Vietnam.
