= Canibacter oris =

Scientific classification
- Domain: Bacteria
- Kingdom: Bacillati
- Phylum: Actinomycetota
- Class: Actinomycetes
- Order: Micrococcales
- Family: Microbacteriaceae
- Genus: Canibacter; Aravena-Romá et al. 2014
- Species: C. oris

Binomial name
- Canibacter oris Aravena-Romá et al. 2014

Type strain
- CCUG 64069; DSM 27064; IMMIB Q2029717

Genus of bacteria

Canibacter oris is a Gram-positive, facultatively anaerobic, non-spore-forming and non-motile species of bacteria from the family of Microbacteriaceae, which has been isolated from a human wound caused by a dog bite in Australia.
