= Gelidibacter algens =

Scientific classification
- Domain: Bacteria
- Kingdom: Pseudomonadati
- Phylum: Bacteroidota
- Class: Flavobacteriia
- Order: Flavobacteriales
- Family: Flavobacteriaceae
- Genus: Gelidibacter
- Species: G. algens

Binomial name
- Gelidibacter algens Bowman et al. 1997

Species of bacterium

Gelidibacter algens is a species of psychrophilic, yellow-pigmented bacteria. It is saccharolytic, exhibits rapid gliding motility, and its cells are rod-like to filamentous. Its type strain is ACAM 536.
