= Gelidibacter =

Scientific classification
- Domain: Bacteria
- Kingdom: Pseudomonadati
- Phylum: Bacteroidota
- Class: Flavobacteriia
- Order: Flavobacteriales
- Family: Flavobacteriaceae
- Genus: Gelidibacter; Bowman et al. 1997

Type species
- Gelidibacter algens

Species
- G. algens G. gilvus G. mesophilus G. salicanalis G. sediminis

Genus of bacteria

Gelidibacter is a Gram-negative and rod-shaped bacteria genus from the family of Flavobacteriaceae.
