= Conyzicola =

Scientific classification
- Domain: Bacteria
- Kingdom: Bacillati
- Phylum: Actinomycetota
- Class: Actinomycetes
- Order: Micrococcales
- Family: Microbacteriaceae
- Genus: Conyzicola; Kim et al. 2014

Type species
- Conyzicola lurida Kim et al. 2014

Species
- C. lurida Kim et al. 2014; C. nivalis Gu et al. 2017

Genus of bacteria

Conyzicola is a genus of bacteria from the family Microbacteriaceae.
