= Curtobacterium =

Scientific classification
- Domain: Bacteria
- Kingdom: Bacillati
- Phylum: Actinomycetota
- Class: Actinomycetes
- Order: Micrococcales
- Family: Microbacteriaceae
- Genus: Curtobacterium; Yamada and Komagata 1972 (Approved Lists 1980)

Type species
- Curtobacterium citreum (Komagata and Iizuka 1964) Yamada and Komagata 1972 (Approved Lists 1980)

Species
- C. albidum (Komagata and Iizuka 1964) Yamada and Komagata 1972 (Approved Lists 1980); C. ammoniigenes Aizawa et al. 2007; C. citreum (Komagata and Iizuka 1964) Yamada and Komagata 1972 (Approved Lists 1980); C. flaccumfaciens (Hedges 1922) Collins and Jones 1984; C. herbarum Behrendt et al. 2002; C. luteum (Komagata and Iizuka 1964) Yamada and Komagata 1972 (Approved Lists 1980); "C. oceanosedimentum (Carty and Litchfield 1978) Kim et al. 2009; C. plantarum Dunleavy 1989; C. pusillum (Iizuka and Komagata 1965) Yamada and Komagata 1972 (Approved Lists 1980)

Genus of bacteria

Curtobacterium is a genus of bacteria of the order Actinomycetales. They are Gram-positive soil organisms.

An analysis of Curtobacterium sequences from around the globe revealed the genus to be a cosmopolitan terrestrial taxon, with isolates derived primarily from plant and soil habitat.
