= Moechotypa sikkimensis =

Scientific classification
- Kingdom: Animalia
- Phylum: Arthropoda
- Clade: Pancrustacea
- Class: Insecta
- Order: Coleoptera
- Suborder: Polyphaga
- Infraorder: Cucujiformia
- Family: Cerambycidae
- Genus: Moechotypa
- Species: M. sikkimensis

Binomial name
- Moechotypa sikkimensis Breuning, 1936

Species of beetle

Moechotypa sikkimensis is a species of beetle in the family Cerambycidae. It was described by Stephan von Breuning in 1936. It is known from India.The species is distributed in India (Sikkim and Darjeeling), China, Vietnam, Laos, Myanmar, and Nepal.
