= Salinibacterium =

Scientific classification
- Domain: Bacteria
- Kingdom: Bacillati
- Phylum: Actinomycetota
- Class: Actinomycetes
- Order: Micrococcales
- Family: Microbacteriaceae
- Genus: Salinibacterium; Han et al. 2003

Type species
- Salinibacterium amurskyense Han et al. 2003

Species
- S. amurskyense Han et al. 2003; S. hongtaonis Li et al. 2019; S. xinjiangense Zhang et al. 2008

Genus of bacteria

Salinibacterium is a Gram-positive, aerobic, non-spore-forming and non-motile bacterial genus from the family Microbacteriaceae.
