= Moechotypa javana =

Scientific classification
- Kingdom: Animalia
- Phylum: Arthropoda
- Clade: Pancrustacea
- Class: Insecta
- Order: Coleoptera
- Suborder: Polyphaga
- Infraorder: Cucujiformia
- Family: Cerambycidae
- Genus: Moechotypa
- Species: M. javana

Binomial name
- Moechotypa javana Schwarzer, 1929

Species of beetle

Moechotypa javana is a species of beetle in the family Cerambycidae. It was described by Schwarzer in 1929. It is known from Java.
