= Agrococcus =

Scientific classification
- Domain: Bacteria
- Kingdom: Bacillati
- Phylum: Actinomycetota
- Class: Actinomycetes
- Order: Micrococcales
- Family: Microbacteriaceae
- Genus: Agrococcus; Groth et al. 1996

Type species
- Agrococcus jenensis Groth et al. 1996

Species
- See text.

Genus of bacteria

Agrococcus is a genus of gram-positive bacteria the phylum Actinomycetota (Bacteria).

== Etymology ==
The name Agrococcus derives from:
Greek noun agros, field or soil; Neo-Latin masculine gender noun coccus (from Greek masculine gender noun kokkos, grain, seed), coccus; Neo-Latin masculine gender noun Agrococcus a coccus from soil.

A group at the University of British Columbia completed the first draft genome of a bacterium from the genus Agrococcus, which was isolated from modern microbialites found within Pavilion Lake, BC.

== Species ==
The genus contains 9 species, namely

- A. baldri ( Zlamala et al. 2002; Neo-Latin genitive case noun baldri, of Baldr, ancient German god of light, referring to the photochromogenic behavior.)
- A. carbonis (Dhanjal et al. 2010; Latin genitive case noun carbonis of charcoal or coal; referring to the fact it was isolated from the soil of a coal mine.
- A. casei ( Bora et al. 2007,;: Latin genitive case noun casei, of cheese, named because the organism was isolated from smear-ripened cheeses.)
- A. citreus ( Wieser et al. 1999; Latin masculine gender adjective citreus, of or pertaining to the citron-tree; intended to mean lemon-yellow, describing the lemon-yellow pigmentation.)
- A. jejuensis ( Lee 2008; Neo-Latin masculine gender adjective jejuensis, of or belonging to Jeju, Republic of Korea, where the type strain was isolated.)
- A. jenensis ( Groth et al. 1996, (Type species of the genus).; Neo-Latin masculine gender adjective jenensis, of or belonging to the Thuringian town Jena, where the organism was isolated.)
- A. lahaulensis ( Mayilraj et al. 2006; Neo-Latin masculine gender adjective lahaulensis, of or pertaining to Lahaul Valley, located in the Indian Himalayas, where the type strain was isolated.)
- A. pavilionensis (White III et al. 2018; Neo-Latin masculine gender adjective pavilionensis, of or pertaining to Pavilion Lake, located in Southeastern British Columbia, where the type strain was isolated.)
- A. terreus ( Zhang et al. 2010; Latin masculine gender adjective terreus, of earth.)
- A. versicolor ( Behrendt et al. 2008; Latin masculine gender adjective versicolor, colour changing.)

== See also ==
- Bacterial taxonomy
- Microbiology
