= Cnuibacter physcomitrellae =

Scientific classification
- Domain: Bacteria
- Kingdom: Bacillati
- Phylum: Actinomycetota
- Class: Actinomycetia
- Order: Micrococcales
- Family: Microbacteriaceae
- Genus: Cnuibacter; Zhou et al. 2016
- Species: C. physcomitrellae

Binomial name
- Cnuibacter physcomitrellae Zhou et al. 2016

Type strain
- CGMCC 1.15041; DSM 29843; XA

Genus of bacteria

Cnuibacter physcomitrellae is a species of bacteria. Cells are Gram-positive rods, strictly aerobic, non-sporeforming, and non-motile. C. physcomitrellae, was isolated from Physcomitrella patens, or spreading earthmoss. The genus is named after Capital Normal University (CNU) in Beijing, China.
