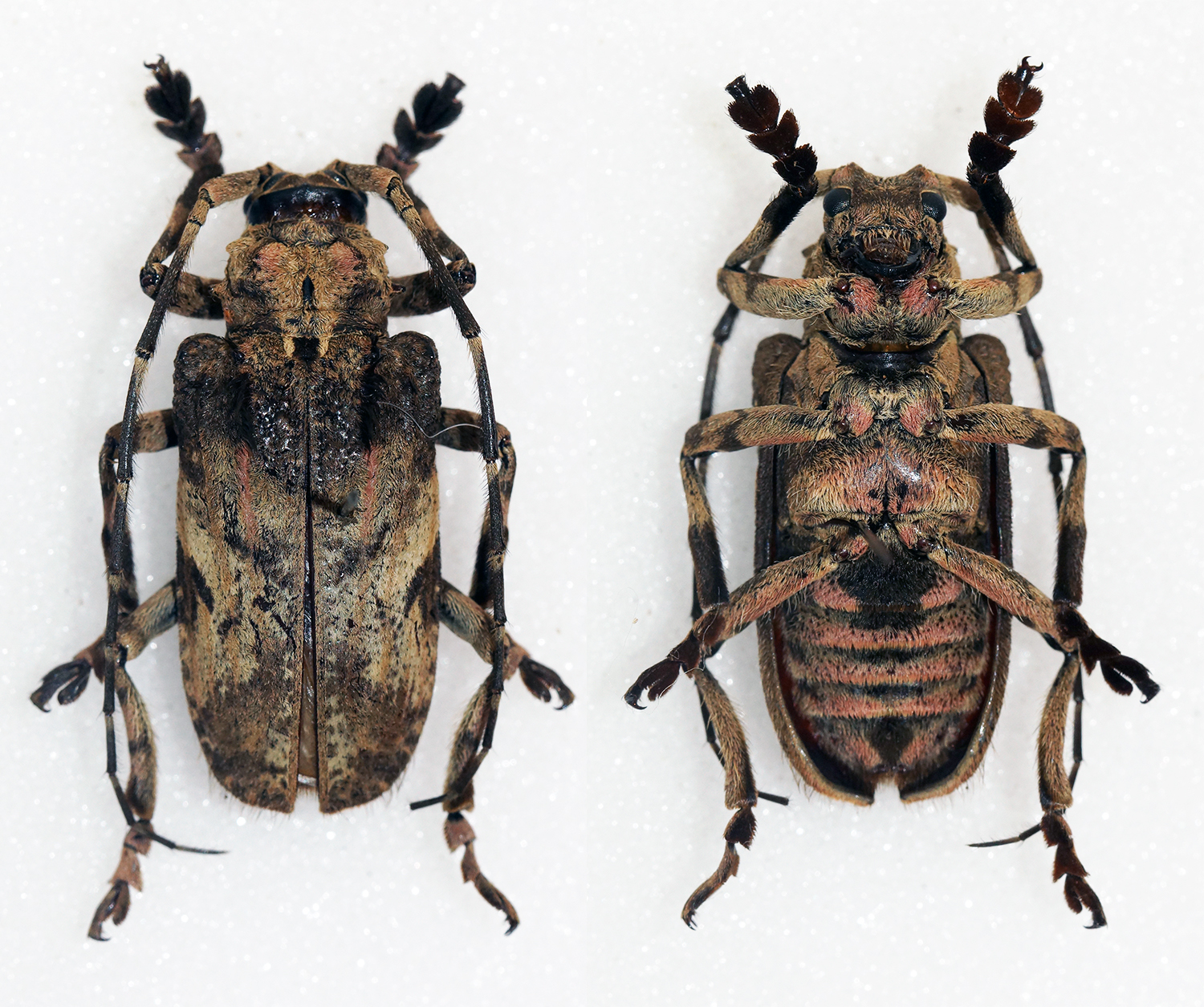
- Moechotypa thoracica

Scientific classification
- Kingdom: Animalia
- Phylum: Arthropoda
- Class: Insecta
- Order: Coleoptera
- Suborder: Polyphaga
- Infraorder: Cucujiformia
- Family: Cerambycidae
- Subfamily: Lamiinae
- Genus: Moechotypa; J. Thomson, 1864

= Moechotypa =

Genus of beetles

Moechotypa is a genus of longhorn beetles of the subfamily Lamiinae.

- Moechotypa adusta Pascoe, 1869
- Moechotypa alboannulata Pic, 1934
- Moechotypa asiatica (Pic, 1903)
- Moechotypa assamensis Breuning, 1936 inq.
- Moechotypa attenuata Pic, 1934
- Moechotypa ceylonica Breuning, 1938
- Moechotypa coomani Pic, 1934
- Moechotypa dalatensis Breuning, 1968
- Moechotypa delicatula (White, 1858)
- Moechotypa diphysis (Pascoe, 1871)
- Moechotypa formosana (Pic, 1917)
- Moechotypa javana Schwarzer, 1929
- Moechotypa jeanvoinei Pic, 1934
- Moechotypa marmorea Pascoe, 1864
- Moechotypa paraformosana Breuning, 1979
- Moechotypa penangensis Breuning, 1973
- Moechotypa semenovi Heyrovsky, 1934
- Moechotypa sikkimensis Breuning, 1936
- Moechotypa strandi Breuning, 1936
- Moechotypa suffusa (Pascoe, 1862)
- Moechotypa thoracica (White, 1858)
- Moechotypa trifasciculata Breuning, 1936
- Moechotypa umbrosa Lacordaire, 1872
- Moechotypa uniformis (Pic, 1922)
