= Frigoribacterium =

Scientific classification
- Domain: Bacteria
- Kingdom: Bacillati
- Phylum: Actinomycetota
- Class: Actinomycetes
- Order: Micrococcales
- Family: Microbacteriaceae
- Genus: Frigoribacterium; Kämpfer et al. 2000

Type species
- Frigoribacterium faeni Kämpfer et al. 2000

Species
- F. endophyticum Wang et al. 2015; F. faeni Kämpfer et al. 2000; F. salinisoli Kong et al. 2016

Genus of bacteria

Frigoribacterium is a Gram-positive, non-spore-forming and motile genus of bacteria from the family Microbacteriaceae.
