= Moechotypa jeanvoinei =

Scientific classification
- Kingdom: Animalia
- Phylum: Arthropoda
- Class: Insecta
- Order: Coleoptera
- Suborder: Polyphaga
- Infraorder: Cucujiformia
- Family: Cerambycidae
- Genus: Moechotypa
- Species: M. jeanvoinei

Binomial name
- Moechotypa jeanvoinei Pic, 1934

Species of beetle

Moechotypa jeanvoinei is a species of beetle in the family Cerambycidae. It was described by Maurice Pic in 1934. It is known from Vietnam.
