= Moechotypa semenovi =

Scientific classification
- Kingdom: Animalia
- Phylum: Arthropoda
- Class: Insecta
- Order: Coleoptera
- Suborder: Polyphaga
- Infraorder: Cucujiformia
- Family: Cerambycidae
- Genus: Moechotypa
- Species: M. semenovi

Binomial name
- Moechotypa semenovi Heyrovsky, 1934

Species of beetle

Moechotypa semenovi is a species of beetle in the family Cerambycidae. It was described by Heyrovský in 1934. It is known from China.
