= Gelidibacter gilvus =

Scientific classification
- Domain: Bacteria
- Kingdom: Pseudomonadati
- Phylum: Bacteroidota
- Class: Flavobacteriia
- Order: Flavobacteriales
- Family: Flavobacteriaceae
- Genus: Gelidibacter
- Species: G. gilvus

Binomial name
- Gelidibacter gilvus Bowman and Nichols 2005

Type strain
- CIP 108531

Species of bacterium

Gelidibacter gilvus is a bacterium from the genus of Gelidibacter.
