= Gulosibacter =

Scientific classification
- Domain: Bacteria
- Kingdom: Bacillati
- Phylum: Actinomycetota
- Class: Actinomycetes
- Order: Micrococcales
- Family: Microbacteriaceae
- Genus: Gulosibacter; Manaia et al. 2004

Type species
- Gulosibacter molinativorax Manaia et al. 2004

Species
- G. bifidus (Lin et al. 2004) Nouioui et al. 2018; G. chungangensis Park et al. 2012; G. faecalis (Lin et al. 2004) Nouioui et al. 2018; G. hominis Vandamme et al. 2022; G. macacae Li et al. 2020; "G. massiliensis" Yacouba et al. 2022; G. molinativorax Manaia et al. 2004; G. sediminis Jiang et al. 2021

Genus of bacteria

Gulosibacter is a Gram-positive, strictly aerobic, non-spore-forming and non-motile genus of bacteria from the family Microbacteriaceae.
