= Moechotypa uniformis =

Scientific classification
- Kingdom: Animalia
- Phylum: Arthropoda
- Class: Insecta
- Order: Coleoptera
- Suborder: Polyphaga
- Infraorder: Cucujiformia
- Family: Cerambycidae
- Genus: Moechotypa
- Species: M. uniformis

Binomial name
- Moechotypa uniformis (Pic, 1922)

Synonyms
- Hecyrida uniformis Pic, 1922

Species of beetle

Moechotypa uniformis is a species of beetle in the family Cerambycidae. It was described by Pic in 1922. It is known from Vietnam.
