= Agreia =

Scientific classification
- Domain: Bacteria
- Kingdom: Bacillati
- Phylum: Actinomycetota
- Class: Actinomycetes
- Order: Micrococcales
- Family: Microbacteriaceae
- Genus: Agreia; Evtushenko et al. 2001

Type species
- Agreia bicolorata Evtushenko et al. 2001

Species
- See text.

Genus of bacteria

Agreia is a genus in the phylum Actinomycetota (Bacteria).

== Etymology ==
The generic name Agreia honours Nina S. Agre, a Russian microbiologist.

== Species ==
The genus contains two species:

- A. bicolorata Evtushenko et al. 2001, type species of the genus; Latin bis, twice; coloratus, coloured; to give bicolorata, two-coloured.)
- A. pratensis (Behrendt et al. 2002) Schumann et al. 2003; Latin pratensis, found in meadows/grassland]

== See also ==
- Bacterial taxonomy
- Microbiology
