= Compostimonas suwonensis =

Scientific classification
- Domain: Bacteria
- Kingdom: Bacillati
- Phylum: Actinomycetota
- Class: Actinomycetes
- Order: Micrococcales
- Family: Microbacteriaceae
- Genus: Compostimonas; Kim et al. 2012
- Species: C. suwonensis

Binomial name
- Compostimonas suwonensis Kim et al. 2012

Type strain
- DSM 25625; KACC 13354; NBRC 106304; SMC 46

Genus of bacteria

Compostimonas suwonensis is a Gram-positive, aerobic and non-motile species of bacteria from the family Microbacteriaceae which has been isolated from spent mushroom compost from Suwon.
