= Moechotypa coomani =

Scientific classification
- Kingdom: Animalia
- Phylum: Arthropoda
- Class: Insecta
- Order: Coleoptera
- Suborder: Polyphaga
- Infraorder: Cucujiformia
- Family: Cerambycidae
- Genus: Moechotypa
- Species: M. coomani

Binomial name
- Moechotypa coomani Pic, 1934

Species of beetle

Moechotypa coomani is a species of beetle in the family Cerambycidae. It was described by Maurice Pic in 1934. It is known from Laos, Cambodia, and Vietnam.
