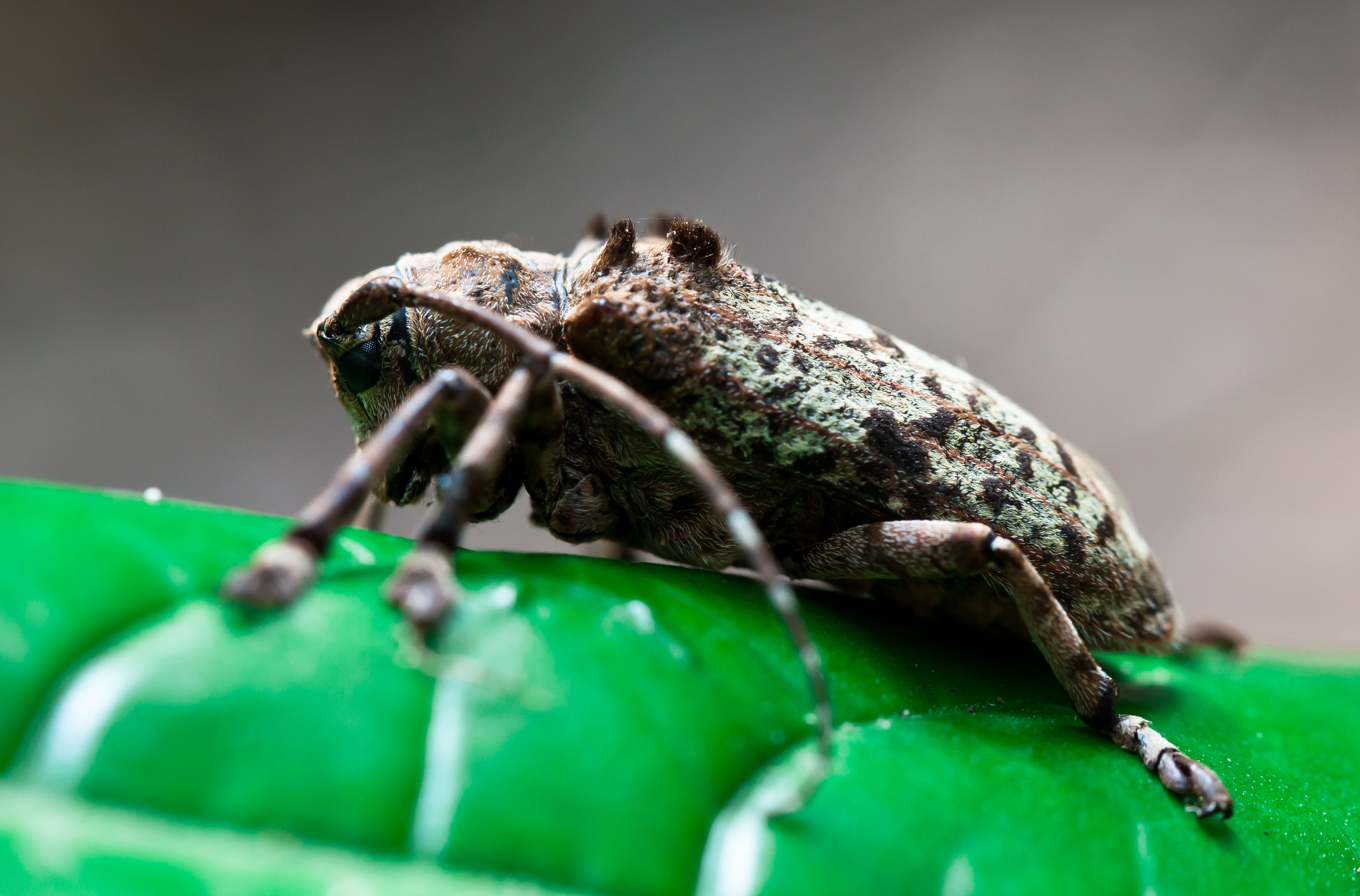

Scientific classification
- Kingdom: Animalia
- Phylum: Arthropoda
- Class: Insecta
- Order: Coleoptera
- Suborder: Polyphaga
- Infraorder: Cucujiformia
- Family: Cerambycidae
- Genus: Moechotypa
- Species: M. delicatula

Binomial name
- Moechotypa delicatula (White, 1858)

Synonyms
- Moechotypa soffusa var. elongata Pic, 1925; Nyphona delicatula White, 1858

= Moechotypa delicatula =

Species of beetle

Moechotypa delicatula is a species of beetle in the family Cerambycidae. It was described by White in 1858. It is known from China, Myanmar, Laos, India, Vietnam, and Sumatra.
