= Parafrigoribacterium mesophilum =

Scientific classification
- Domain: Bacteria
- Kingdom: Bacillati
- Phylum: Actinomycetota
- Class: Actinomycetes
- Order: Micrococcales
- Family: Microbacteriaceae
- Genus: Parafrigoribacterium; Kong et al. 2016
- Species: P. mesophilum

Binomial name
- Parafrigoribacterium mesophilum (Dastager et al. 2008) Kong et al. 2016

Type strain
- DSM 19442; KCTC 19311; MSL-08

Synonyms
- Frigoribacterium mesophilum Dastager et al. 2008

Species of bacteria

Parafrigoribacterium mesophilum is a species of bacteria from the family Microbacteriaceae which has been isolated from soil from the Bigeum Island in Korea.
