= Diaminobutyricimonas aerilata =

Scientific classification
- Domain: Bacteria
- Kingdom: Bacillati
- Phylum: Actinomycetota
- Class: Actinomycetes
- Order: Micrococcales
- Family: Microbacteriaceae
- Genus: Diaminobutyricimonas; Jang et al. 2013
- Species: D. aerilata

Binomial name
- Diaminobutyricimonas aerilata Jang et al. 2013

Type strain
- 6408J-67; DSM 27393; KACC 15518; NBRC 108726

Species of bacteria

Diaminobutyricimonas aerilata is a species of bacteria from the family Microbacteriaceae which has been isolated from air from the Jeju Island.
