= Lacisediminihabitans =

Scientific classification
- Domain: Bacteria
- Kingdom: Bacillati
- Phylum: Actinomycetota
- Class: Actinomycetes
- Order: Micrococcales
- Family: Microbacteriaceae
- Genus: Lacisediminihabitans; Zhuo et al. 2020

Type species
- Lacisediminihabitans profunda

Species
- L. changchengi L. profunda

Genus of bacteria

Lacisediminihabitans is a genus of bacteria from the family of Microbacteriaceae.
