= Frondihabitans =

Scientific classification
- Domain: Bacteria
- Kingdom: Bacillati
- Phylum: Actinomycetota
- Class: Actinomycetes
- Order: Micrococcales
- Family: Microbacteriaceae
- Genus: Frondihabitans; Greene et al. 2009

Type species
- Frondihabitans australicus (Zhang et al. 2007) Greene et al. 2009

Species
- F. australicus (Zhang et al. 2007) Greene et al. 2009; F. cladoniiphilus Cardinale et al. 2011; F. peucedani Lee 2010; F. sucicola Kim et al. 2014

Synonyms
- Frondicola Zhang et al. 2007

Genus of bacteria

Frondihabitans is a Gram-positive, non-spore-forming and non-motil genus of bacteria from the family Microbacteriaceae.
