= Rhodoluna =

Scientific classification
- Domain: Bacteria
- Kingdom: Bacillati
- Phylum: Actinomycetota
- Class: Actinomycetes
- Order: Micrococcales
- Family: Microbacteriaceae
- Genus: Rhodoluna; Hahn et al. 2014

Type species
- Rhodoluna lacicola Hahn et al. 2014

Species
- R. lacicola Hahn et al. 2014; R. limnophila Pitt et al. 2019

Genus of bacteria

Rhodoluna is a Gram-positive, non-spore-forming and non-motile genus of bacteria from the family Microbacteriaceae. The type strain of the only species Rhodoluna lacicola encodes an actinorhodopsin, which is a light-diven proton pump enabling light energy conversion, potentially resulting in a mixotrophic physiology. The type strain of R. lacicola was isolated from Lake Tai (Lake Taihu) in China. The type strain MWH-Ta8 is remarkable for its very small cell size ultramicrobacterium and its small genome size of only 1.4 Mbp. The type strain has a planktonic lifestyle, that is freely floating the water column of aquatic systems. Currently, the genus Rhodoluna contains two described species (R. lacicola and R. limnophila).
