= Diaminobutyricibacter tongyongensis =

Scientific classification
- Domain: Bacteria
- Kingdom: Bacillati
- Phylum: Actinomycetota
- Class: Actinomycetes
- Order: Micrococcales
- Family: Microbacteriaceae
- Genus: Diaminobutyricibacter; Kim et al. 2014
- Species: D. tongyongensis

Binomial name
- Diaminobutyricibacter tongyongensis Kim et al. 2014

Type strain
- KACC 15515; KIS66-7; NBRC 108724

Species of bacteria

Diaminobutyricibacter tongyongensis is a Gram-positive, mesophilic, rod-shaped and motile species of bacteria from the family Microbacteriaceae.
