= Galbibacter =

Scientific classification
- Domain: Bacteria
- Kingdom: Pseudomonadati
- Phylum: Bacteroidota
- Class: Flavobacteriia
- Order: Flavobacteriales
- Family: Flavobacteriaceae
- Genus: Galbibacter; Khan et al. 2007

Species
- G. marinus G. mesophilus

Bacterium

Galbibacter is a genus of bacteria from the family of Flavobacteriaceae.
