= Gelidibacter salicanalis =

Scientific classification
- Domain: Bacteria
- Kingdom: Pseudomonadati
- Phylum: Bacteroidota
- Class: Flavobacteriia
- Order: Flavobacteriales
- Family: Flavobacteriaceae
- Genus: Gelidibacter
- Species: G. salicanalis

Binomial name
- Gelidibacter salicanalis Bowman and Nichols, 2005

Species of bacterium

Gelidibacter salicanalis is a Gram-negative and rod-shaped bacterium from the genus of Gelidibacter.
