= Moechotypa umbrosa =

Scientific classification
- Kingdom: Animalia
- Phylum: Arthropoda
- Class: Insecta
- Order: Coleoptera
- Suborder: Polyphaga
- Infraorder: Cucujiformia
- Family: Cerambycidae
- Genus: Moechotypa
- Species: M. umbrosa

Binomial name
- Moechotypa umbrosa Lacordaire, 1872

Species of beetle

Moechotypa umbrosa is a species of beetle in the family Cerambycidae. It was described by Lacordaire in 1872. It is known from Myanmar, Laos, and Thailand.
