= Moechotypa strandi =

Scientific classification
- Kingdom: Animalia
- Phylum: Arthropoda
- Class: Insecta
- Order: Coleoptera
- Suborder: Polyphaga
- Infraorder: Cucujiformia
- Family: Cerambycidae
- Genus: Moechotypa
- Species: M. strandi

Binomial name
- Moechotypa strandi Breuning, 1936

Species of beetle

Moechotypa strandi is a species of beetle in the family Cerambycidae. It was described by Stephan von Breuning in 1936. It is found in Vietnam.
