= Aurantimicrobium =

Scientific classification
- Domain: Bacteria
- Kingdom: Bacillati
- Phylum: Actinomycetota
- Class: Actinomycetes
- Order: Micrococcales
- Family: Microbacteriaceae
- Genus: Aurantimicrobium; Nakai et al. 2015

Type species
- Aurantimicrobium minutum Nakai et al. 2015

Species
- A. minutum Nakai et al. 2015; A. photophilum Hahn et al. 2021

Genus of bacteria

Aurantimicrobium is a Gram-positive, aerobic and non-motile genus of bacteria from the family Microbacteriaceae. Aurantimicrobium minutum has been isolated from water of a river in Japan.
