= Moechotypa alboannulata =

Scientific classification
- Kingdom: Animalia
- Phylum: Arthropoda
- Class: Insecta
- Order: Coleoptera
- Suborder: Polyphaga
- Infraorder: Cucujiformia
- Family: Cerambycidae
- Genus: Moechotypa
- Species: M. alboannulata

Binomial name
- Moechotypa alboannulata Pic, 1934

Synonyms
- Moechotypa albomaculata (Pic) Hua, Hajime, Samuelson & Lingafelter, 2009 (misspelling)

Species of beetle

Moechotypa alboannulata is a species of beetle in the family Cerambycidae. It was described by Pic in 1934. It is known from China.
