= Glaciihabitans =

Scientific classification
- Domain: Bacteria
- Kingdom: Bacillati
- Phylum: Actinomycetota
- Class: Actinomycetes
- Order: Micrococcales
- Family: Microbacteriaceae
- Genus: Glaciihabitans; Li et al. 2014

Type species
- Glaciihabitans tibetensis Li et al. 2014

Species
- G. arcticus Dahal and Kim 2019; G. tibetensis Li et al. 2014

Genus of bacteria

Glaciihabitans is a genus of bacteria from the family Microbacteriaceae.
