= Mycetocola =

Scientific classification
- Domain: Bacteria
- Kingdom: Bacillati
- Phylum: Actinomycetota
- Class: Actinomycetes
- Order: Micrococcales
- Family: Microbacteriaceae
- Genus: Mycetocola; Tsukamoto et al. 2001

Type species
- Mycetocola saprophilus Tsukamoto et al. 2001

Species
- M. lacteus Tsukamoto et al. 2001; M. manganoxydans Luo et al. 2012; M. miduiensis Zhu et al. 2013; M. reblochoni Bora et al. 2008; M. saprophilus Tsukamoto et al. 2001; M. spongiae Chen et al. 2022; M. tolaasinivorans Tsukamoto et al. 2001; M. zhadangensis Shen et al. 2013; M. zhujimingii Li et al. 2019

Genus of bacteria

Mycetocola is a Gram-positive non-spore-forming and non-motile genus from the family of Microbacteriaceae.
