= Gelidibacter sediminis =

Scientific classification
- Domain: Bacteria
- Kingdom: Pseudomonadati
- Phylum: Bacteroidota
- Class: Flavobacteriia
- Order: Flavobacteriales
- Family: Flavobacteriaceae
- Genus: Gelidibacter
- Species: G. sediminis

Binomial name
- Gelidibacter sediminis Zhang and Margesin, 2015

Type strain
- S11-41

Species of bacterium

Gelidibacter sediminis is a Gram-negative and rod-shaped bacterium from the genus of Gelidibacter which has been isolated from sediments from the Yellow Sea.
