= Cryobacterium luteum =

Scientific classification
- Domain: Bacteria
- Kingdom: Bacillati
- Phylum: Actinomycetota
- Class: Actinomycetes
- Order: Micrococcales
- Family: Microbacteriaceae
- Genus: Cryobacterium
- Species: C. luteum

Binomial name
- Cryobacterium luteum Liu et al. 2012

Type strain
- CGMCC 1.11210; Hh15; Hh40-2

Species of bacterium

Cryobacterium luteum is a Gram-positive and rod-shaped bacterium from the genus Cryobacterium which has been isolated from glacier ice from a glacier from the Xinjiang Uyghur Autonomous Region in China.
