= Okibacterium =

Scientific classification
- Domain: Bacteria
- Kingdom: Bacillati
- Phylum: Actinomycetota
- Class: Actinomycetes
- Order: Micrococcales
- Family: Microbacteriaceae
- Genus: Okibacterium; Evtushenko et al. 2002

Type species
- Okibacterium fritillariae Evtushenko et al. 2002

Species
- O. endophyticum Wang et al. 2015; O. fritillariae Evtushenko et al. 2002

Genus of bacteria

Okibacterium is a Gram-positive and non-spore-forming genus of bacteria from the family Microbacteriaceae.
