= H15 =

H15, H.15 or H-15 may refer to:

- H-15 (Michigan county highway), a road in the United States
- Highway H15 (Ukraine), a road in Ukraine
- British NVC community H15, a type of heath community in the British National Vegetation Classification
- HMS Esk (H15), a 1934 British Royal Navy E class destroyer
- HMS Raider (H15), a World War II British Royal Navy R class destroyer
- LSWR H15 class, a 1914 British class of steam locomotives
- Federal Reserve Statistical Release H.15
