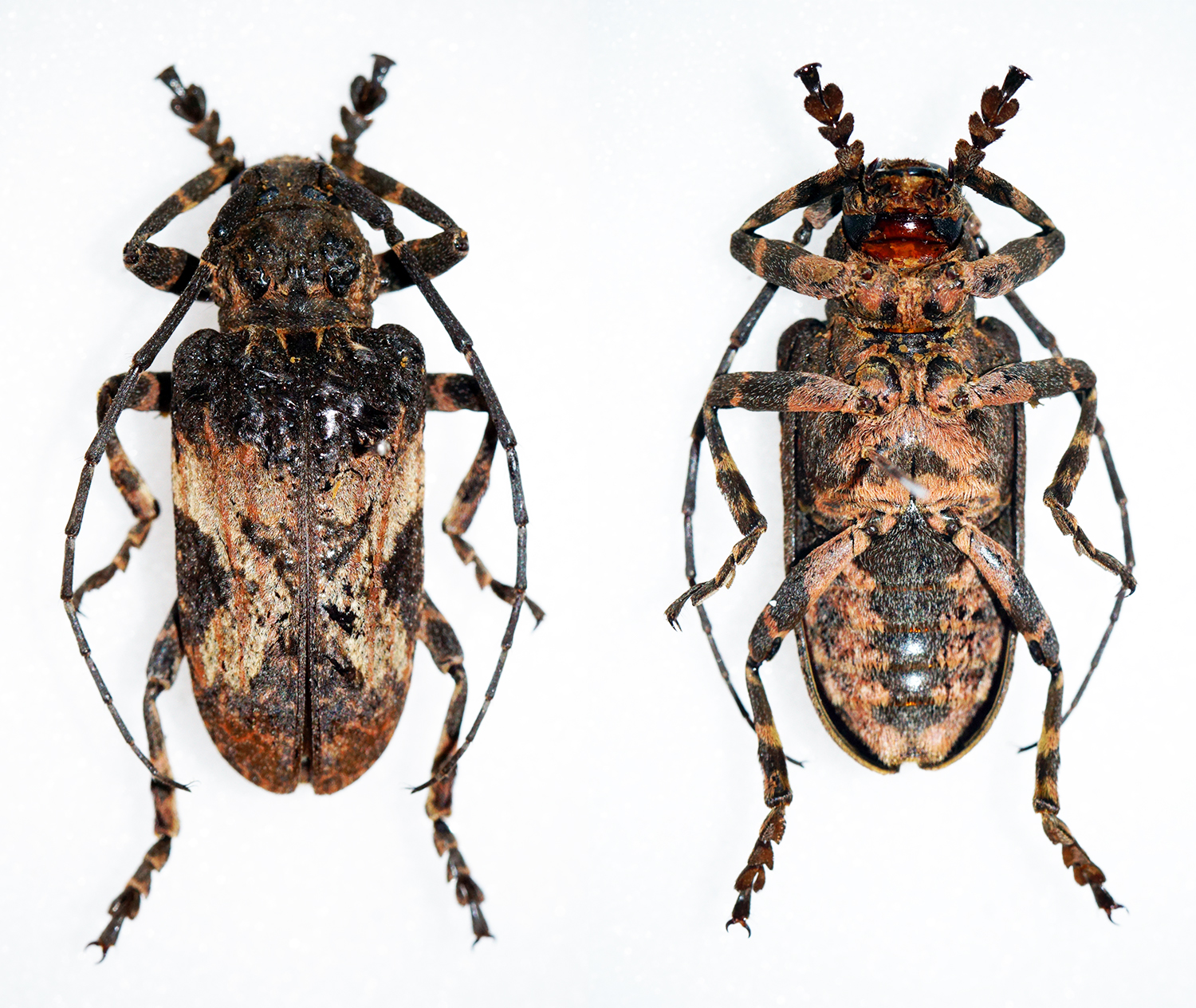

Scientific classification
- Kingdom: Animalia
- Phylum: Arthropoda
- Class: Insecta
- Order: Coleoptera
- Suborder: Polyphaga
- Infraorder: Cucujiformia
- Family: Cerambycidae
- Genus: Moechotypa
- Species: M. asiatica

Binomial name
- Moechotypa asiatica (Pic, 1903)

Synonyms
- Hecyra asiatica (Pic) Auct. ?; Hecyrida asiatica Pic, 1903

= Moechotypa asiatica =

Species of beetle

Moechotypa asiatica is a species of beetle in the family Cerambycidae. It was described by Maurice Pic in 1903. It is known from China, Myanmar, India, Thailand, Vietnam, and Laos.
