= Galbibacter marinus =

Scientific classification
- Domain: Bacteria
- Kingdom: Pseudomonadati
- Phylum: Bacteroidota
- Class: Flavobacteriia
- Order: Flavobacteriales
- Family: Flavobacteriaceae
- Genus: Galbibacter
- Species: G. marinus

Binomial name
- Galbibacter marinus Li et al. 2013

Type strain
- ck-I2-15

Bacterium

Galbibacter marinus is a Gram-negative, rod-shaped moderately halophilic and non-motile bacterium from the genus of Galbibacter which has been isolated from deep-sea sediments from the Indian Ocean Ridge. Galbibacter marinus has the ability to denitrification.
