= Glaciibacter =

Scientific classification
- Domain: Bacteria
- Kingdom: Bacillati
- Phylum: Actinomycetota
- Class: Actinomycetes
- Order: Micrococcales
- Family: Microbacteriaceae
- Genus: Glaciibacter; Katayama et al. 2009

Type species
- Glaciibacter superstes Katayama et al. 2009

Species
- "G. flavus" An et al. 2021; G. superstes Katayama et al. 2009

Genus of bacteria

Glaciibacter is a psychrophilic genus of bacteria from the family Microbacteriaceae. The type species, Glaciibacter superstes, has been isolated from ice from the permafrost tunnel in Fox, Alaska.
