= Marisediminicola =

Scientific classification
- Domain: Bacteria
- Kingdom: Bacillati
- Phylum: Actinomycetota
- Class: Actinomycetes
- Order: Micrococcales
- Family: Microbacteriaceae
- Genus: Marisediminicola; Li et al. 2010

Type species
- Marisediminicola antarctica Li et al. 2010

Species
- M. antarctica Li et al. 2010; M. senii Jani et al. 2021

Genus of bacteria

Marisediminicola is a genus of bacteria from the family of Microbacteriaceae. The type species, Marisediminicola antarctica, has been isolated from marine sediments from the Zhongshan Station in Antarctica.
