= Moechotypa adusta =

Scientific classification
- Kingdom: Animalia
- Phylum: Arthropoda
- Class: Insecta
- Order: Coleoptera
- Suborder: Polyphaga
- Infraorder: Cucujiformia
- Family: Cerambycidae
- Genus: Moechotypa
- Species: M. adusta

Binomial name
- Moechotypa adusta Pascoe, 1869

Synonyms
- Moechotypa insulcata Pic, 1926

Species of beetle

Moechotypa adusta is a species of beetle in the family Cerambycidae. It was described by Pascoe in 1869. It is known from Cambodia, Vietnam, Laos, and Thailand.
