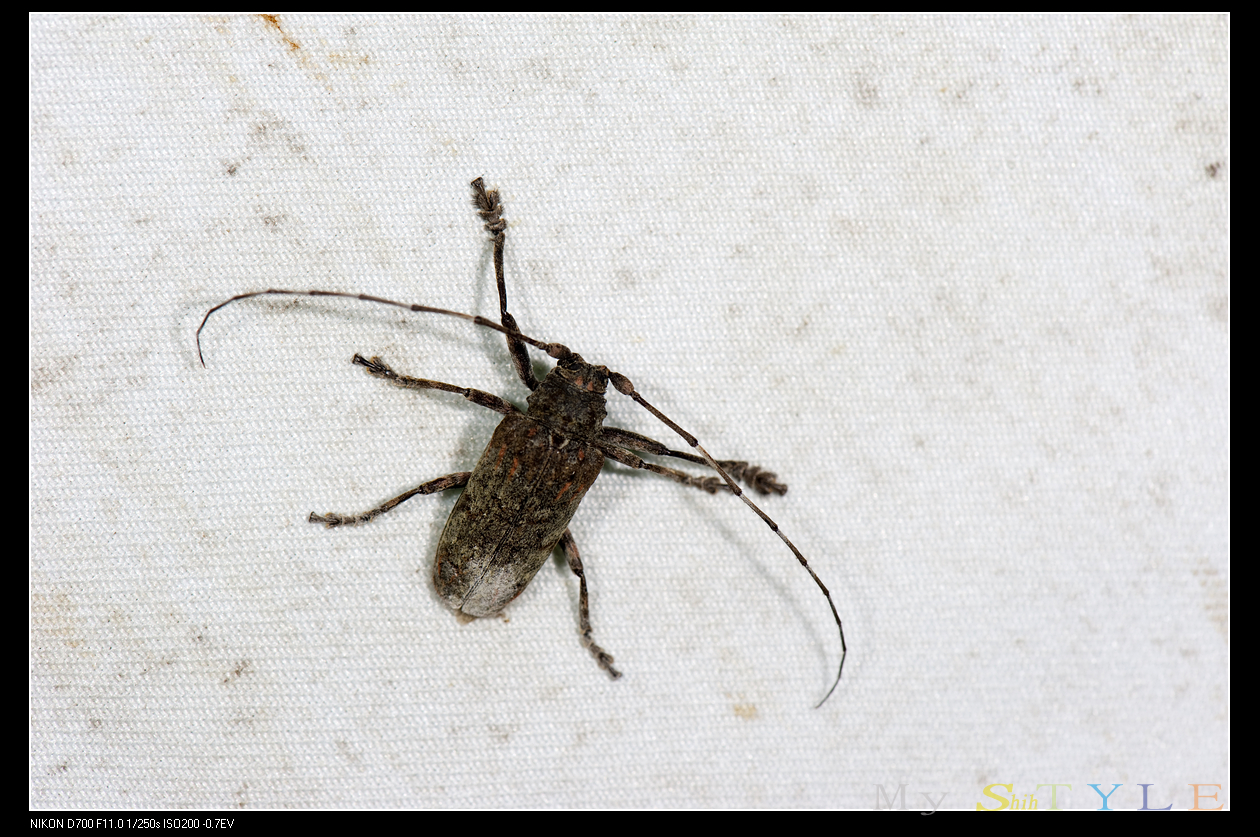

Scientific classification
- Kingdom: Animalia
- Phylum: Arthropoda
- Class: Insecta
- Order: Coleoptera
- Suborder: Polyphaga
- Infraorder: Cucujiformia
- Family: Cerambycidae
- Genus: Moechotypa
- Species: M. formosana

Binomial name
- Moechotypa formosana (Pic, 1917)

Synonyms
- Hecyrida formosana Pic, 1917; Moechotypa delicatula formosana (Pic); Moechotypa thoracica formosana (Pic) Schwarzer, 1925

= Moechotypa formosana =

Species of beetle

Moechotypa formosana is a species of beetle in the family Cerambycidae. It was described by Maurice Pic in 1917. It is known from Taiwan.
