= Labedella =

Scientific classification
- Domain: Bacteria
- Kingdom: Bacillati
- Phylum: Actinomycetota
- Class: Actinomycetes
- Order: Micrococcales
- Family: Microbacteriaceae
- Genus: Labedella; Lee 2007

Type species
- Labedella gwakjiensis Lee 2007

Species
- L. endophytica Wang et al. 2015; L. gwakjiensis Lee 2007; L. phragmitis Li et al. 2020; L. populi Li et al. 2020

Genus of bacteria

Labedella is a Gram-positive, non-spore-forming, aerobic and non-motile genus of bacteria from the family Microbacteriaceae. Labedella is named after David P. Labeda.
