= Rhodoglobus =

Scientific classification
- Domain: Bacteria
- Kingdom: Bacillati
- Phylum: Actinomycetota
- Class: Actinomycetes
- Order: Micrococcales
- Family: Microbacteriaceae
- Genus: Rhodoglobus; Sheridan et al. 2003

Type species
- Rhodoglobus vestalii Sheridan et al. 2003

Species
- R. aureus (Reddy et al. 2003) An et al. 2011; R. vestalii Sheridan et al. 2003

Genus of bacteria

Rhodoglobus is a Gram-positive, non-spore-forming and aerobic genus of bacteria from the family Microbacteriaceae.
