= Cryobacterium =

Scientific classification
- Domain: Bacteria
- Kingdom: Bacillati
- Phylum: Actinomycetota
- Class: Actinomycetes
- Order: Micrococcales
- Family: Microbacteriaceae
- Genus: Cryobacterium; Suzuki et al. 1997

Type species
- Cryobacterium psychrophilum (ex Inoue and Komagata 1976) Suzuki et al. 1997

Species
- C. arcticum Bajerski et al. 2011; C. aureum Liu et al. 2018; C. breve Liu et al. 2020; C. flavum Liu et al. 2012; C. levicorallinum Liu et al. 2013; C. luteum Liu et al. 2012; C. mesophilum Liu et al. 2019; C. psychrophilum (ex Inoue and Komagata 1976) Suzuki et al. 1997; C. psychrotolerans Zhang et al. 2007; C. roopkundense Reddy et al. 2010; C. ruanii Liu et al. 2020; C. soli Gong et al. 2020; C. tepidiphilum Wang et al. 2020; C. zongtaii Liu et al. 2019

Genus of bacteria

Cryobacterium is a Gram-positive and strictly aerobic bacterial genus from the family Microbacteriaceae.
