= Alpinimonas psychrophila =

Scientific classification
- Domain: Bacteria
- Kingdom: Bacillati
- Phylum: Actinomycetota
- Class: Actinomycetes
- Order: Micrococcales
- Family: Microbacteriaceae
- Genus: Alpinimonas; Schumann et al. 2012
- Species: A. psychrophila

Binomial name
- Alpinimonas psychrophila Schumann et al. 2012

Type strain
- Cr8-25; DSM 23737; LMG 26215

Genus of bacteria

Alpinimonas psychrophila is a psychrophilic, non-motile, Gram-positive and Gram-variable species of bacteria from the family of Microbacteriaceae which has been isolated from cryoconite of an alpine glacier.
