= Leucobacter =

Scientific classification
- Domain: Bacteria
- Kingdom: Bacillati
- Phylum: Actinomycetota
- Class: Actinomycetes
- Order: Micrococcales
- Family: Microbacteriaceae
- Genus: Leucobacter; Takeuchi et al. 1996

Type species
- Leucobacter komagatae Takeuchi et al. 1996

Species
- See text.

Genus of bacteria

Leucobacter is a bacterial genus from the family Microbacteriaceae.

== Species ==
Leucobacter comprises the following species:

- L. aerolatus Martin et al. 2010
- L. albus Lin et al. 2004
- L. alluvii Morais et al. 2006
- L. aridicollis Morais et al. 2005
- L. celer Shin et al. 2011
- L. chironomi Halpern et al. 2009
- L. chromiireducens Morais et al. 2005
- L. chromiiresistens Sturm et al. 2011
- L. chromiisoli Xu et al. 2021
- L. coleopterorum Hyun et al. 2022
- L. corticis Li et al. 2017
- L. denitrificans Weon et al. 2012
- "L. epilobiisoli" Hou et al. 2018
- L. exalbidus Ue 2011
- L. holotrichiae Zhu et al. 2016
- "L. humi" Her and Lee 2015
- L. iarius Somvanshi et al. 2007
- L. insecticola Hyun et al. 2022
- L. japonicus (Clark and Hodgkin 2015) Nouioui et al. 2018
- L. komagatae Takeuchi et al. 1996
- "L. kyeonggiensis" Kim and Lee 2011
- L. luti Morais et al. 2006
- "L. margaritiformis" Lee and Lee 2012
- "L. massiliensis" Leangapichart et al. 2018
- L. muris Benga et al. 2019
- L. musarum Clark and Hodgkin 2015
- L. populi Fang et al. 2016
- L. ruminantium Chun et al. 2017
- L. salsicius Yun et al. 2011
- L. soli Kämpfer et al. 2021
- "Ca. L. sulfonamidivorax" corrig. Reis et al. 2019
- L. tardus Behrendt et al. 2008
- L. triazinivorans Sun et al. 2018
- "L. tropicalis" Liu et al. 1999
- L. viscericola Hyun et al. 2022
- L. weissii Schumann and Pukall 2017
- L. zeae Lai et al. 2015
