= Schumannella =

Scientific classification
- Domain: Bacteria
- Kingdom: Bacillati
- Phylum: Actinomycetota
- Class: Actinomycetes
- Order: Micrococcales
- Family: Microbacteriaceae
- Genus: Schumannella; An et al. 2009

Type species
- Schumannella luteola An et al. 2009

Species
- Schumannella luteola An et al. 2009; "Schumannella soli" Li et al. 2021

Genus of bacteria

Schumannella is a Gram-positive, anaerobic, rod-shaped and non-motile genus of bacteria from the family Microbacteriaceae. Schumannella is named after the German microbiologist P. Schumann. Schumannella luteola has been isolated from lichen from Tokyo in Japan.
