= Herbiconiux =

Scientific classification
- Domain: Bacteria
- Kingdom: Bacillati
- Phylum: Actinomycetota
- Class: Actinomycetes
- Order: Micrococcales
- Family: Microbacteriaceae
- Genus: Herbiconiux; Behrendt et al. 2011

Type species
- Herbiconiux ginsengi (Qiu et al. 2007) Behrendt et al. 2011

Species
- H. flava Hamada et al. 2012; H. ginsengi (Qiu et al. 2007) Behrendt et al. 2011; H. moechotypicola Kim et al. 2012; H. solani Behrendt et al. 2011

Genus of bacteria

Herbiconiux is a Gram-positive, non-spore-forming, endophytic, obligatory aerobic and non-motile genus of bacteria from the family Microbacteriaceae.
