= Cryocola antiquus =

Scientific classification
- Domain: Bacteria
- Kingdom: Bacillati
- Phylum: Actinomycetota
- Class: Actinomycetes
- Order: Micrococcales
- Family: Microbacteriaceae
- Genus: "Cryocola"; Gavrish et al. 2003
- Species: C. antiquus

Binomial name
- Cryocola antiquus Gavrish et al. 2003

Genus of bacteria

"Cryocola antiquus" is a species of bacteria from the family of Microbacteriaceae. "Cryocola antiquus" has been isolated from subarctic tundra soil.
