= Galbitalea soli =

Scientific classification
- Domain: Bacteria
- Kingdom: Bacillati
- Phylum: Actinomycetota
- Class: Actinomycetes
- Order: Micrococcales
- Family: Microbacteriaceae
- Genus: Galbitalea; Kim et al. 2014
- Species: G. soli

Binomial name
- Galbitalea soli Kim et al. 2014

Type strain
- KACC 15520; KIS82-1; NBRC 108727

Genus of bacteria

Galbitalea is a genus of bacteria from the family of Microbacteriaceae which has been isolated from the sap of the tree Acer mono in Korea.
