= Subtercola =

Scientific classification
- Domain: Bacteria
- Kingdom: Bacillati
- Phylum: Actinomycetota
- Class: Actinomycetes
- Order: Micrococcales
- Family: Microbacteriaceae
- Genus: Subtercola; Männistö et al. 2000

Type species
- Subtercola boreus Männistö et al. 2000

Species
- S. boreus Männistö et al. 2000; S. frigoramans Männistö et al. 2000; S. lobariae Si et al. 2017; S. vilae Villalobos et al. 2018

Genus of bacteria

Subtercola is a Gram-positive, non-spore-forming, aerobic and non-motile genus of bacteria from the family Microbacteriaceae.
