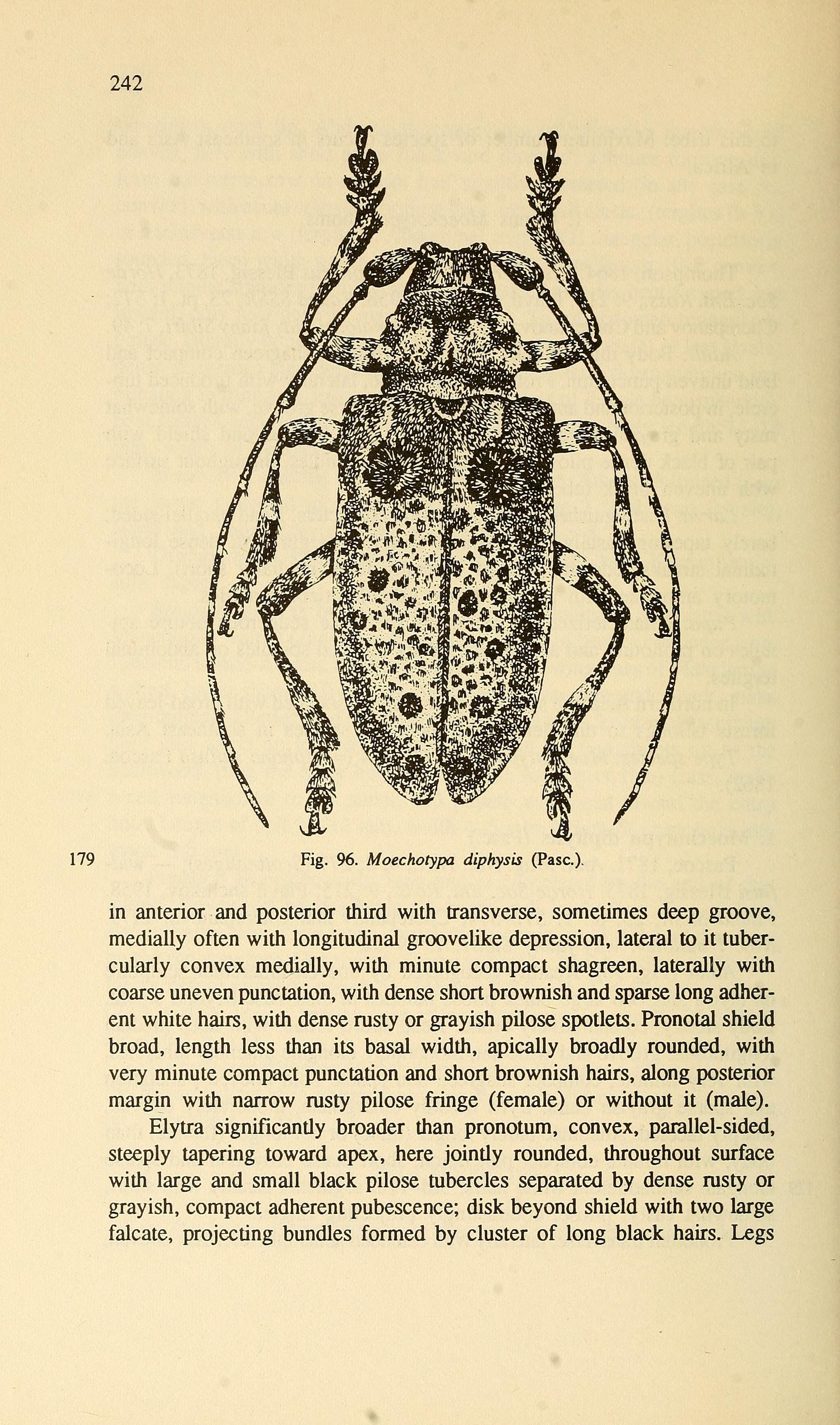

Scientific classification
- Kingdom: Animalia
- Phylum: Arthropoda
- Class: Insecta
- Order: Coleoptera
- Suborder: Polyphaga
- Infraorder: Cucujiformia
- Family: Cerambycidae
- Genus: Moechotypa
- Species: M. diphysis

Binomial name
- Moechotypa diphysis (Pascoe, 1871)

Synonyms
- Moechotypa davidis Fairmaire, 1887; Moechotypa fuliginosa Kolbe, 1886; Scotinauges diphysis Pascoe, 1871; Tylophorus wulffiusi Blessig, 1873

= Moechotypa diphysis =

Species of beetle

Moechotypa diphysis is a species of beetle in the family Cerambycidae. It was described by Pascoe in 1871. It is known from Russia, China, Japan, North Korea, and South Korea. It feeds on plants such as Ailanthus altissima, Juglans regia, Zanthoxylum simulans, and Quercus glauca.
