= Galbibacter mesophilus =

Scientific classification
- Domain: Bacteria
- Kingdom: Pseudomonadati
- Phylum: Bacteroidota
- Class: Flavobacteriia
- Order: Flavobacteriales
- Family: Flavobacteriaceae
- Genus: Galbibacter
- Species: G. mesophilus

Binomial name
- Galbibacter mesophilus Khan et al. 2007

Type strain
- Mok-17

Bacterium

Galbibacter mesophilus is a Gram-negative and rod-shaped bacterium from the genus of Galbibacter which has been isolated from sediments from the Okinawa Island in Japan.
