= Leifsonia =

Scientific classification
- Domain: Bacteria
- Kingdom: Bacillati
- Phylum: Actinomycetota
- Class: Actinomycetes
- Order: Micrococcales
- Family: Microbacteriaceae
- Genus: Leifsonia; Evtushenko et al. 2000

Type species
- Leifsonia aquatica (ex Leifson 1962) Evtushenko et al. 2000

Species
- L. antarctica Pindi et al. 2009; L. aquatica (ex Leifson 1962) Evtushenko et al. 2000; L. bigeumensis Dastager et al. 2008; "L. flava" Cai et al. 2018; L. kafniensis Pindi et al. 2009; L. lichenia An et al. 2010; L. naganoensis Suzuki et al. 2000; L. poae Evtushenko et al. 2000; L. psychrotolerans Ganzert et al. 2011; L. rubra Reddy et al. 2003; L. shinshuensis Suzuki et al. 2000; L. soli Madhaiyan et al. 2010; L. xyli (Davis et al. 1984) Evtushenko et al. 2000

Genus of bacteria

Leifsonia is a genus of Gram-positive bacteria from the family Microbacteriaceae.
