= Antarcticimonas =

Scientific classification
- Domain: Bacteria
- Kingdom: Pseudomonadati
- Phylum: Bacteroidota
- Class: Flavobacteriia
- Order: Flavobacteriales
- Family: Flavobacteriaceae
- Genus: Antarcticimonas; Yang et al. 2014

Type species
- Antarcticimonas flava

Species
- A. flava

Genus of bacteria

Antarcticimonas is a Gram-negative, obligately aerobic and rod-shaped genus of bacteria from the family of Flavobacteriaceae with one known species (Antarcticimonas flava). Antarcticimonas flava has been isolated from seawater from the coast of the Antarctic.
