= Federal Reserve Statistical Release H.15 =

Weekly publication of US market interest rates

The United States Federal Reserve Statistical Release H.15 is a weekly publication (with daily updates) of the Federal Reserve System of selected market interest rates.

== Published rates ==
The current H.15 release covers federal funds, commercial paper, the bank prime loan rate, the discount-window primary credit rate, Treasury bills, and nominal and inflation-indexed Treasury constant-maturity yields.
