= Streptomyces mesophilus =

Scientific classification
- Domain: Bacteria
- Kingdom: Bacillati
- Phylum: Actinomycetota
- Class: Actinomycetia
- Order: Streptomycetales
- Family: Streptomycetaceae
- Genus: Streptomyces
- Species: S. mesophilus

Binomial name
- Streptomyces mesophilus Tokatli et al. 2021

Type strain
- YC419

Species of bacterium

Streptomyces mesophilus is a bacterium species from the genus of Streptomyces which has been isolated from sediments of the Lake Yeniçağa in the Bolu Province.

== See also ==
- List of Streptomyces species
