= Terrimesophilobacter mesophilus =

Scientific classification
- Domain: Bacteria
- Kingdom: Bacillati
- Phylum: Actinomycetota
- Class: Actinomycetes
- Order: Micrococcales
- Family: Microbacteriaceae
- Genus: Terrimesophilobacter; Hahn et al. 2021
- Species: T. mesophilus

Binomial name
- Terrimesophilobacter mesophilus (Dastager et al. 2008) Hahn et al. 2021

Type strain
- MSL-15; DSM 19267; JCM 16539; KCTC 19270

Synonyms
- Cryobacterium mesophilum Dastager et al. 2008

Species of bacterium

Terrimesophilobacter mesophilus is a Gram-positive, aerobic, mesophilic and motile bacterium from the genus of Terrimesophilobacter which has been isolated from soil from a field from Bigeum Island in Korea.
