= Gelidibacter mesophilus =

Scientific classification
- Domain: Bacteria
- Kingdom: Pseudomonadati
- Phylum: Bacteroidota
- Class: Flavobacteriia
- Order: Flavobacteriales
- Family: Flavobacteriaceae
- Genus: Gelidibacter
- Species: G. mesophilus

Binomial name
- Gelidibacter mesophilus Macián et al. 2002

Type strain
- 2SM29

Species of bacterium

Gelidibacter mesophilus is a Gram-negative, aerobic and heterotrophic bacterium from the genus of Gelidibacter which has been isolated from seawater from the Mediterranean Sea.
