= Arenivirga flava =

Scientific classification
- Domain: Bacteria
- Kingdom: Bacillati
- Phylum: Actinomycetota
- Class: Actinomycetes
- Order: Micrococcales
- Family: Microbacteriaceae
- Genus: Arenivirga; Hamada et al. 2017
- Species: A. flava

Binomial name
- Arenivirga flava Hamada et al. 2017

Type strain
- HIs16-32; NBRC 112289; TBRC 7038

Genus of bacteria

Arenivirga flava is a Gram-positive, rod-shaped, non-endospore-forming and non-motile species of bacteria from the family of Microbacteriaceae.
