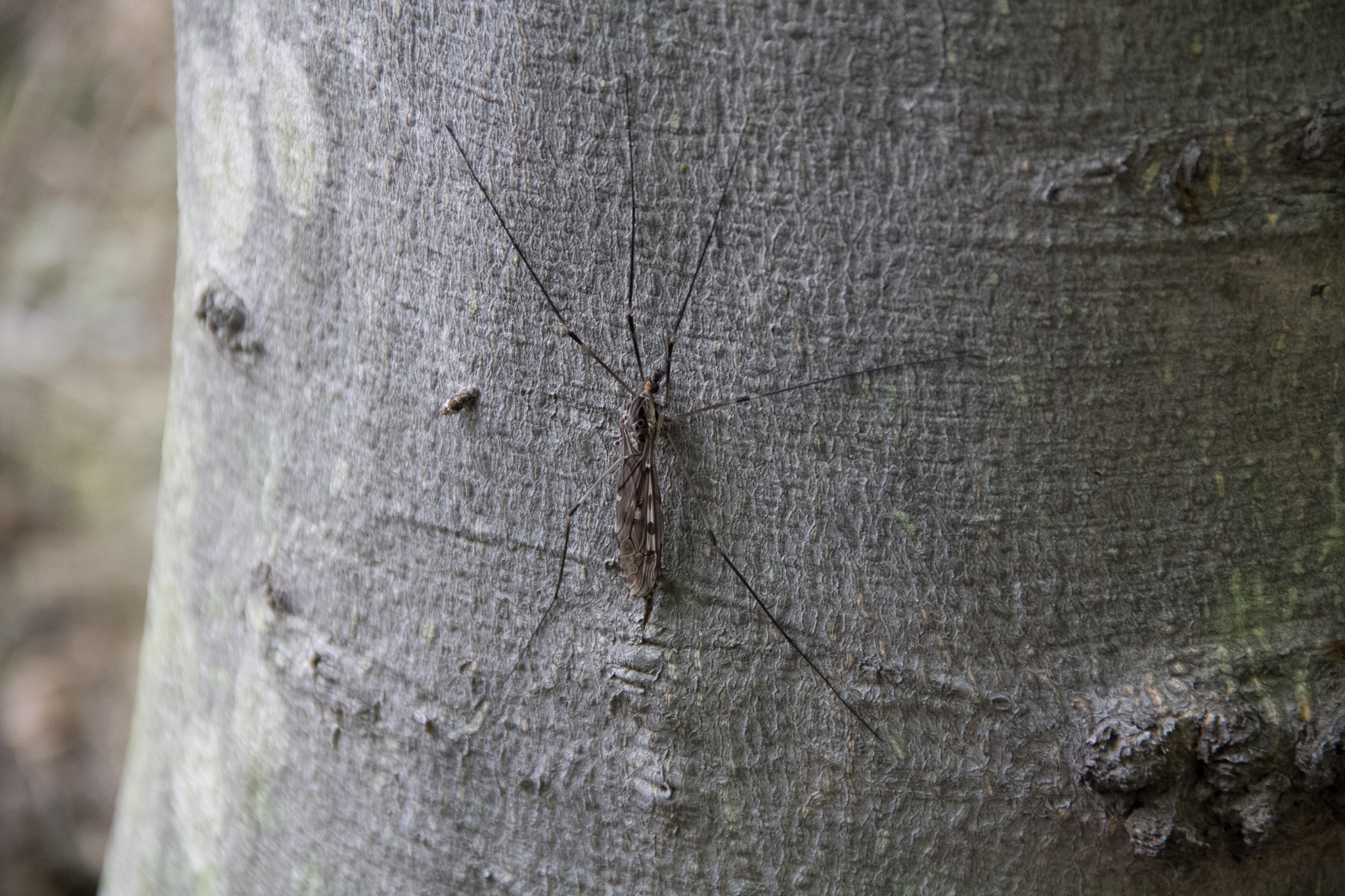
- Tipula abdominalis in Guilford Township, Ohio

Scientific classification
- Kingdom: Animalia
- Phylum: Arthropoda
- Clade: Pancrustacea
- Class: Insecta
- Order: Diptera
- Family: Tipulidae
- Genus: Tipula
- Subgenus: Nippotipula
- Species: T. abdominalis

Binomial name
- Tipula abdominalis Say

Synonyms
- Ctenophora abdominalis Say, 1823; Tipula albilata Walker, 1848

= Tipula abdominalis =

Species of fly

Tipula abdominalis, the giant crane fly, is a species of large crane flies in the family Tipulidae. T. abdominalis lives in riparian aquatic habitats as a larva, feeding on leaf litter digested by their hind gut microbiota.
