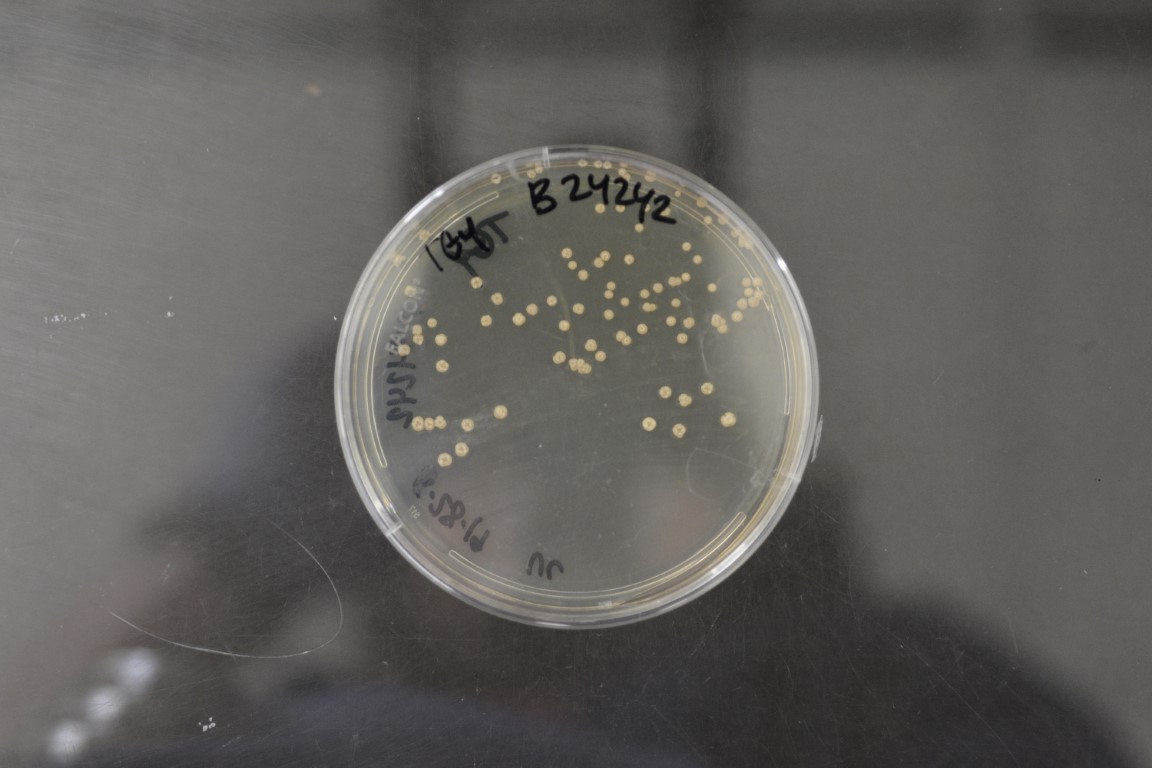
- Microbacterium gubbeenense on agar plate

Scientific classification
- Domain: Bacteria
- Kingdom: Bacillati
- Phylum: Actinomycetota
- Class: Actinomycetes
- Order: Micrococcales
- Family: Microbacteriaceae; Park et al. 1995

Type genus
- Microbacterium Orla-Jensen 1919 (Approved Lists 1980)

Genera
- See text.

= Microbacteriaceae =

Family of bacteria

Microbacteriaceae is a family of bacteria of the order Actinomycetales. They are Gram-positive soil organisms.

== Genera ==
The family Microbacteriaceae comprises the following genera:

- Agreia Evtushenko et al. 2001
- Agrococcus Groth et al. 1996
- Agromyces Gledhill and Casida 1969 (Approved Lists 1980)
- Allohumibacter Kim et al. 2016
- Alpinimonas Schumann et al. 2012
- Amnibacterium Kim and Lee 2011
- Arenivirga Hamada et al. 2017
- Aurantimicrobium Nakai et al. 2015
- Canibacter Aravena-Román et al. 2014
- Clavibacter Davis et al. 1984
- Cnuibacter Zhou et al. 2016
- Compostimonas Kim et al. 2012
- Conyzicola Kim et al. 2014
- "Crocebacterium" Rogers & Doran-Peterson 2006
- Cryobacterium Suzuki et al. 1997
- "Cryocola" Gavrish et al. 2003
- Curtobacterium Yamada and Komagata 1972 (Approved Lists 1980)
- Diaminobutyricibacter Kim et al. 2014
- Diaminobutyricimonas Jang et al. 2013
- Frigoribacterium Kämpfer et al. 2000
- Frondihabitans Greene et al. 2009
- Galbitalea Kim et al. 2014
- Glaciibacter Katayama et al. 2009
- Glaciihabitans Li et al. 2014
- Gryllotalpicola Kim et al. 2012
- Gulosibacter Manaia et al. 2004
- Herbiconiux Behrendt et al. 2011
- Homoserinibacter Kim et al. 2014
- Homoserinimonas Kim et al. 2012
- Huakuichenia Zhang et al. 2016
- Humibacter Vaz-Moreira et al. 2008
- Klugiella Cook et al. 2008
- Labedella Lee 2007
- Lacisediminihabitans Zhuo et al. 2020
- Leifsonia Evtushenko et al. 2000
- Leucobacter Takeuchi et al. 1996
- "Luethyella" O'Neal et al. 2017
- "Candidatus Lumbricidiphila" corrig. Lund et al. 2018
- Lysinibacter Tuo et al. 2015
- Lysinimonas Jang et al. 2013
- "Marinisubtilis" Qin et al. 2021
- Marisediminicola Li et al. 2010
- Microbacterium Orla-Jensen 1919 (Approved Lists 1980)
- Microcella Tiago et al. 2005
- Microterricola Matsumoto et al. 2008
- Mycetocola Tsukamoto et al. 2001
- Naasia Weon et al. 2013
- Okibacterium Evtushenko et al. 2002
- Parafrigoribacterium Kong et al. 2016
- Planctomonas Liu et al. 2019
- "Candidatus Planktoluna" Hahn 2009
- Plantibacter Behrendt et al. 2002
- Pontimonas Jang et al. 2013
- Protaetiibacter Heo et al. 2019
- Pseudoclavibacter Manaia et al. 2004
- Pseudolysinimonas Heo et al. 2019
- Puzihella Sheu et al. 2017
- Rathayibacter Zgurskaya et al. 1993
- Rhodoglobus Sheridan et al. 2003
- Rhodoluna Hahn et al. 2014
- Rudaibacter Kim et al. 2013
- Salinibacterium Han et al. 2003
- Schumannella An et al. 2009
- Subtercola Männistö et al. 2000
- Terrimesophilobacter Hahn et al. 2021

== Phylogeny ==
The currently accepted taxonomy is based on the List of Prokaryotic names with Standing in Nomenclature and the phylogeny is based on whole-genome sequences. (Note: Allohumibacter, Alpinimonas, Amnibacterium, Arenivirga, Canibacter, Chryseoglobus, Compostimonas, Conyzicola, Diaminobutyricibacter, Diaminobutyricimonas, Frigoribacterium, Frondihabitans, Galbitalea, Glaciihabitans, Homoserinibacter, Homoserinimonas, Huakuichenia, Klugiella, Labedella, Lacisediminihabitans, Lysinibacter, Lysinimonas, Marisediminicola, Microcella, Naasia, Parafrigoribacterium, Planctomonas, Pontimonas, Protaetiibacter, Pseudolysinimonas, Puzihella, Rhodoglobus, Rudaibacter, Schumannella, and Subtercola are not included in this phylogenetic tree.)

- - Microbacteriaceae
    - Pseudoclavibacter
    - - - Gulosibacter
        - Leucobacter
      - - - Microbacterium
          - Agrococcus
        - - Rhodoluna
          - - Curtobacterium
            - - Salinibacterium
              - - - Clavibacter
                  - - Rathayibacter
                    - - Agreia
                      - - Cnuibacter
                        - Herbiconiux
                - - - Aurantimicrobium
                    - - Mycetocola
                      - - Okibacterium
                        - Plantibacter
                  - - - Leifsonia
                      - - Gryllotalpicola
                        - Humibacter
                    - - - Glaciibacter
                        - Cryobacterium
                      - - Microterricola
                        - Agromyces
  - outgroup
    "Tropherymataceae"
