= Whole sour cabbage =

Fermented vegetable preserve

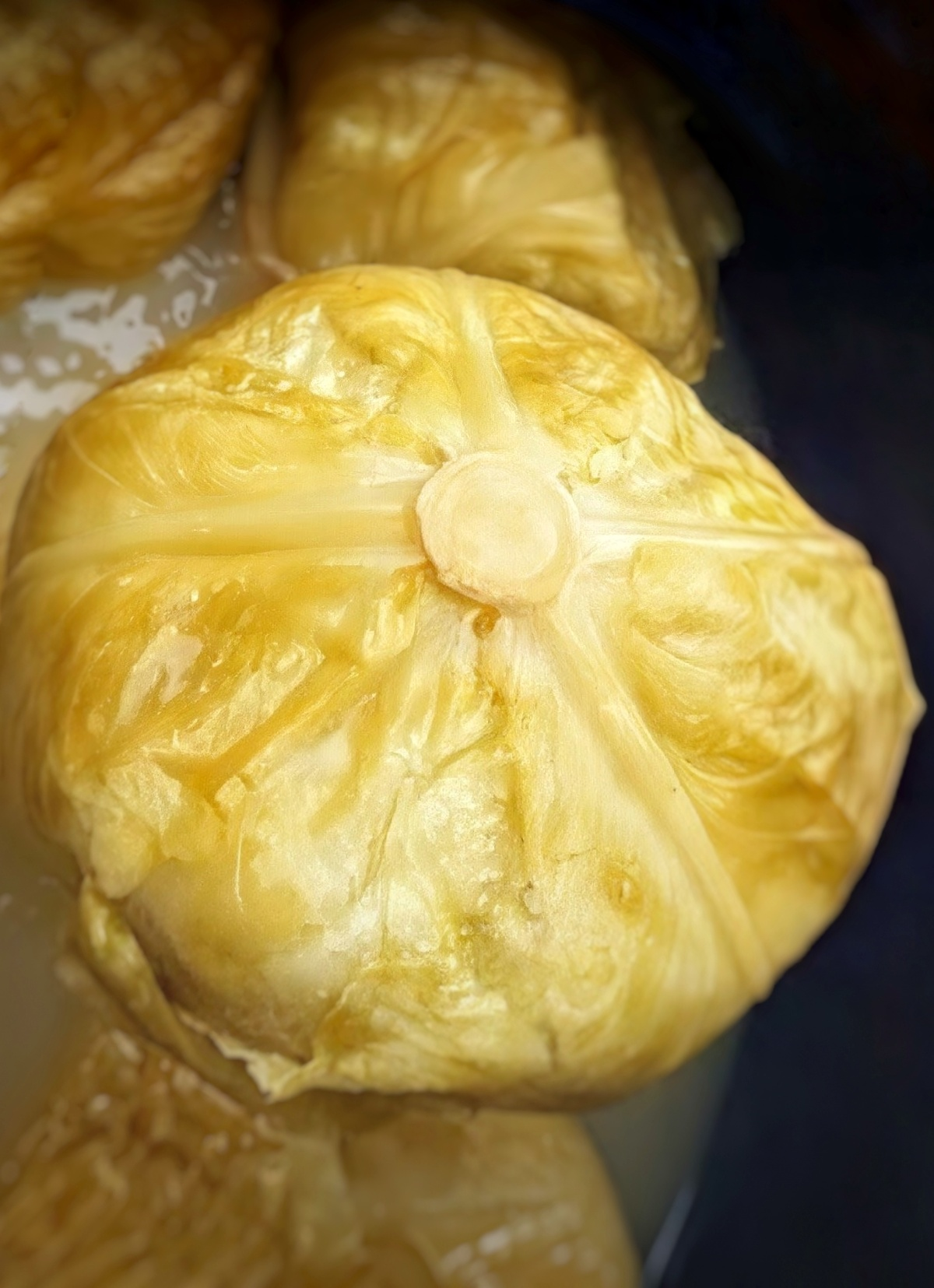
Sour cabbage heads in a barrel with brine

Whole sour cabbage is a fermented vegetable food preserve, popular in Eastern European and Balkan cuisines. It is similar to sauerkraut, with the difference that it is prepared through the lacto-fermentation for several weeks of whole heads of cabbage, not separate leaves or grated mass. No vinegar or boiling is required. It is a homemade food preserve, commonly prepared in large barrels filled with whole cabbage heads and water salted with sea salt.

== Name ==
In Croatian, it is called Kiseli kupus u glavicama or Kiselo zelje u glavicama, with a few other varieties. In Serbian, it is called Kiseli kupus u glavicama. In both languages the meaning is literally "sour cabbage in heads".

== Preparation ==
After the external leaves and core have been removed, the cabbage heads are salted, packed into a barrel as densely as possible and covered with salted water. A heavy load (a rock, for example) is placed above, to keep them under the water, in anaerobic conditions. From time to time the brine has to be reversed (flushed from the bottom of the barrel and then again sluiced onto the top), and topped up if necessary. A higher salinity makes the fermentation slower, while an insufficient salinity makes it unsafe. Higher temperatures require a higher salinity. The fermentation should be done at 16-22 °C. The best temperature is 18-20 °C. A cabbage fermented at a lower temperature has a better fragrance. The best known microorganisms involved in the process include Leuconostoc mesenteroides, Lactobacillus brevis, Enterococcus faecalis, Pediococcus acidilactici and Lactobacillus plantarum.

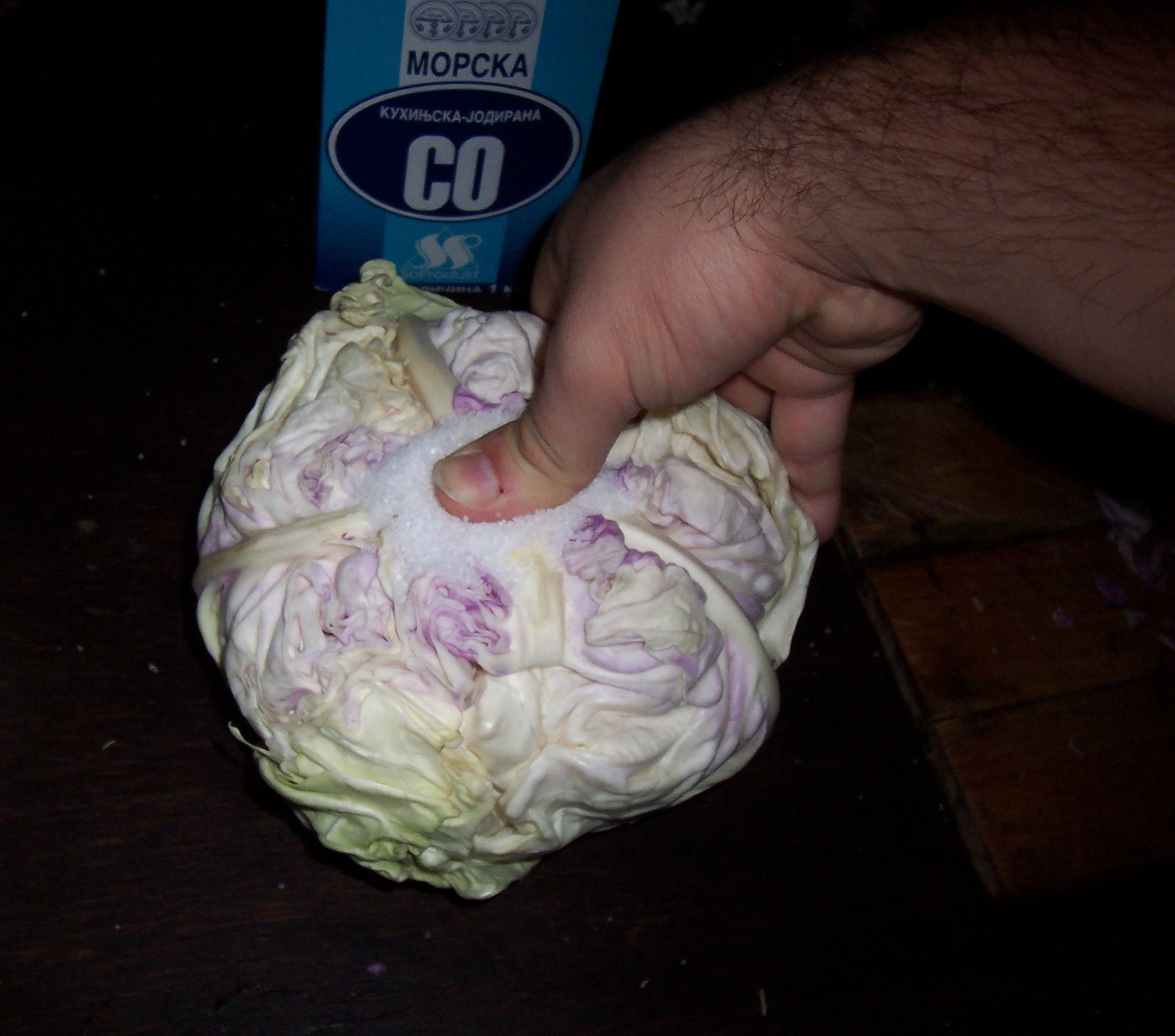
Pressing salt into cabbage

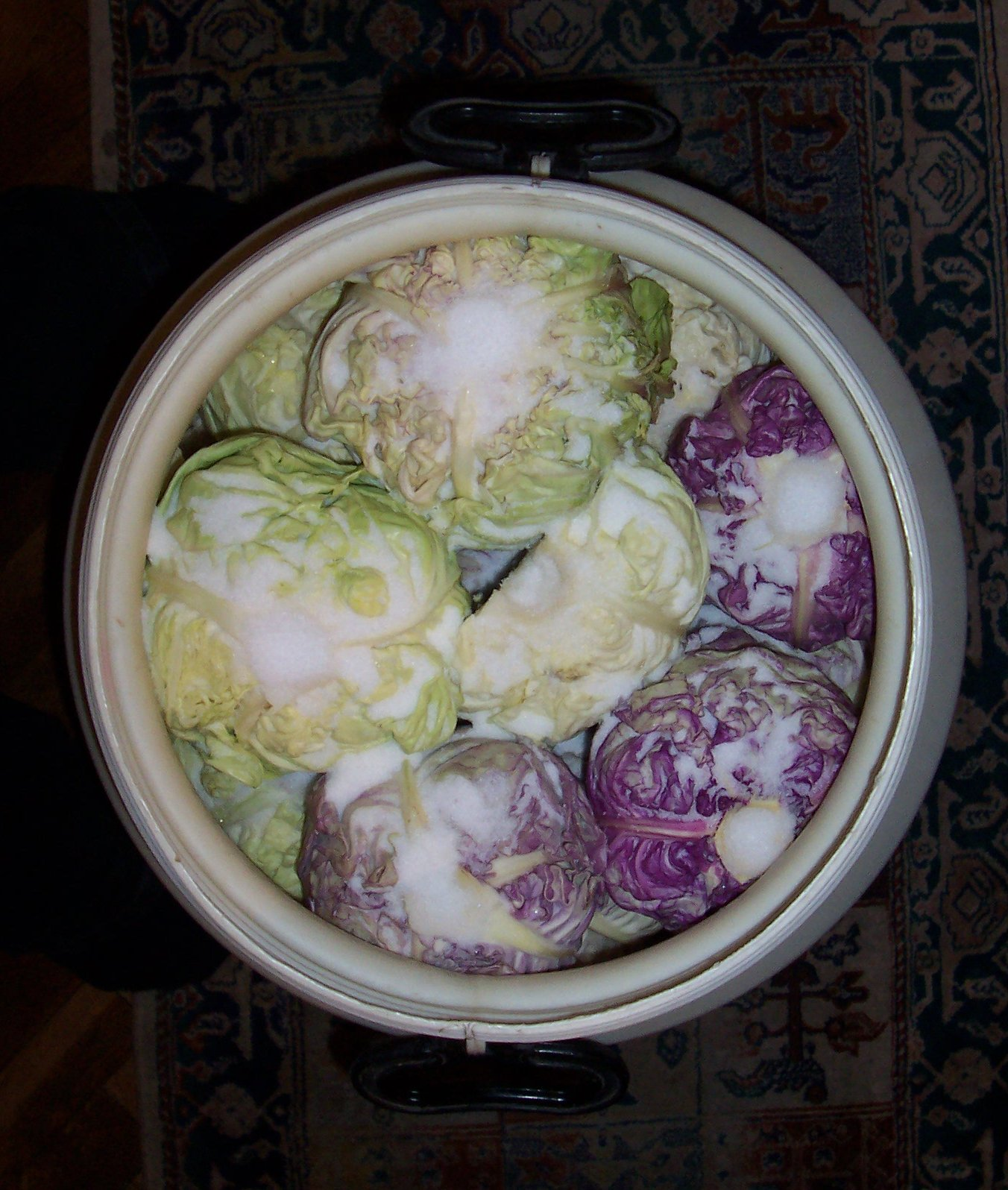
A barrel filled with cabbage heads

== Use ==
Sour cabbage is a popular Bosnian, Bulgarian, Croatian, Macedonian, Romanian, and Serbian food, consumed mainly during the winter half of the year, both raw or cooked. Raw, it is a very popular winter salad, usually served dusted with pepper powder (aleva paprika) and/or black pepper, but also as-is. In cooking, it is used for sarma, and in other dishes, such as podvarak.

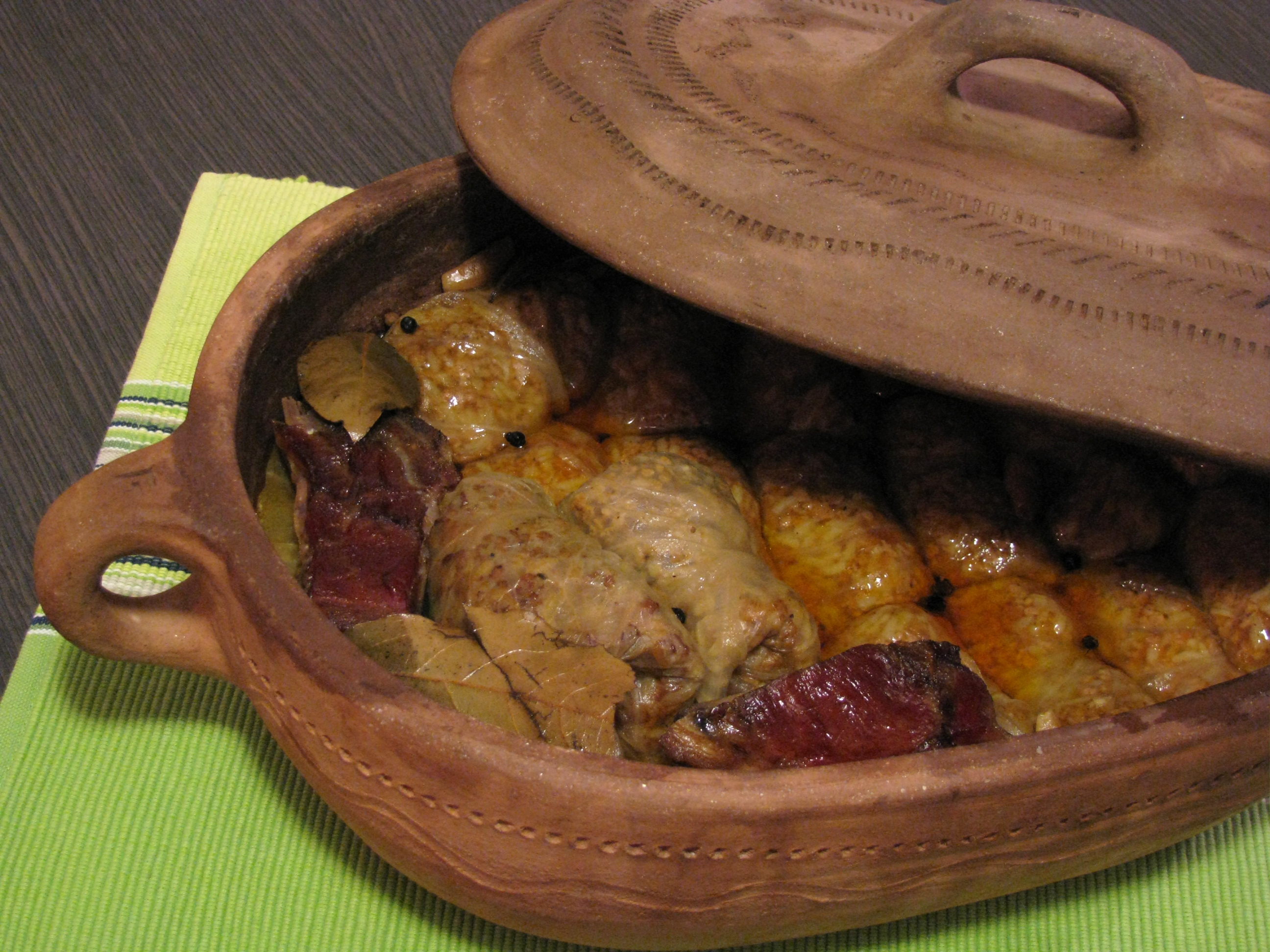
Sarma

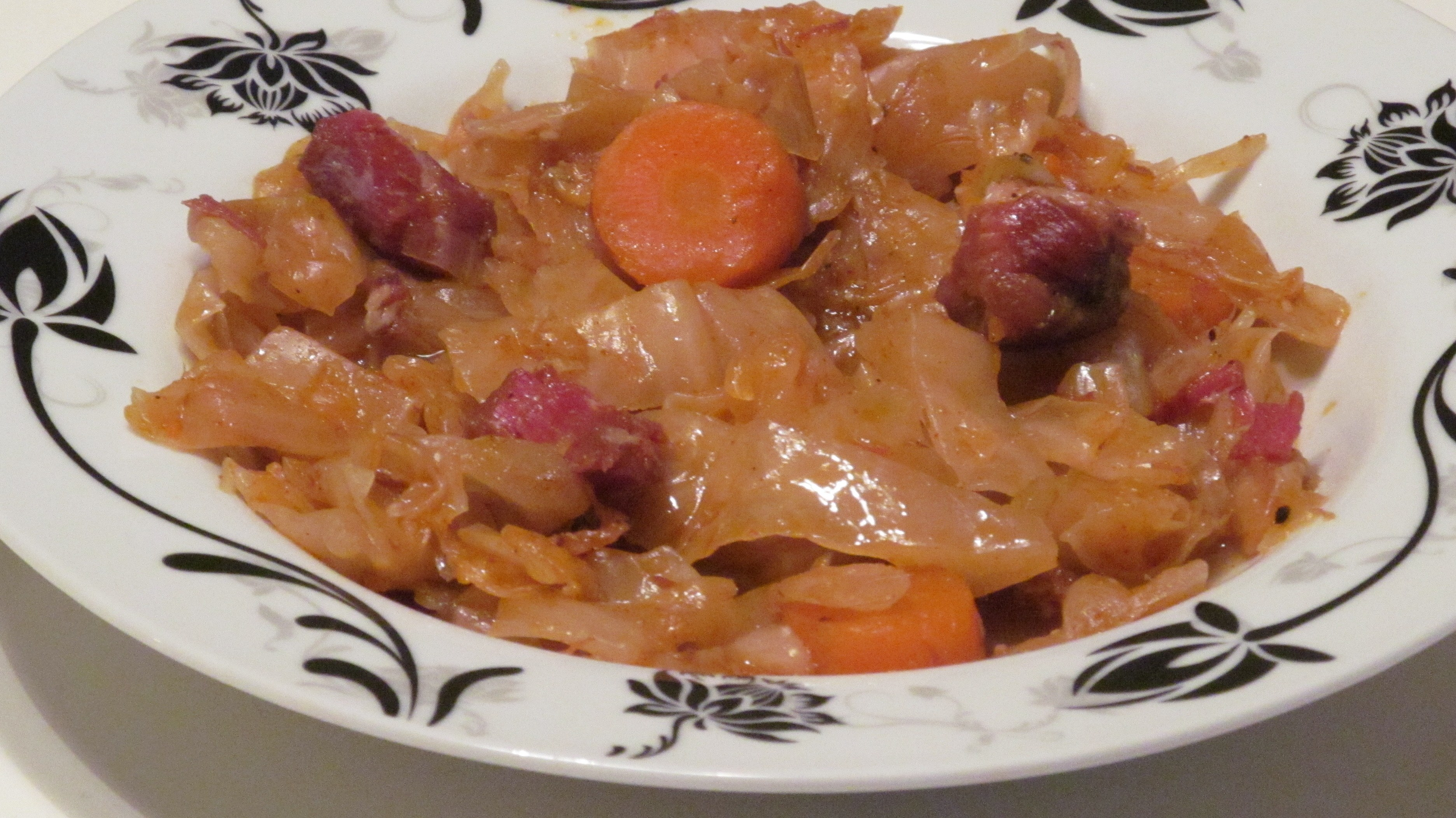
Podvarak

== Protections ==
The Croatian Ogulin sauerkraut (Ogulinski kiseli kupus/Ogulinsko kiselo zelje) has been registered in the European Union's protected designation of origin register since 2015.

== See also ==
- Kraut juice – German drink
- List of cabbage dishes
