= Podvarak =

Serbian dish

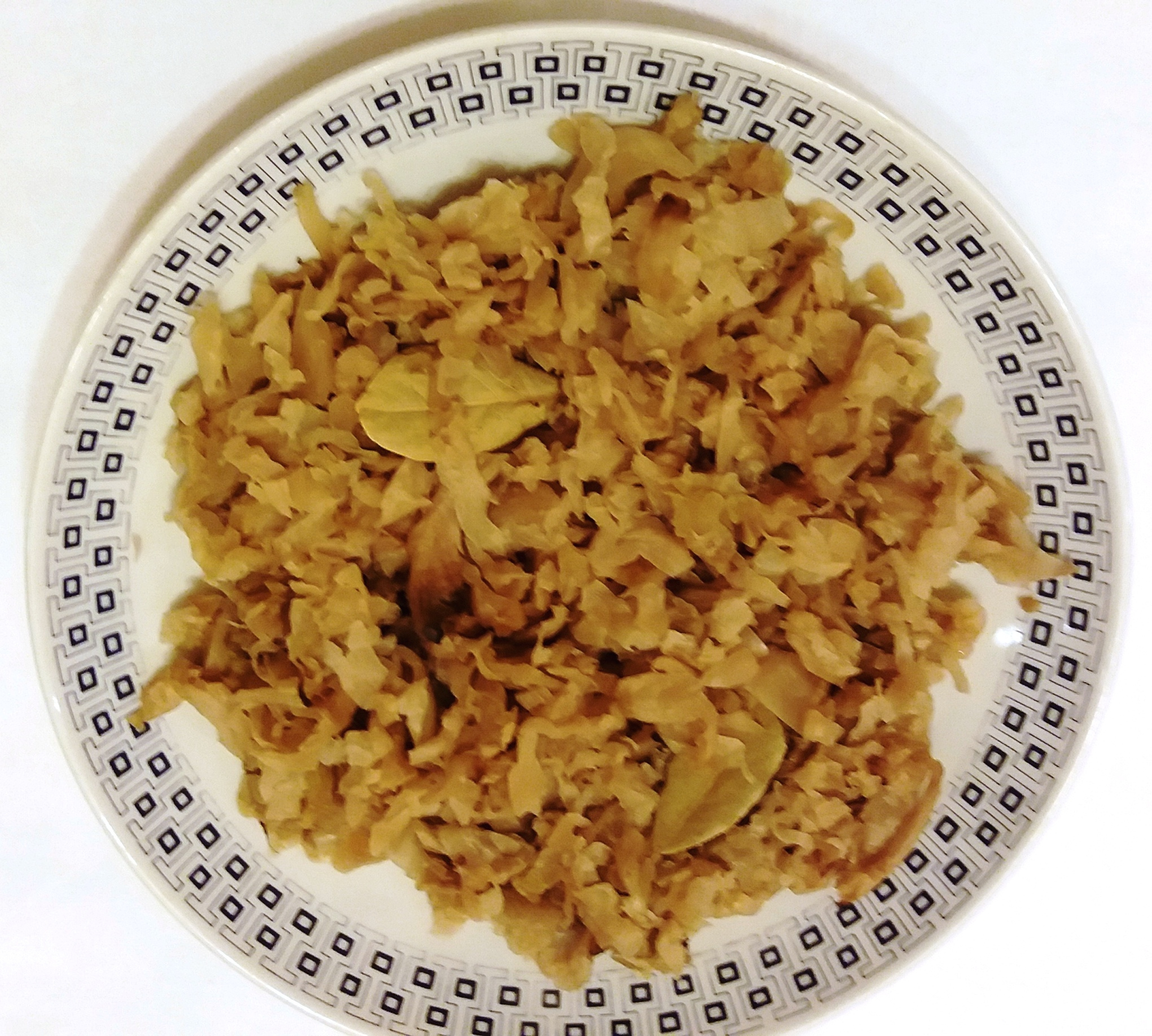
- Typical serving of podvarak
- Course: Main, side dish
- Place of origin: Serbia
- Region or state: Balkans
- Serving temperature: Hot
- Main ingredients: fresh cabbage or sauerkraut and meat
- Variations: Multiple

Podvarak (Serbian Cyrillic: подварак) is a dish popular across the countries of the former Yugoslavia. The primary ingredients are sour cabbage or sauerkraut (подварак од киселог купуса) or fresh cabbage (подварак од слатког купуса), finely chopped onions and meat, usually pork roast or lightly cooked chicken, which are then combined and baked in an oven for all flavors to combine. The dish is commonly seasoned with very finely chopped bacon (typically fried together with chopped onions), garlic, ground paprika and sometimes tomato sauce or chopped sausage. Bacon is often used as flavoring even when the meat ingredient is chicken or turkey meat.

The meal is often made in larger quantities for family gatherings in the winter time (it is a common addition to the table at Christmas or family gatherings in the days after Christmas in both Serb and Croat communities in the area), and is used as both the main dish or as a meatless (made with onions and vegetables only) side dish.

In Bosniak Muslim communities in the Balkans, the dish is made without bacon or pork, with poultry, beef, or lamb; sometimes lamb pastrami or beef sujuk are used as cured, smoked flavoring for the dish.

== Similar dishes ==
- Polish bigos is a similar dish, the main difference being that podvarak is always baked in the oven to caramelize meat and cabbage for deeper flavor, and sometimes baked in a sač, outdoors, for additional smokiness.
- Wedding cabbage is a traditional Serbian dish. The main ingredients are cabbage and meat, which could be pork, bacon, lamb or mutton.
