= Tabhane =

Cultural heritage monument of Kosovo

Coordinates: 42°22′39″N 20°25′46″E

- Tabhane (Albanian)
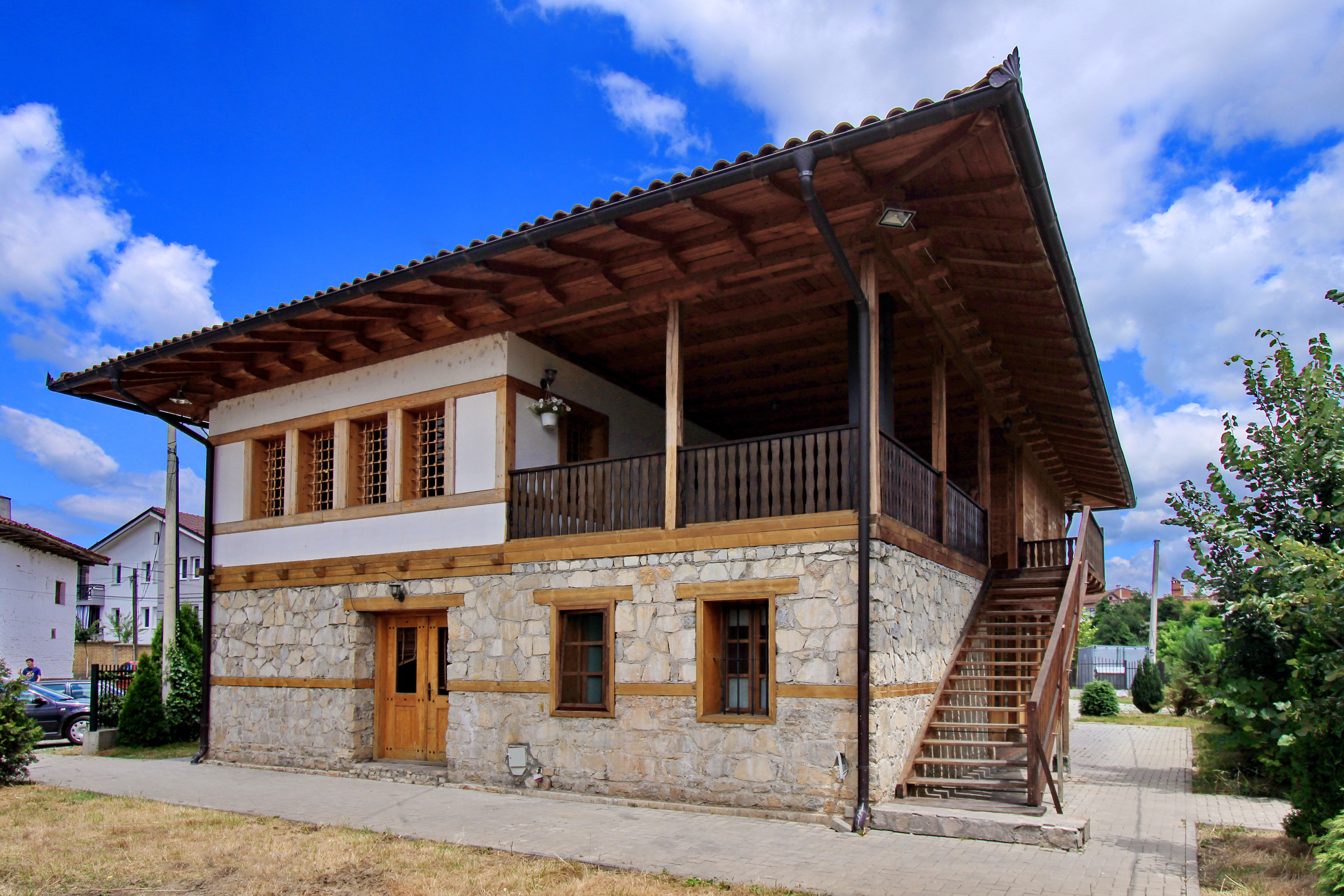
- Interactive map of Tabhane
- Location: Gjakova, Kosovo

History
- Built: 17th century

The Tabhane is a cultural heritage monument in Gjakova, Kosovo.

Tabhane is located at a place known locally as Livadhi i Tabhaneve along the Krena River. It was originally built in 1650 as the headquarters for the guild of Turkish tobacco merchants (Albanian: tabakëve), a powerful institution that also built the city's Tabak and Taliq Bridges, vital arteries connecting the city with Shkodër and other parts of the Ottoman Empire. In 1663 and 1838 respectively, travelers Evliya Çelebi and Joseph Müller both reported the tabakhane dabbling in the production of both white and black leather. The ample local water supply was key to both trades. In 1850, 60 tabakhane worked in tanning.

Tanners used both the raw skin storage shed still standing and a skin drying hut no longer up. The hides from the former were washed in a wooden river sluice before being sent to the two-story square drying hut, including a stone first and wooden second floor and glass-free windows to let in the wind. The remaining storage shed is two-story and follows the same pattern with semi-carved stones on the first floor and wood on the second, linked by a wooden exterior staircase on the eastern side. Topping the open-plan building is a two-layer Mediterranean tile roof dovetailing with the wooden window railings. White floors and brown foundation stones pleasantly contrast with the wood colors. Renovated by the Kosovo Ministry of Culture, Youth, and Sport and its affiliated Gjakova Regional Cultural Heritage Center, the Tabhane now houses a restaurant for local cuisine.
