= Leuconostoc =

Scientific classification
- Domain: Bacteria
- Kingdom: Bacillati
- Phylum: Bacillota
- Class: Bacilli
- Order: Lactobacillales
- Family: Lactobacillaceae
- Genus: Leuconostoc van Tieghem 1878 (Approved Lists 1980)

Type species
- Leuconostoc mesenteroides (Tsenkovskii 1878) van Tieghem 1878 (Approved Lists 1980)

Species
- See text.

Synonyms
- "Ascococcus" Tsenkovskii 1878

Genus of bacteria

Leuconostoc is a genus of gram-positive bacteria, placed within the family of Leuconostocaceae, order Lactobacillales. They are generally ovoid cocci often forming chains. Leuconostoc spp. are intrinsically resistant to vancomycin and are catalase-negative (which distinguishes them from staphylococci). All species within this genus are heterofermentative and are able to produce dextran from sucrose. They are generally slime-forming. The name Leuconostoc comes from Greek adjective leukos, meaning "clear"; and the word nostoc, itself derived from Germanic roots for "nostril" and "gelatin"; creating Leuconostoc - colorless nostoc.

Blamed for causing the 'stink' when creating a sourdough starter, some species are also capable of causing human infection. Because they are an uncommon cause of disease in humans, standard commercial identification kits are often unable to identify the organism.

Leuconostoc spp., along with other lactic acid bacteria such as Pediococcus and Lactobacillus, are responsible for the fermentation of cabbage, making it sauerkraut. In this process, fresh cabbage is fermented in a light brine, where the sugars in the cabbage are transformed by lactofermentation to lactic acid which gives the cabbage a sour flavour and good keeping qualities. Leuconostoc spp. are similarly part of the symbiotic colonies of bacteria and yeast (SCOBY) involved in the fermentation of kefir, a fermented milk beverage and kombucha, a fermented tea.

== Species ==
The genus Leuconostoc comprises the following species:

- Leuconostoc carnosum Shaw and Harding 1989
- Leuconostoc citreum Farrow et al. 1989
- Leuconostoc falkenbergense Wu and Gu 2021
- Leuconostoc fallax Martinez-Murcia and Collins 1992
- "Leuconostoc garlicum" Kim et al. 2002
- Leuconostoc gasicomitatum Björkroth et al. 2001
- Leuconostoc gelidum Shaw and Harding 1989
- Leuconostoc holzapfelii De Bruyne et al. 2007
- Leuconostoc inhae Kim et al. 2003
- Leuconostoc kimchii Kim et al. 2000
- Leuconostoc lactis Garvie 1960 (Approved Lists 1980)
- Leuconostoc litchii Chen et al. 2020
- Leuconostoc mesenteroides (Tsenkovskii 1878) van Tieghem 1878 (Approved Lists 1980)
- Leuconostoc miyukkimchii Lee et al. 2012
- Leuconostoc palmae Ehrmann et al. 2009
- Leuconostoc pseudomesenteroides Farrow et al. 1989
- Leuconostoc rapi Lyhs et al. 2015
- Leuconostoc suionicum (Gu et al. 2012) Jeon et al. 2017

== Leuconostoc citrovorum ==
The name Leuconostoc citrovorum (Hammer) Hucker and Pederson 1931 was rejected in 1971 as a nomen dubium by the Judicial Commission of International Committee on Systematics of Prokaryotes (in Opinion 45) and is now named Leuconostoc mesenteroides subsp. cremoris.

== Phylogeny ==
The currently accepted taxonomy is based on the List of Prokaryotic names with Standing in Nomenclature and the phylogeny is based on whole-genome sequences.

- - Leuconostoc
    - - - - - Leuconostoc gelidum
            - Leuconostoc kimchii
          - - Leuconostoc lactis
            - Leuconostoc citreum
        - Leuconostoc carnosum
      - - Leuconostoc pseudomesenteroides
        - Leuconostoc mesenteroides
    - Leuconostoc fallax
  - outgroups
    - Fructobacillus
    - Convivina
