= Lactobacillus thermophilus =

Scientific classification
- Domain: Bacteria
- Kingdom: Bacillati
- Phylum: Bacillota
- Class: Bacilli
- Order: Lactobacillales
- Family: Lactobacillaceae
- Genus: Lactobacillus
- Species: L. thermophilus

Binomial name
- Lactobacillus thermophilus Ayers and Johnson 1924

Species of bacterium

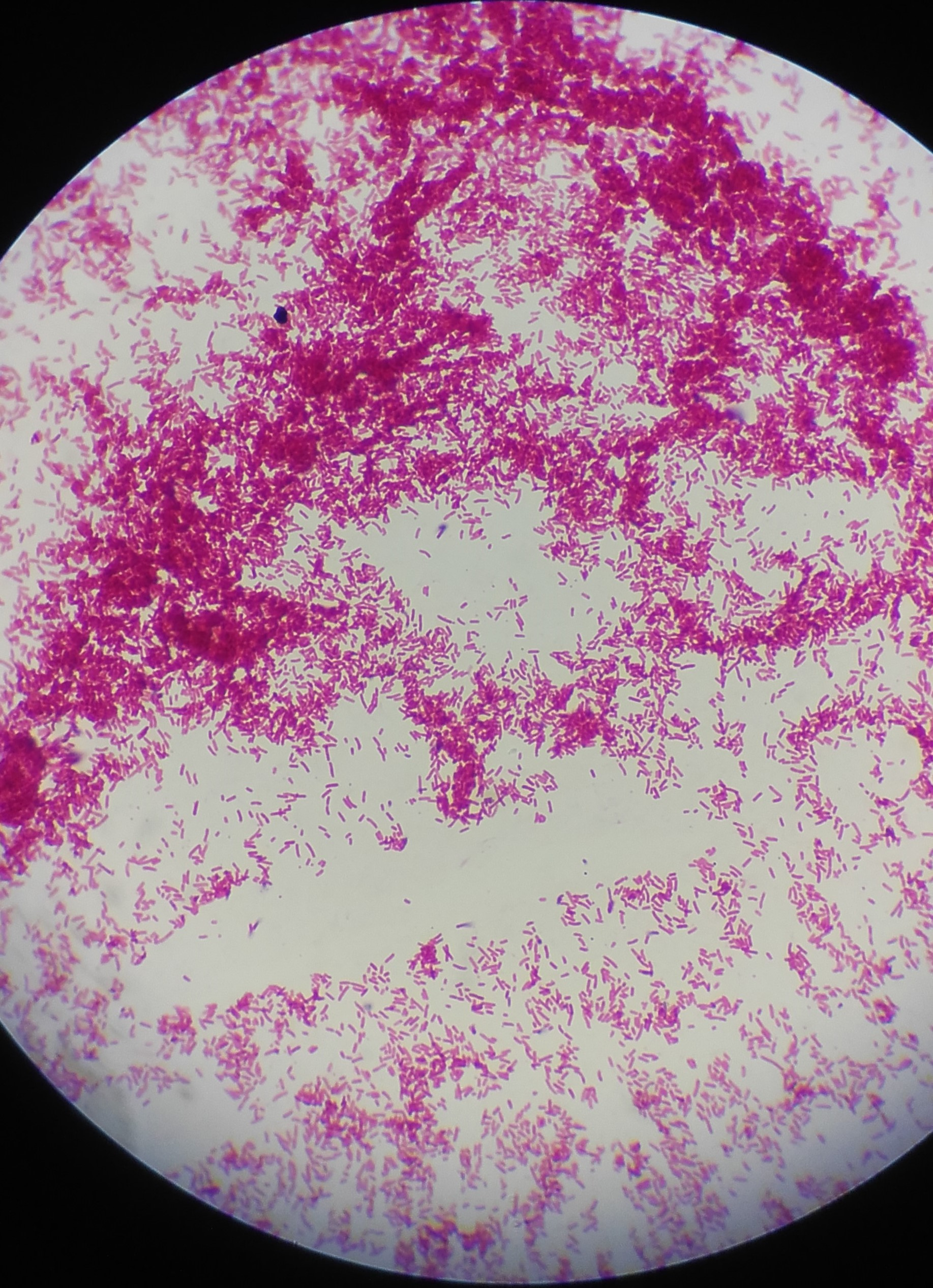
Gram Positive Staining on a bacterium from the order Lactobacillus.

"Lactobacillus thermophilus" is a gram-positive, non-motile, non-sporulating rod-shaped bacterium. It belongs to the genus Bacillus, but has not been formally named or reclassified. Found mostly in pasteurized milk, the bacterium is reported to grow optimally from 50 °C to 60 °C. The bacterium is a facultative anaerobe and has shown the ability to create acid using numerous sugars and alcohols. Most of the lactic acid produced by the organism is D-lactic acid, however studies have shown the production of some L-lactic acid.
