= Kosovan cuisine =

Culinary traditions of Kosovo

The cuisine of Kosovo is a representative of the cuisine of the Balkans and consists of traditional dishes by ethnic groups native to Kosovo. Due to Albanians being the main ethnic group in Kosovo, it is mainly an expression of Albanian cuisine, also adopting some elements of other Balkan countries.

Bread, dairy, meat, fruits and vegetables are important staples in Kosovan cuisine. With diversity of recipes, the Kosovan daily cuisine adjusts well to the country's occasional hot summers and the frequent long winters. As a result of its continental climate, fresh vegetables are consumed in summer while pickles throughout autumn and winter.

Breakfast in Kosovo is usually light, consisting primarily of a croissant with coffee, sandwiches, scrambled eggs, omelettes, petulla or toast with salami, processed cheese, lettuce and tea. Cereals with milk, waffles, pretzels and homemade pancakes with honey or marmalade are also frequently consumed especially by children.

== Dishes ==
Common dishes include pies, flija, stuffed peppers, legumes, sarma, and kebab/qebapa.

The most common dishes in wintertime in Kosovo contain pickled items like sauerkraut, green tomatoes, cucumbers, cauliflower, and condiments such as ajvar (hot or mild red peppers) which is usually seasoned in early autumn. These foods are used in appetizers throughout the year.

== Bread ==
Varieties of bread are available throughout the country. Notably: pitalka, pita, cornbread (also known as "Leqenik"), nore (also known as pogaçe), kifli and whole wheat bread among others.

== Pies ==
Pies in Kosovo are known as "trejte", or "pite". A variety of pies are common:

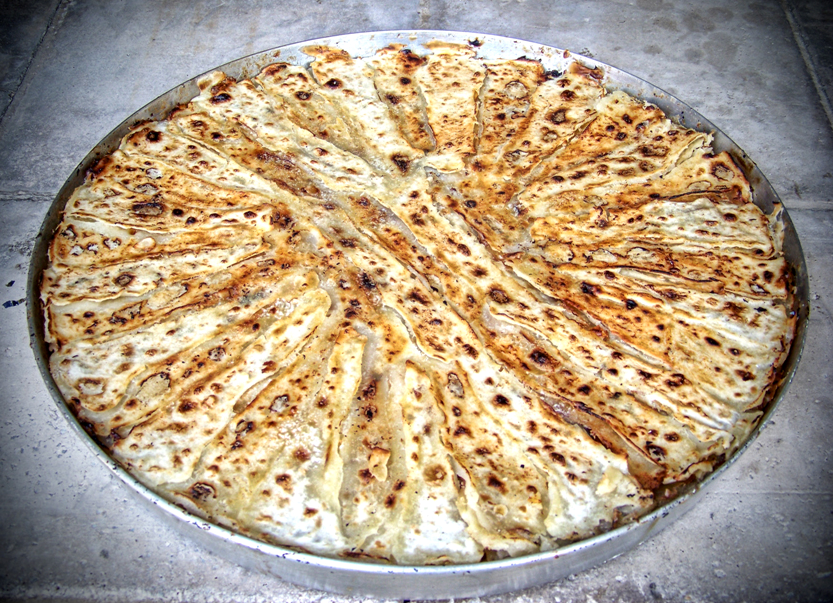
Flija

- Kollpite- a baked crust with nothing inside and covered with yogurt
- Burek- also known as pie in Albania. Byrek is made of pastry layers filled with minced meat, white cheese or spinach.
- Bakllasarm - a salty pie with yoghurt and garlic covering
- Kungullore- savory pastry with pumpkin filling
- Pite me Spanaq- savory pastry with spinach filling, also known as Spanakopita
- Leqenik, known also as Kryelanë (Krelanë)
- Resenik - cabbage pie
- Purrenik - leek pie
- Hithenik - nettle pie

== Salads and appetizers ==
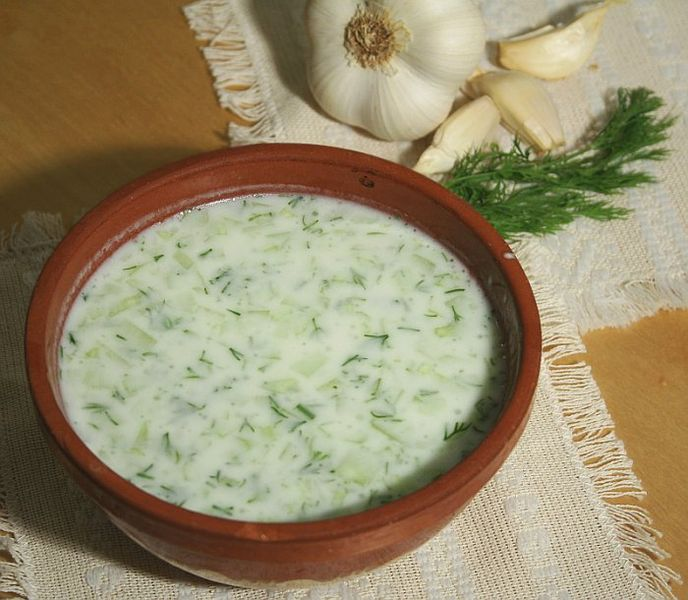
Tarator

Typical salad ingredients include tomatoes, onion, garlic, pepper, cucumber, potato, cabbage, lettuce, carrots, and beans.

- Potato salad
- Tarator - a traditional salad made with cucumbers, garlic and yogurt; commonly served in summer.
- Shope salad - a simple salad made of tomato, cucumber, onions and white cheese.
- Tomato salad - a salad made of tomato, onions and optionally chili peppers.
- Sallatë të zime - a cooked salad made of tomato, onions, peppers, garlic and cream, similar to the albanian fërgesë.

In Kosovar cuisine, a traditional dairy-based food commonly known by regional names such as "long"/"lang" or "t’ngjym" is consumed with bread and constitutes a characteristic element of rural and domestic food culture. It is prepared primarily from milk fat (cream), often combined with small amounts of curd or cottage cheese (gjizë).

The food is traditionally eaten with bread, either as a spread or by dipping. It may be served either cold, often accompanied by raw garlic or warm (I vlum), commonly combined with roasted peppers.

== Main dishes ==
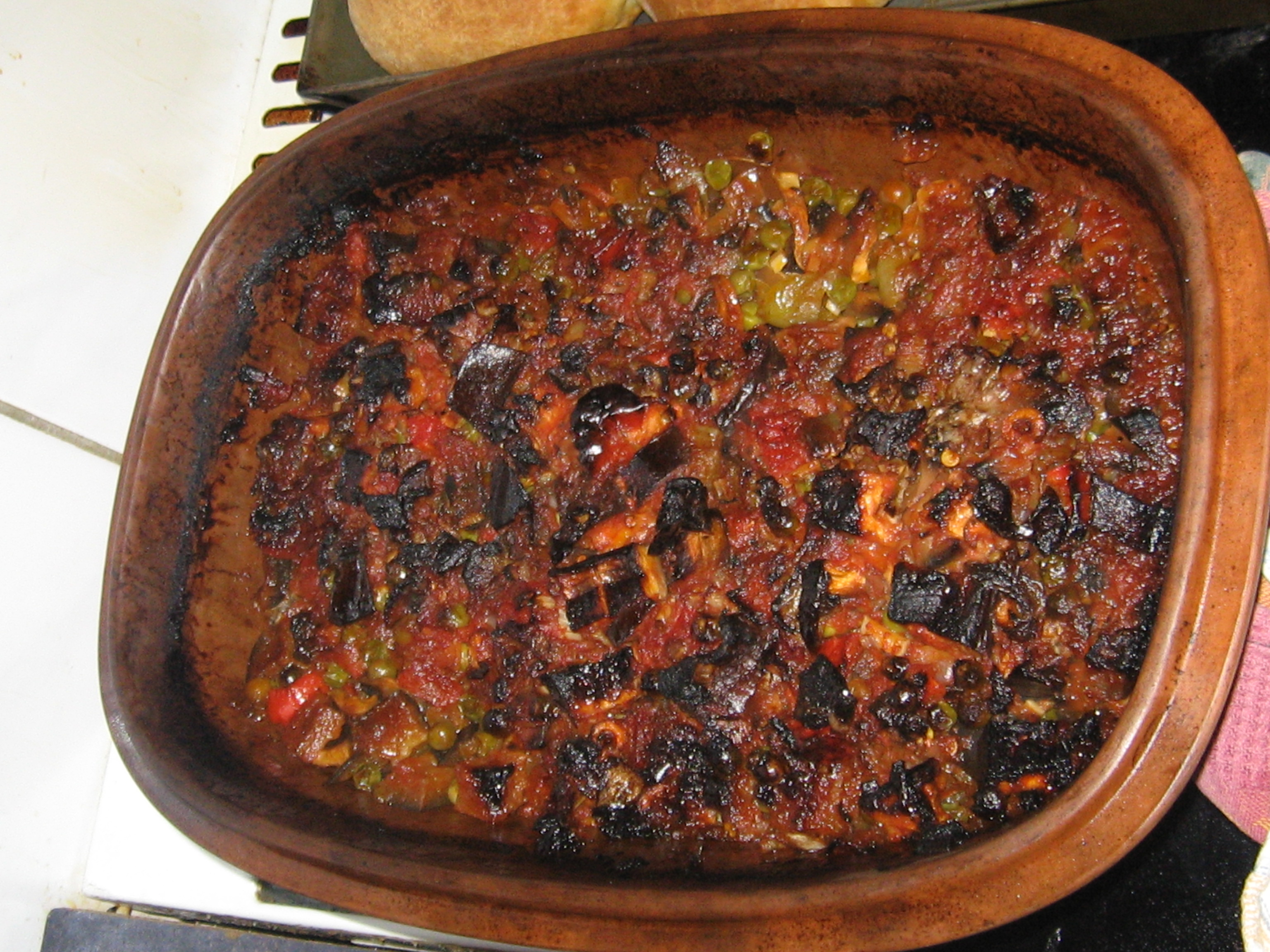
Tava e Prizrenit

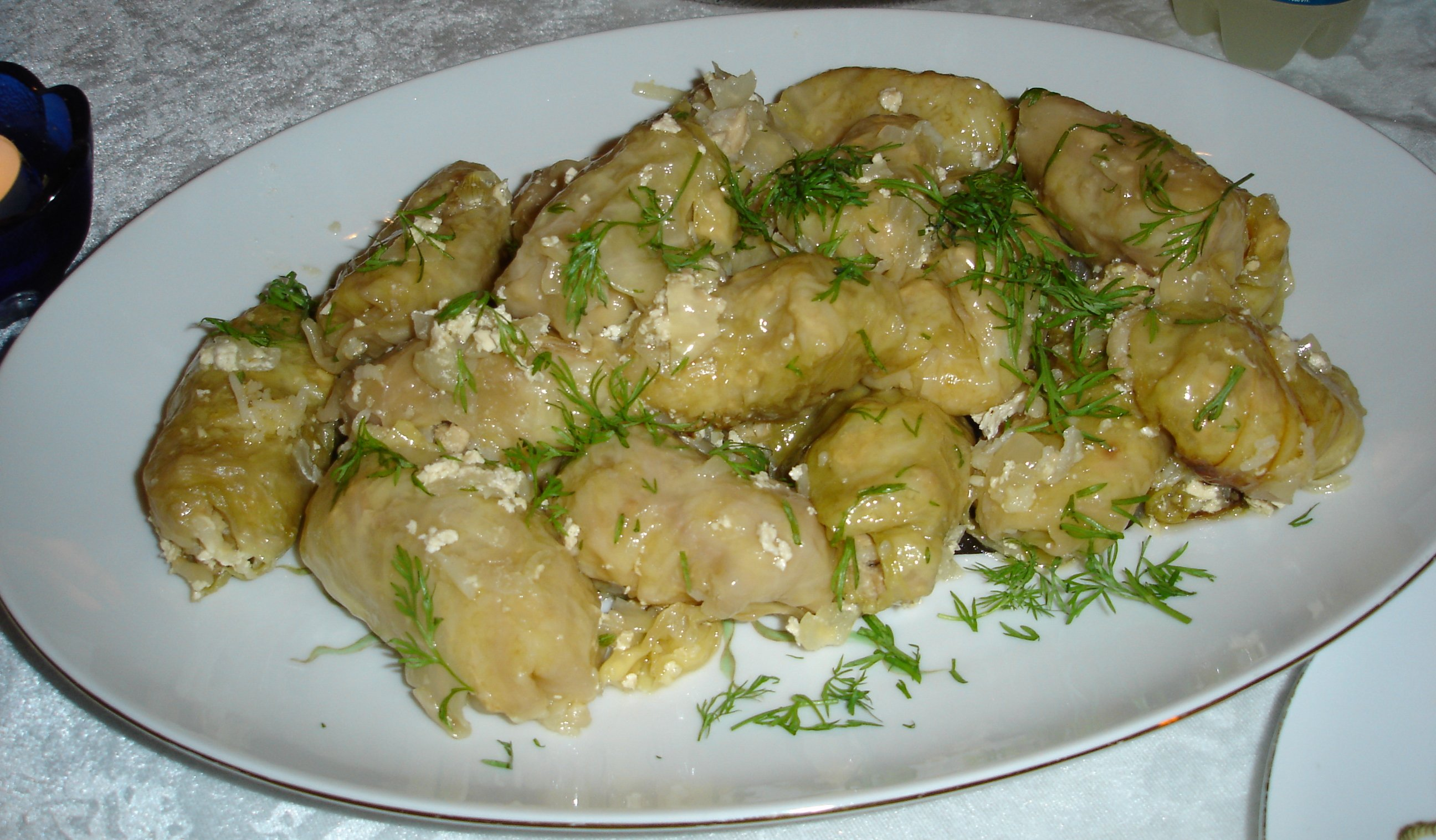
Sarma in cabbage leaves

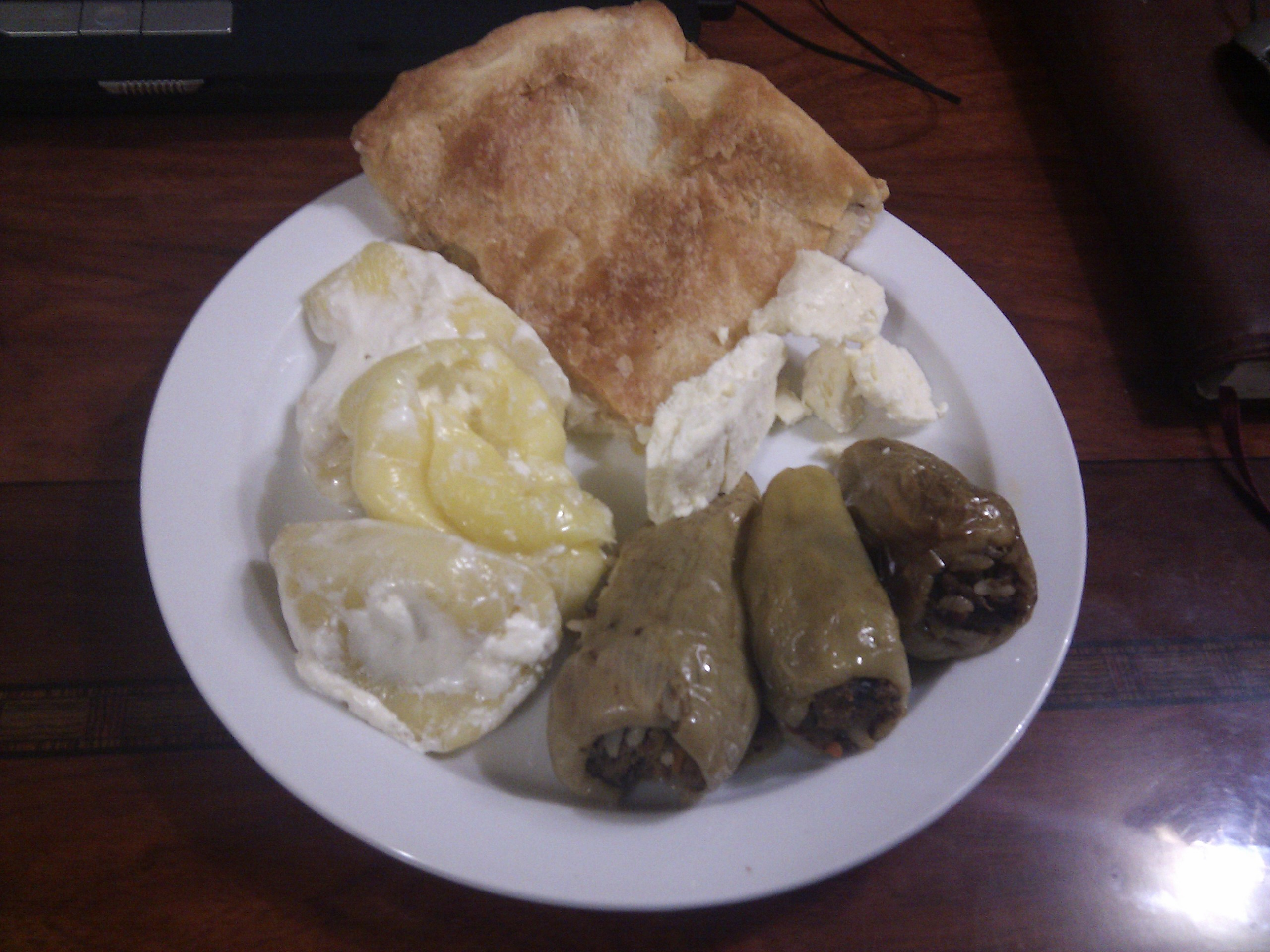
Sarma, peppers filled with kefir and cottage cheese, and pite

Tavë Prizreni is a traditional regional casserole from the southern city of Prizren. It is made with lamb, eggplants, okra, green peppers, onions, tomatoes and is served hot. Sarma is also another common lunch dish which consists of (but is not limited to) minced meat wrapped with cabbage or vine leaves.

- Stuffed peppers - with meat, rice and vegetables
- Lasagne - alternated with sauces and various other ingredients
- Qebapa - small grilled meat skinless sausages made of lamb and beef mix; served with onions, sour cream, ajvar and pitalka bread
- Pilaf- rice dish similar to risotto
- Pasulj - soup usually made of white beans, prepared with beef and paprika
- Suxhuk - a dry, spicy and fermented sausage
- Tavë - a traditional dish with lamb chops
- Tavë kosi - baked lamb with yogurt

== Fish ==
The most popular fish dishes constitute of fried freshwater fish like zander and carp. A speciality is considered the tavë krapi, carp cooked in a pot, more widely used in cities around the Dukagjini valley, notably Gjakova because of its relation with Shkodër. The garnish is composed of garlic, bay leaf, tomato, parsley.

== Desserts ==
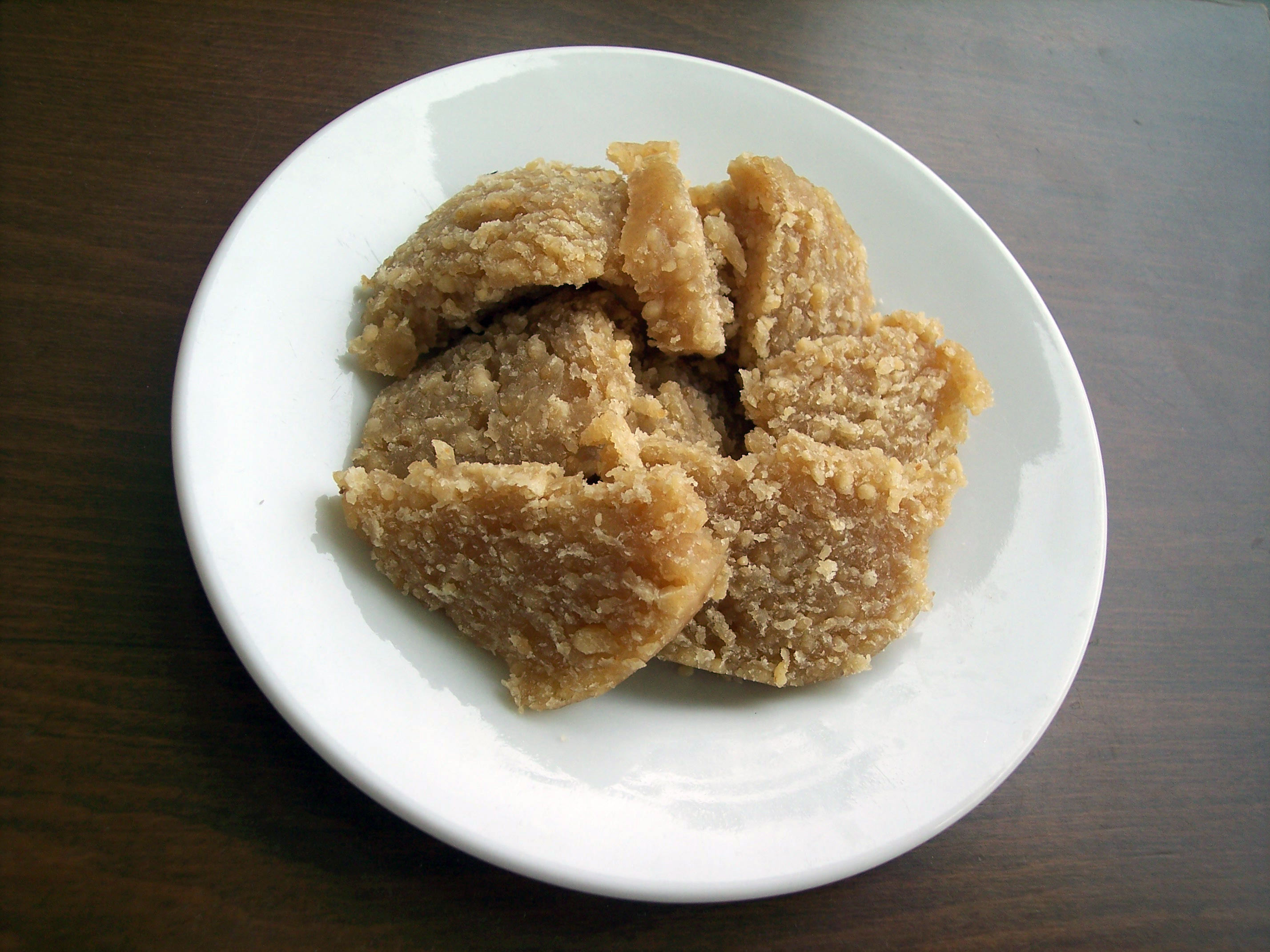
Havell

Traditional Kosovan desserts are often made with sorbet which is enhanced with lemon or vanilla flavour. The mainstream pastries include Baklava (regional), Cremeschnitte, Pudding, Crêpe, Tulluma, Tespishte, Rovani, etc.

- Baklava is a rich, sweet pastry made of layers of filo pastry filled with chopped nuts and sweetened with syrup or honey.
- Rice pudding is a dish made from rice mixed with water or milk and sometimes other ingredients such as cinnamon and raisins. Different variants are used for either desserts or dinners. When used as a dessert, it is commonly combined with a sweetener such as sugar.
- Cremeschnitte is a chantilly and custard cream cake.
- Kek a similar form of sweet dessert to cake.
- Havell is a flour-based sweet confection of non Kosovan origin.

== Drinks ==
Drinking coffee is part of a big tradition in Kosovo. It is widely consumed and served everywhere at cafés, bars or restaurants. There are several varieties of coffee popular in Kosovo, which include instant coffee, brewed coffee, Turkish coffee and espresso.

The most popular traditional drink in Kosovo is Rasoj which is made of a fermented red cabbage. Another popular beverages include boza, lemonade, kompot (usually drank during the autumn and made with seasonal fruit such as quince), beer, as well as coffee and teas.

- Rasoj - Probiotic fermented red cabbage juice consumed mostly during the winter
- Rakia - A popular regional fruit brandy alcoholic beverage. In Kosovo it is typically made from grapes, although some variations exist.
- Boza - A soft drink made of maize and wheat flour. Notorious for being a refreshing summer drink.
- Ajron - A mix of yogurt, water and salt.
- Beer - Some of Kosovo's local beers are "Birra Peja", "Birra Ereniku", "Birra Prishtina", etc.
- Compote - A non-alcoholic sweet beverage that may be served hot or cold, depending on tradition and season.
- Coffee - drip brewed coffee, percolated, espresso (such as macchiato and cappuccino), a variety of instant coffee, etc.
- Tea - The most popular teas are mountain tea, rose hip tea, black tea and peppermint tea.

== See also ==
- Balkan cuisine
- Albanian cuisine
- Serbian cuisine
