= Rapi =

Rapi or RAPI may refer to:

- Råpi, a mountain in Sweden
- Rapi Films, an Indonesian film production company

== People ==
- Luigi Rapi (born 1902), Italian automobile designer
- Nina Rapi, Greek-born playwright

== See also ==
- RPi or Raspberry Pi, a series of small single-board computers
- Leuconostoc rapi a bacterium
- Rapi:t, an express train service in Japan
