= Lactic =

Lactic may refer to:

- Lactic acid
  - Lactic acid bacteria
  - Lactic acid fermentation

== See also ==
- Milk
