= Kanjika =

Indian subcontinental dish

Kanjika (Indian functional food, also abbreviated as Kanji), is a dish, originating from the Indian subcontinent, in which lactic fermentation is the terminal step in food processing; it is suitable for vegans as it is prepared from raw material of plant origin and devoid of dairy product. This is a sour liquid produced from acetous fermentation of powdered rice and dried rice flakes (habala pethi).

Kanjika-satwa is a dried kanjika. Kanjika may be prepared using barley or millet in place of rice. Sometimes bamboo leaves are added along with radish in the fermentation mixture. Fried lentil balls (Urid wada) are also combined with Kanjika. This dish is known as Kanjiwada.
