= Leuconostoc carnosum =

Scientific classification
- Domain: Bacteria
- Kingdom: Bacillati
- Phylum: Bacillota
- Class: Bacilli
- Order: Lactobacillales
- Family: Lactobacillaceae
- Genus: Leuconostoc
- Species: L. carnosum

Binomial name
- Leuconostoc carnosum Shaw and Harding 1989

Species of bacterium

Leuconostoc carnosum is a lactic acid bacterium; its type strain is NCFB 2776. Its genome has been sequenced. Its name derives from the fact that it was first isolated from chill-stored meats. Its significance is that it thrives in anaerobic environments with a temperature around 2 °C, thus has been known to spoil vacuum-packed meat, yet it is not pathogenic and certain strains of L. carnosum are known to produce bactericides known to inhibit or kill Listeria monocytogenes.
