= Leuconostoc miyukkimchii =

Scientific classification
- Domain: Bacteria
- Kingdom: Bacillati
- Phylum: Bacillota
- Class: Bacilli
- Order: Lactobacillales
- Family: Lactobacillaceae
- Genus: Leuconostoc
- Species: L. miyukkimchii

Binomial name
- Leuconostoc miyukkimchii Lee et al. 2012

Type strain
- JCM 17445, KACC 15353, M2

Species of bacterium

Leuconostoc miyukkimchii is a Gram-positive, non-spore-forming, facultatively anaerobic and non-motile bacterium from the genus of Leuconostoc which has been isolated from the fermented algae Undaria pinnatifida from Korea.
