= Leuconostoc palmae =

Scientific classification
- Domain: Bacteria
- Kingdom: Bacillati
- Phylum: Bacillota
- Class: Bacilli
- Order: Lactobacillales
- Family: Lactobacillaceae
- Genus: Leuconostoc
- Species: L. palmae

Binomial name
- Leuconostoc palmae Ehrmann et al. 2009

Type strain
- CIP 110077, DSM 21144, JCM 16944, LMG 24510, TMW 2.694

Species of bacterium

Leuconostoc palmae is a Gram-positive, non-spore-forming and facultatively anaerobic bacterium from the genus of Leuconostoc which has been isolated from palm wine from Senegal.
