= Leuconostoc gelidum =

Scientific classification
- Domain: Bacteria
- Kingdom: Bacillati
- Phylum: Bacillota
- Class: Bacilli
- Order: Lactobacillales
- Family: Lactobacillaceae
- Genus: Leuconostoc
- Species: L. gelidum

Binomial name
- Leuconostoc gelidum Shaw and Harding 1989

Synonyms
- Leuconostoc gasicomitatum Björkroth et al. 2001

Species of bacterium

Leuconostoc gelidum is a Gram-positive lactic acid bacterium; its type strain is NCFB 2775. Its genome has been sequenced. Its name derives from the fact that it was first isolated from chill-stored meats.
