= Leuconostoc falkenbergense =

Scientific classification
- Domain: Bacteria
- Kingdom: Bacillati
- Phylum: Bacillota
- Class: Bacilli
- Order: Lactobacillales
- Family: Lactobacillaceae
- Genus: Leuconostoc
- Species: L. falkenbergense

Binomial name
- Leuconostoc falkenbergense Wu and Gu 2020

Species of bacterium

Leuconostoc falkenbergense is a bacterium from the genus of Leuconostoc.
