= Kraut juice =

German drink

Kraut juice (called Sauerkrautsaft in German, Zeamă de varză/Moare in Romanian, rasol, rasoj or rasuluk in the Balkans) is a beverage that consists of the liquid in which sauerkraut is cured. It is the juice of the vegetable itself and the pickling brine.

It is widely available in many central and eastern European countries, such as Germany, and in the parts of the Northeast and Midwest where German immigrants settled, such as central and western Pennsylvania.

It may be taken as a dietary supplement, as it is a source of vitamin C, B vitamins, Vitamin E, Vitamin K, potassium (475 mg), calcium, phosphorus, sulphur, iron, copper, zinc, magnesium and lactic acid.

== Uses ==
Kraut juice may be drunk alone or used as a component in mixed drinks.

It is one of the alternatives used in Romania to give the traditional soups ciorbă its sour taste.

== See also ==
- Clamato
- Rasol
