= Leuconostoc rapi =

Scientific classification
- Domain: Bacteria
- Kingdom: Bacillati
- Phylum: Bacillota
- Class: Bacilli
- Order: Lactobacillales
- Family: Lactobacillaceae
- Genus: Leuconostoc
- Species: L. rapi

Binomial name
- Leuconostoc rapi Lyhs et al. 2015

Type strain
- DSM 27776, LMG 27676, MHB 277, R-50029

Species of bacterium

Leuconostoc rapi is a Gram-positive bacterium from the genus of Leuconostoc which has been isolated from a rutabaga in Finland.
