= Wedding cabbage =

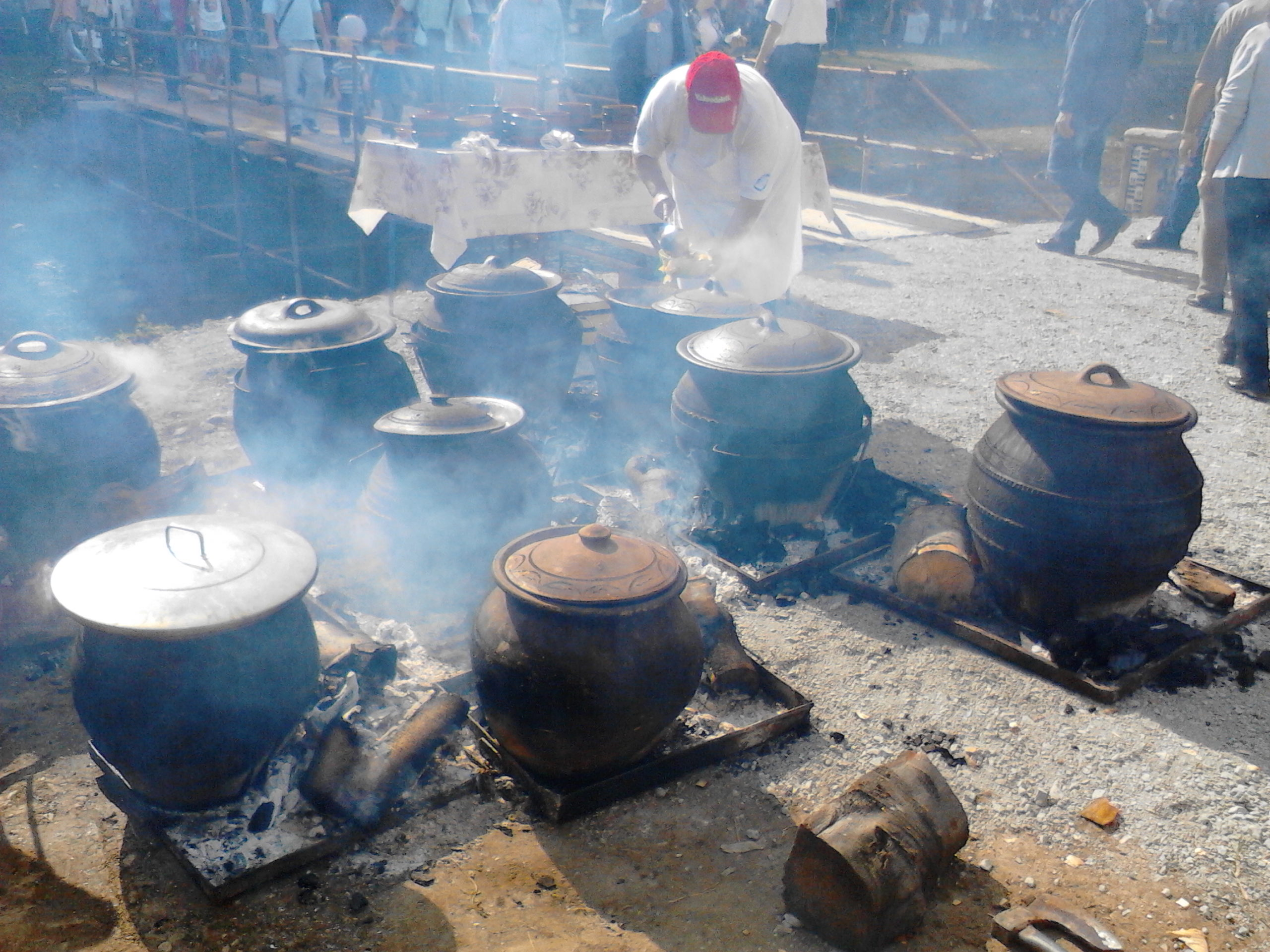
Cooking of wedding cabbage in clay pots, Serbia

Wedding cabbage (Serbian: свадбарски купус / svadbarski kupus) is a traditional Serbian dish. The main ingredients are cabbage and meat, which could be pork or lamb and mutton. It is typically prepared by cooking it slowly for many hours in a large crock. It is traditionally served at weddings and other major events.

== Preparation ==
Layers of diced cabbage and meat are boiled in a crock.

== Cabbage Festival ==
The Cabbage Festival (Kupusijada in Serbian) is held annually in Mrčajevci, where a wedding cabbage competition is held. The winner receives a golden pot, and the runner-up receives a silver pot. In 2012, the festival was attended by more than 100,000 visitors over a three-day period.

== See also ==
- List of cabbage dishes
- Cabbage soup
- Podvarak
