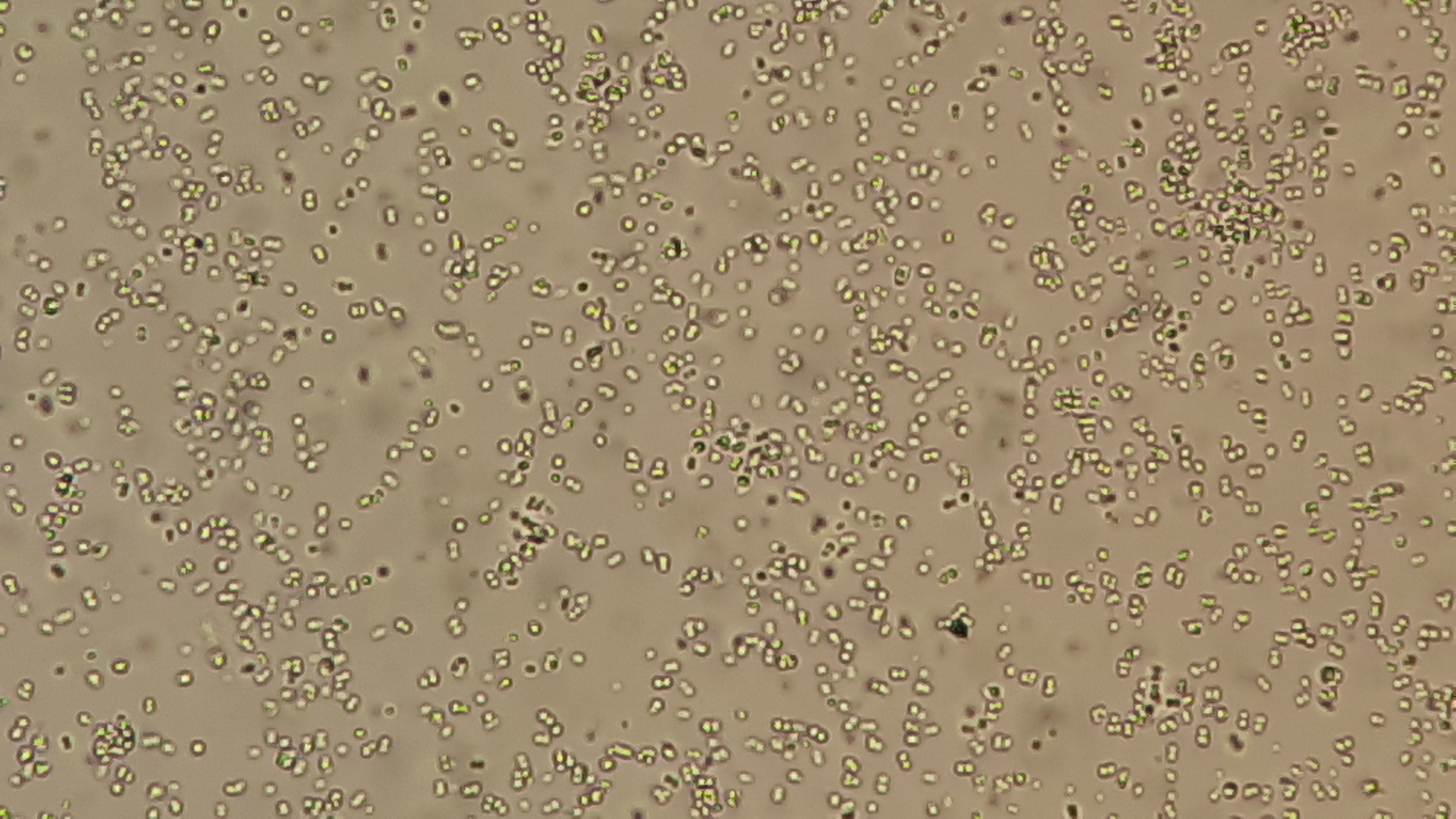

Scientific classification
- Domain: Bacteria
- Kingdom: Bacillati
- Phylum: Bacillota
- Class: Bacilli
- Order: Lactobacillales
- Family: Lactobacillaceae
- Genus: Leuconostoc
- Species: L. mesenteroides

Binomial name
- Leuconostoc mesenteroides (Tsenkovskii 1878) van Tieghem 1878

Synonyms
- Ascococcus mesenteroides Tsenkovskii 1878; Betacoccus arabinosaceus Orla-Jensen 1919

= Leuconostoc mesenteroides =

Species of lactic acid bacteria

Leuconostoc mesenteroides is a species of lactic acid bacteria associated with fermentation, under conditions of salinity and low temperatures (such as lactic acid production in fermented sausages). In some cases of vegetable and food storage, it was associated with pathogenicity (soft rot, slime and unpleasant odor). L. mesenteroides is approximately 0.5–0.7 μm in diameter and has a length of 0.7-1.2 μm, producing small grayish colonies that are typically less than 1.0 mm in diameter. It is facultatively anaerobic, Gram-positive, non-motile, non-sporogenous, and spherical. It often forms lenticular coccoid cells in pairs and chains, however, it can occasionally form short rods with rounded ends in long chains, as its shape can differ depending on what media the species is grown on. L. mesenteroides grows best at 30 °C, but can survive in temperatures ranging from 10 °C to 30 °C. Its optimum pH is 5.5, but can still show growth in pH of 4.5-7.0.

== Microbiological characteristics ==
L. mesenteroides is an obligate heterolactic fermentative lactic acid bacterium (LAB) that is mostly used in industrial dairy fermentation, playing various roles, such as production of dextran, gas, and flavor compounds. It is approximately 0.5–0.7 μm by 0.7–1.2 μm, and produces small grayish colonies that are usually less than 1.0 mm in diameter. L. mesenteroides is a facultative anaerobe and will undergo heterolactic fermentation under microaerophilic conditions. Taking this into consideration, L. mesenteroides utilizes the sugar glucose as its primary source of metabolism, as well as other sugars such as sucrose and fructose. Then, it creates ethanol, lactate, and CO_{2} as products of fermentation. When grown in sucrose solution, it converts the sugar to dextrans having mostly alpha 1,6 linkages, but 1,2, 1,3, and 1,4 linkages are also present.

== Environment ==
L. mesenteroides is typically found on the skin of a large variety of fleshy fruits and vegetables, and can be cultured using MRS agar, tomato juice agar, MRS broth, and skim milk. These common media are not ideal for growth and specialized media are needed to grow to a high cell density. This microbe is commonly used for souring vegetables like cucumbers and cabbage, producing fermented foods such as kimchi, sauerkraut, and pickles. The bacteria is included in dairy starter cultures since they are able to produce metabolites needed for dairy production. These metabolites include diacetyl and CO_{2} from citric acid. Diacetyl is important for dairy because it is the main source of aroma and flavor in many different dairy products, like buttermilk, butter, and different cheeses. The production of CO_{2} is important for the eye formation in many cheeses such as Havarti. Specialized media are commonly used for industrial growth because components in standard media like MRS contain meat extract and peptone that is not Kosher or halal which is needed for many dairy and vegetable products. L. mesenteroides does best in temperatures ranging between 10 °C to 30 °C, but has an optimum temperature of 30 °C. Additionally, it can survive in a pH range of 4.5–7.0, with an optimum of 5.5-6.5. L. mesenteroides also has a doubling time of 0.6 h^{−1} under aerobic conditions.

== Genetics ==
The genome of L. mesenteroides has been successfully mapped, having an average genome size of 1.90138 Mbp and 1762 protein genes, with a G+C content of 37.8%. L. mesenteroides is from the phylum Bacillota, and is a member of the lactic bacteria family. This is important as it has the ability to produce lactic acid which lowers the pH of the surrounding environment and, in turn, inhibits other competing food spoilage organism's growth as they cannot tolerate the acidic environment.

== Health risks ==
Leuconostoc mesenteroides subsp. mesenteroides has been found to show pathogenic characteristics in rare cases. The first case of this infecting a human was in 1985. A more recent outbreak in a hospital in 2004 had 48 cases where it was found that penicillin and gentamicin could be used as antimicrobial treatment. Samples of the bacteria were isolated in both the patient's blood and urine.

== Taxonomy ==
L. mesenteroides is divided into four subspecies.

L. m. subsp. cremoris (Knudsen and Sørensen 1929) Garvie 1983
L. m. subsp. dextranicum (Beijerinck 1912) Garvie 1983
L. m. subsp. jonggajibkimchii Gu et al. 2012
L. m. subsp. mesenteroides (Tsenkovskii 1878) Garvie 1983

Leuconostoc suionicum was considered a subspecies of L. mesenteroides when it was discovered in 2012, however in 2017 it was reclassified as its own species Leuconostoc suionicum

== Subspecies characteristics ==
=== Subsp. Mesenteroides ===
This strain can grow in NaCl up to 3.0% and some strains up to 6.5% and optimum temperature of 20 and 30 °C. It has also been found that when growth occurs in milk with supplemental yeast extract and glucose, enough acid is produced to curdle milk. Some, but not all strains can ferment citrate. Different strains of Subsp. Mesenteroides tested also differ by their need for riboflavin, pyridoxal and folic acid, these need to be tested to determine a starting point for the media. Tween 80, uracil and combinations of uracil, adenine, and xanthine are not required for growth. Subsp. Mesenteroides also require glutamic acid and valine.

=== Subsp. Cremoris ===
This strain grows best between 18 and 25 °C. This strain can ferment citrate into acetoin and diacetyl. Most strains of this subspecies cannot ferment sucrose. Of the three subspecies, this ferments the least kinds of carbohydrates. All strains can ferment glucose and lactose; galactose and maltose is strain specific. This strain requires more nutrients, riboflavin, pyridoxal, folic acid, uracil and a combination of uracil, adenine, and xanthine are required.

=== Subsp. Dextranicum ===
This strain is similar to Subsp. Mesenteroides, the optimum temperature of 20 and 30 °C. It can also ferment glucose, fructose, lactose, maltose, sucrose and trehalose. There is also a variation by strain for requirements of riboflavin, pyridoxal and folic acid. Some strains also required a combination of uracil, guanine, adenine and xanthine.
