= Leuconostoc lactis =

Scientific classification
- Domain: Bacteria
- Kingdom: Bacillati
- Phylum: Bacillota
- Class: Bacilli
- Order: Lactobacillales
- Family: Lactobacillaceae
- Genus: Leuconostoc
- Species: L. lactis

Binomial name
- Leuconostoc lactis Garvie, 1960

Synonyms
- Leuconostoc argentinum

Species of bacteria

Leuconostoc lactis is a species of lactic acid bacteria that performs fermentation in acidic conditions, like those found in dairy products such as cheese and yogurt, and tend to culture best at moderate temperatures around 30 °C. L. lactis typically produces volatile butter-like compounds that are typically used in fermented dairy products, as well as dextran-like exopolysaccharide in sourdough.

== Microbiology ==
Leuconostoc lactis is a Gram-positive, non-motile, lactic acid bacterium that thrive best in acidic conditions and moderate temperatures. L. lactis is capable of acidifying culture media through lactose fermentation to pH levels of 4.0-4.1, and milk to levels below 5.4. The availability of citrate to co-metabolize with lactose allows for L. lactis to maintain an intercellular pH of above 6.0 when lactose concentrations are high. The maintenance of higher pH within the bacterial cell is important for the function of lactate dehydrogenase, and the K_{m} for pyruvate and NADH, as well as the V_{max} of the enzyme decreases by up to 30 fold as the intercellular pH drops from 8.0-5.0.

Due to the acidic conditions that arise from the cultivation of the bacteria, L. lactis is often a starter culture for the fermentation of dairy products into products like cheese and sour cream. L. lactis is one of the most commonly found bacterial cultures in regions like Romania that heavily depend on fermented dairy products.

== Pathology ==
Certain subspecies of L. lactis have the potential to produce glycosyltransferase, which allows for a variety of oligosaccharides and gluco-oligosaccharides to be produced. These macromolecules can be recognized and responded to by mammalian immune systems. These oligosaccharides have been found to increase several notable immune response factors, such as phosphorylated P38, ERK1/2, and JNK.

Leuconostoc lactis is found in a variety of fermenting vegetable and dairy products. The bacteria can also become an opportunistic pathogen with intrinsic resistance to traditional antibiotics like vancomycin and teicoplanin. There has been at least one recorded case of a 4 year old patient presenting an acute fever with no other symptoms. Blood culture revealed L. lactis infection and the administered treatment consisted of intravenous ceftriaxone and gentamicin, and subsequent oral amoxicillin.
