= Lactic acid fermentation =

Series of interconnected biochemical reactions

The L enantiomer of lactic acid

This animation focuses on one molecule of glucose turning into pyruvate then into lactic acid. In the process there is one 6-carbon glucose molecule and 2 NAD+ molecules. 2 phosphates attach to the ends of the glucose molecule, then glucose is split into 2 3-carbon pyruvate precursors. Subsequently, NAD+ molecules are converted into 2 NADH and additional phosphate groups are attached to the carbons. Then ADP comes and takes the phosphates, creating 2 ATP molecules. The pyruvate is turned into 2 lactate molecules, which convert NADH back to NAD+. The process then repeats, starting with another glucose molecule.

Lactic acid fermentation is a metabolic process by which glucose or other six-carbon sugars (also, disaccharides of six-carbon sugars, e.g. sucrose or lactose) are converted into cellular energy and the metabolite lactate, which is lactic acid in solution. It is an anaerobic fermentation reaction that occurs in some bacteria and animal cells, such as muscle cells. It is also used extensively to preserve food and create novel flavours. Despite the name, milk is not required by this process.

If oxygen is present in the cell, many organisms will bypass fermentation and undergo cellular respiration; however, facultative anaerobic organisms will both ferment and undergo respiration in the presence of oxygen. Sometimes even when oxygen is present and aerobic metabolism is happening in the mitochondria, if pyruvate is building up faster than it can be metabolized, the fermentation will happen anyway.

Lactate dehydrogenase catalyzes the interconversion of pyruvate and lactate with concomitant interconversion of NADH and NAD^{+}.

In homolactic fermentation, one molecule of glucose is ultimately converted to two molecules of lactic acid. Heterolactic fermentation, by contrast, yields carbon dioxide and ethanol in addition to lactic acid, in a process called the phosphoketolase pathway.

== History ==
Chemical analysis of archaeological finds shows that milk fermentation had been used since prehistory; its first applications were probably a part of the Neolithic Revolution. Since milk naturally contains lactic acid bacteria, the discovery of the fermentation process was quite evident, since it happens spontaneously at an adequate temperature. The problem of these first farmers was that fresh milk is nearly indigestible by adults, so they had an interest to discover this mechanism. In fact, lactic acid bacteria contain the needed enzymes to digest lactose, and their populations multiply strongly during the fermentation. Therefore, milk fermented even a short time contains enough enzymes to digest the lactose molecules, after the milk is in the human body, which allows adults to consume it. Even safer was a longer fermentation, which was practiced for cheesemaking. This process was also discovered a very long time ago, which is proven by recipes for cheese production on Cuneiform scripts, the first written documents that exist, and later in Babylonian and Egyptian texts. There is a theory of competitive advantage related to fermented milk products. This theory suggests that the women of these first settled agricultural civilisations could shorten the time between two children thanks to the additional lactose uptake from milk consumption. This factor may have given them an important advantage to out-compete the hunter-gatherer societies.

With the increasing consumption of milk products these societies developed a lactase persistence by epigenetic inheritance, which means that the milk-digesting enzyme lactase was present in their bodies during the whole lifetime, so they could drink unfermented milk as adults too. This early habituation to lactose consumption in the first settler societies can still be observed today in regional differences of this mutation's concentration. It is estimated that about 65% of the world population still lacks it. Since these first societies came from regions around eastern Turkey to central Europe, the gene appears more frequently there and in North America, as it was settled by Europeans. It is because of the dominance of this mutation that Western cultures believe it is unusual to have a lactose intolerance, when it is in fact more common than the mutation. On the contrary, lactose intolerance is much more present in Asian countries.

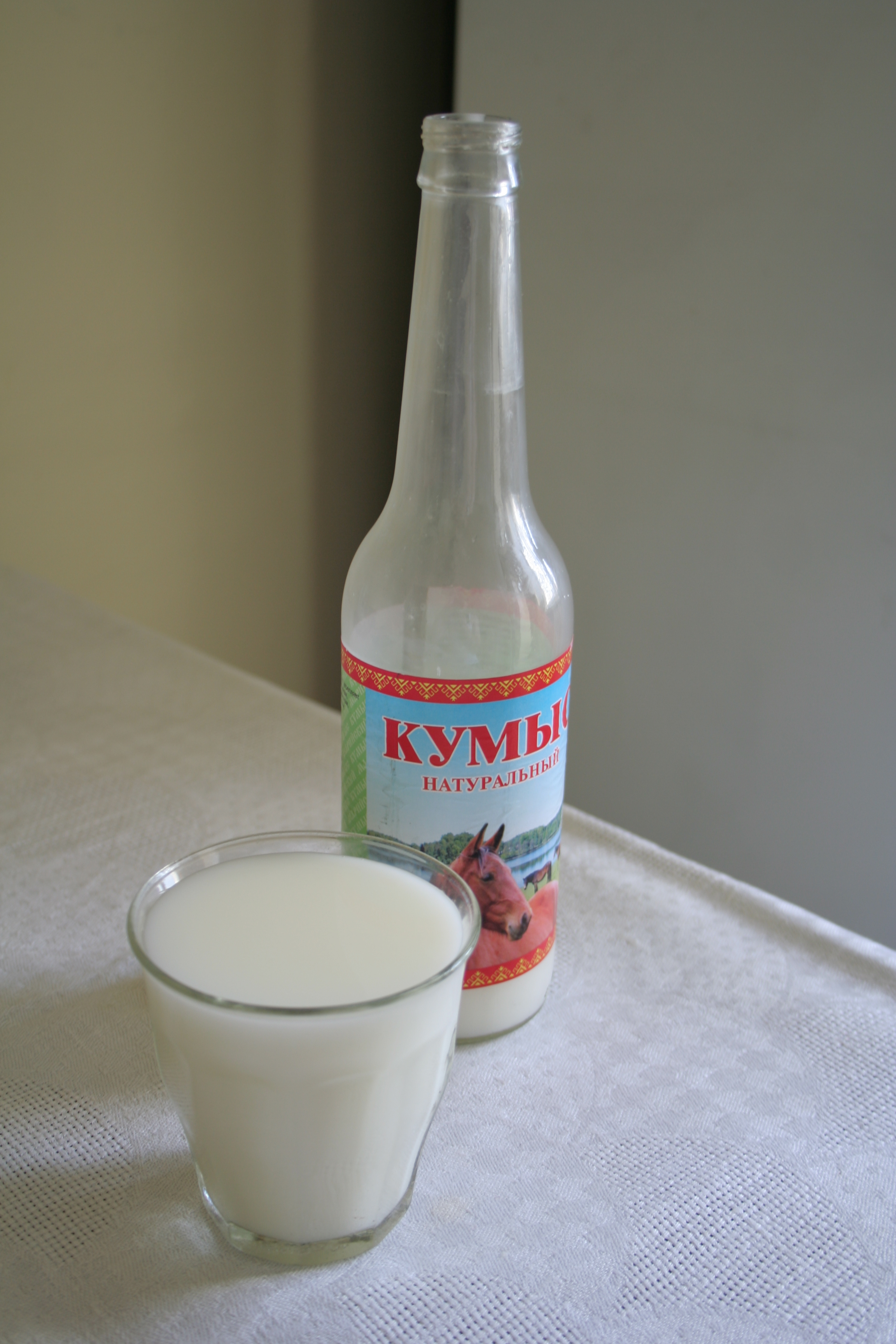
A bottle and glass of Kumis

Milk products and their fermentation have had an important influence on some cultures' development. This is the case in Mongolia, where people often practice a pastoral form of agriculture. The milk that they produce and consume in these cultures is mainly mare milk and has a long tradition. But not every part or product of the fresh milk has the same meaning. For instance, the fattier part on the top, the "deež", is seen as the most valuable part and is therefore often used to honor guests.

Very important with often a traditional meaning as well are fermentation products of mare milk, like for example the slightly-alcoholic yogurt kumis. Consumption of these peaks during cultural festivities such as the Mongolian lunar new year (in spring). The time of this celebration is called the "white month", which indicates that milk products (called "white food" together with starchy vegetables, in comparison to meat products, called "black food") are a central part of this tradition. The purpose of these festivities is to "close" the past year – clean the house or the yurt, honor the animals for having provided their food, and prepare everything for the coming summer season – to be ready to "open" the new year. Consuming white food in this festive context is a way to connect to the past and to a national identity, which is the Mongol Empire personified by Genghis Khan. During the time of this empire, the fermented mare milk was the drink to honor and thank warriors and leading persons, it was not meant for everybody. Although it eventually became a drink for normal people, it has kept its honorable meaning. Like many other traditions, this one feels the influence of globalization. Other products, like industrial yogurt, coming mainly from China and western countries, have tended to replace it more and more, mainly in urban areas. However, in rural and poorer regions it is still of great importance.

Although this chemical process had been used in food production for thousands of years, the mechanism of microbial lactic acid fermentation was not understood until much later. During the 19th century, several chemists discovered some fundamental concepts of organic chemistry. One of these was the French chemist Joseph Louis Gay-Lussac, who was especially interested in fermentation processes, and he passed this fascination to one of his best students, Justus von Liebig. With a difference of some years, each of them described, together with colleagues, the chemical structure of the lactic acid molecule as we know it today. They had a purely chemical understanding of the fermentation process; it could not be observed using a microscope, and could only be optimized by chemical catalyzers. In 1857, the French chemist Louis Pasteur first described lactic acid as the product of a microbial fermentation. During this time, he worked at the University of Lille, where a local distillery asked him for advice concerning some fermentation problems. Per chance and with the badly equipped laboratory he had at that time, he was able to discover that in this distillery, two fermentations were taking place, a lactic acid one and an alcoholic one, both induced by microorganisms. He then continued the research on these discoveries in Paris, where he also published his theories that presented a stable contradiction to the purely chemical version represented by Liebig and his followers. Even though Pasteur described some concepts that are still accepted today, Liebig refused to accept them. But even Pasteur himself wrote that he was "driven" to a completely new understanding of this chemical phenomenon. Although Pasteur didn't find every detail of this process, he still discovered the main mechanism of how microbial lactic acid fermentation works. He was the first to describe fermentation as a "form of life without air".

== Biochemistry ==
=== Homofermentative process ===
Homofermentative bacteria convert glucose to two molecules of lactate and use this reaction to perform substrate-level phosphorylation to make two molecules of ATP:

Glucose + 2 ADP + 2 P_{i} → 2 Lactate + 2 ATP

=== Heterofermentative process ===
Heterofermentative bacteria produce less lactate and less ATP, but produce several other end products:

Glucose + ADP + P_{i} → Lactate + Ethanol + CO_{2} + ATP

Examples include Leuconostoc mesenteroides, Lactobacillus bifermentous, and Leuconostoc lactis.

=== Bifidum pathway ===
Bifidobacterium bifidum utilizes a lactic acid fermentation pathway that produces more ATP than either homolactic fermentation or heterolactic fermentation:

2 Glucose + 5 ADP + 5 P_{i} → 3 Acetate + 2 Lactate + 5 ATP

== Major genera of lactose-fermenting bacteria ==
Some major bacterial strains identified as being able to ferment lactose are in the genera Escherichia, Citrobacter, Enterobacter and Klebsiella. All four of these groups fall underneath the family of Enterobacteriaceae. These four genera are able to be separated from each other by using biochemical testing, and simple biological tests are readily available. Apart from whole-sequence genomics, common tests include H2S production, motility and citrate use, indole, methyl red and Voges-Proskauer tests.

== Applications ==
=== Food ===
Lactic acid fermentation is used in many areas of the world to produce foods that cannot be produced through other methods. The most commercially important genus of lactic acid-fermenting bacteria is Lactobacillus, though other bacteria and even yeast are sometimes used. Two of the most common applications of lactic acid fermentation are in the production of yogurt and sauerkraut.

==== Pickles ====
Pickling in brine is a very common way to use lactic acid fermentation to aid in the preservation of food. Lactic acid bacteria (LAB) already exists as part of the natural flora in most vegetables, so by creating a selective environment of oxygen-poor brine, LAB will dominate in growth and convert sugars to lactic acid.

Silage fermentation uses the same principle of creating an anaerobic environment. Different types of LAB will produce different types of silage fermentation.

===== Kimchi =====
Kimchi also uses lactic acid fermentation.

===== Sauerkraut =====
Lactic acid fermentation is also used in the production of sauerkraut. The main type of bacteria used in the production of sauerkraut is of the genus Leuconostoc.

As in yogurt, when the acidity rises due to lactic acid-fermenting organisms, many other pathogenic microorganisms are killed. The bacteria produce lactic acid, as well as simple alcohols and other hydrocarbons. These may then combine to form esters, contributing to the unique flavor of sauerkraut.

==== Fermented fish ====
In some Asian cuisines, fish is traditionally fermented with rice to produce lactic acid that preserves the fish. Examples of these dishes include burong isda of the Philippines; narezushi of Japan; and pla ra of Thailand. The same process is also used for shrimp in the Philippines in the dish known as balao-balao.

==== Sour beer ====
Lactic acid is a component in the production of sour beers, including Lambics and Berliner Weisses.

==== Dairy ====
A variety of dairy products are made using lactic acid fermentation, including yogurt, kefir, skyr, buttermilk, and sour cream.

The main method of producing yogurt is through the lactic acid fermentation of milk with harmless bacteria. The primary bacteria used are typically Lactobacillus bulgaricus and Streptococcus thermophilus, and United States as well as European law requires all yogurts to contain these two cultures (though others may be added as probiotic cultures). These bacteria produce lactic acid in the milk culture, decreasing its pH and causing it to congeal. The bacteria also produce compounds that give yogurt its distinctive flavor. An additional effect of the lowered pH is the incompatibility of the acidic environment with many other types of harmful bacteria. Yogurt labeled as "probiotic" may also contain other bacteria, such as Lactobacillus acidophilus.

=== Physiology ===
==== Microbiomes ====
Lactobacillus fermentation and accompanying production of acid provides a protective vaginal microbiome that protects against the proliferation of pathogenic organisms.

The vaginal environment is heavily influenced by lactic acid producing bacteria. Lactobacilli spp. that live in the vaginal canal assist in pH control. If the pH in the vagina becomes too basic, more lactic acid will be produced to lower the pH back to a more acidic level. Lactic acid producing bacteria also act as a protective barrier against possible pathogens such as bacterial vaginosis and vaginitis species, different fungi, and protozoa through the production of hydrogen peroxide, and antibacterial compounds. It is unclear if further use of lactic acid, through fermentation, in the vaginal canal is present.

==== Lactate fermentation and muscle cramps ====
Human (and other eukaryote) cells can produce ATP from glucose without oxygen in a process called glycolysis. This is not as efficient as respiration, but provides a high instantaneous output, and is hence used by some muscle cells. Glycolysis consumes ADP, Pi, glucose, and NAD+ to produce ATP, pyruvate, and NADH. Through lactate fermentation, pyruvate and NADH are turned into lactate and NAD+, thereby regenerating the NAD+ required for more glycolysis.

During the 1990s, the lactic acid hypothesis was created to explain why people experienced burning or muscle cramps that occurred during and after intense exercise. The hypothesis proposes that a lack of oxygen in muscle cells results in a switch from cellular respiration to fermentation. Lactic acid created as a byproduct of fermentation of pyruvate from glycolysis accumulates in muscles causing a burning sensation and cramps.

Research from 2006 has suggested that acidosis isn't the main cause of muscle cramps. Instead cramps may be due to a lack of potassium in muscles, leading to contractions under high stress.

Animals, in fact, do not produce lactic acid during fermentation. Despite the common use of the term lactic acid in the literature, the byproduct of fermentation in animal cells is lactate.

Another change to the lactic acid hypothesis is that when sodium lactate is inside of the body, there is a higher period of exhaustion in the host after a period of exercise.

==== Benefits for the lactose intolerant ====
In small amounts, lactic acid is good for the human body by providing energy and substrates while it moves through the cycle. In lactose intolerant people, the fermentation of lactose to lactic acid has been shown in small studies to help lactose intolerant people. The process of fermentation limits the amount of lactose available. With the amount of lactose lowered, there is less build up inside of the body, reducing bloating. Success of lactic fermentation was most evident in yogurt cultures. Further studies are being conducted on other milk products like acidophilus milk.
