= Sauerkraut =

Finely sliced and fermented cabbage

Sauerkraut (/ˈsaʊ.ərˌkraʊt/; German: [ˈzaʊ.ɐˌkʁaʊt], lit. 'sour cabbage') is finely cut raw white cabbage that has been fermented by various lactic acid bacteria. It has a long shelf life and a distinctive sour flavor, both of which result from the lactic acid formed when the bacteria ferment the carbohydrates in the cabbage leaves.

== History ==
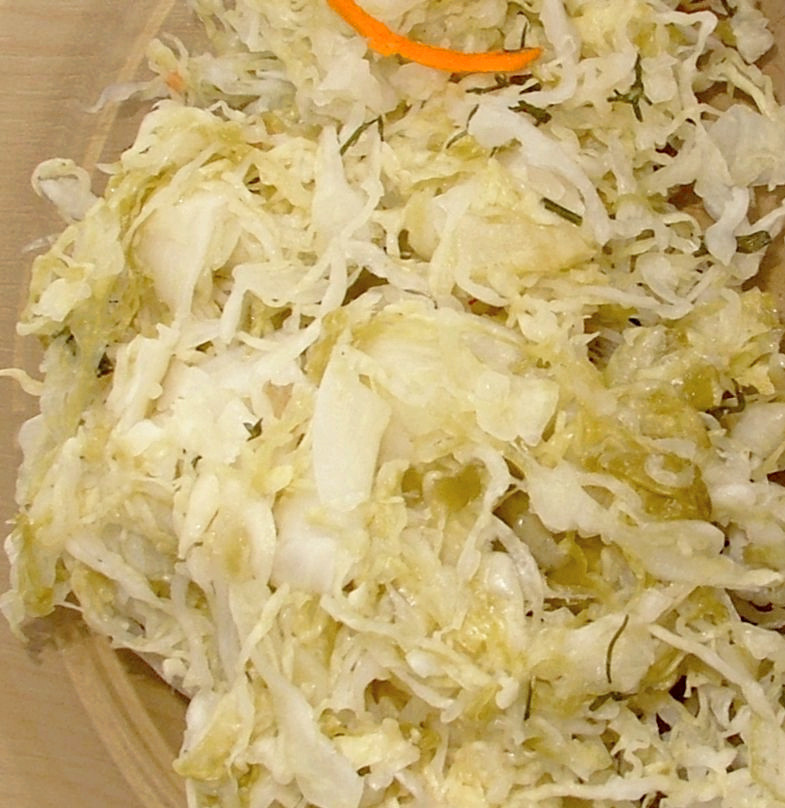
Polish kapusta kiszona

Fermented foods have a long history in many cultures. The Roman writers Cato (in his De agri cultura) and Columella (in his De re Rustica) mentioned preserving cabbages and turnips with salt. According to Wilhelm Holzapfel et al., Plinius the Elder, writing in the first century AD, is reputed to have been the first writer to describe the making of sauerkraut by preserving what the Romans called salt cabbage in earthen vessels. Popular folklore has imagined that sauerkraut was introduced to Europe by the trade networks formed across Eurasia by the Golden Horde. However, according to Mack and Surina (2005), there is no evidence to support this theory, nor any evidence that fermented cabbage arrived from an East Asian source, and there is evidence of sauerkraut production in Europe dating back to the early period of the Western Roman Empire.

Before frozen foods, refrigeration, and cheap transport from warmer areas became readily available in Northern, Central, and Eastern Europe, sauerkraut – like other preserved foods – provided a source of certain nutrients (eg, vitamin C) during the winter. Captain James Cook took sauerkraut on his sea voyages to prevent scurvy.

== Name ==
The English name is borrowed from German, where it means "sour cabbage". The dish did not originate in Germany. Some claim fermented cabbage, Suan cai, was already produced in the days of the building of the Great Wall of China. However, the Romans pickled forms of cabbage, and were the more likely source of modern-day European sauerkraut. It became popular in Central and Eastern European cuisines, and countries including the Netherlands, where it is known as zuurkool, and France, where the name became choucroute. According to Mack and Surina (2005), the Slavic peoples of Europe likely discovered fermented cabbage on their own.

The names in Slavic and other Central and Eastern European languages have similar meanings with the German word: "fermented cabbage" (Armenian: թթու կաղամբ, Albanian: lakër turshi, Azerbaijani: kələm turşusu, Belarusian: квашаная капуста, Czech: kysané zelí, Lithuanian: rauginti kopūstai, Polish: kapusta kiszona/ kapusta kwaszona, Russian: квашеная капуста/кислая капуста, romanized: kvašenaja kapusta, Turkish: lahana turşusu, Romanian: varză murată, Persian: kalam torş, Bulgarian: кисело зеле, Estonian: hapukapsas, Hungarian: savanyúkáposzta, Latvian: skābēti kāposti, Macedonian: расол / кисела зелка, Serbo-Croatian: кисели купус / кисело зеље, kiseli kupus / kiselo zelje, Slovak: kyslá kapusta, Slovene: kislo zelje, Ukrainian: квашена капуста, kvashena kapusta).

The word Kraut, derived from this food, is a derogatory term for the German people. During World War I, due to concerns the American public would reject a product with a German name, American sauerkraut makers relabeled their product as "liberty cabbage" for the duration of the war.

== Production ==
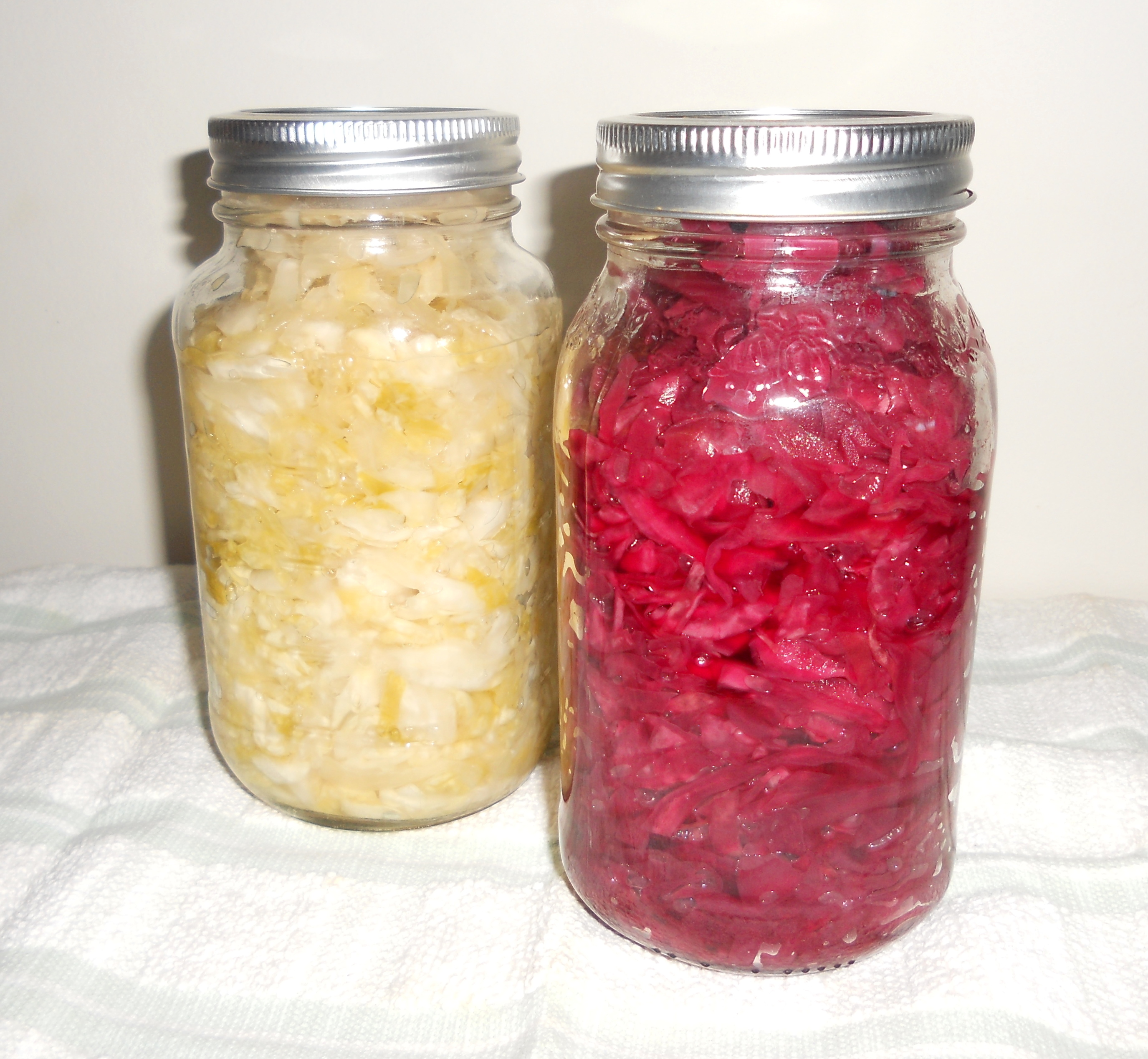
Homemade sauerkraut

Sauerkraut is made by a process of pickling called lactic acid fermentation, analogous to how traditional (not heat-treated) pickled cucumbers and kimchi are made. The cabbage is finely shredded, layered with salt, and left to ferment. Fully cured sauerkraut keeps for several months in an airtight container stored at 15 °C (60 °F) or below. In temperate climates, this allows storage over the full winter and early-spring. Neither refrigeration nor pasteurization is required, although these treatments prolong storage life.

Fermentation by lactobacilli is introduced naturally, as these air-borne bacteria culture on raw cabbage leaves where they grow. Yeasts also are present, and may yield soft sauerkraut of poor flavor when the fermentation temperature is too high. The fermentation process has three phases, collectively sometimes referred to as population dynamics. In the first phase, anaerobic bacteria such as Klebsiella and Enterobacter lead the fermentation, and begin producing an acidic environment that favors later bacteria. The second phase starts as the acid levels become too high for many bacteria, and Leuconostoc mesenteroides and other Leuconostoc species take dominance. In the third phase, various Lactobacillus species, including L. brevis and L. plantarum, ferment any remaining sugars, further lowering the pH. (Note: The pH of completely cured sauerkraut is about 3.6.) Properly cured sauerkraut is sufficiently acidic to prevent a favorable environment for the growth of Clostridium botulinum, the toxins of which cause botulism.

A 2004 genomic study found an unexpectedly large diversity of lactic acid bacteria in sauerkraut, and that previous studies had oversimplified this diversity. Weissella was found to be a major organism in the initial, heterofermentative stage, up to day 7. It was also found that Lactobacillus brevis and Pediococcus pentosaceus had smaller population numbers in the first 14 days than previous studies had reported.

The Dutch sauerkraut industry found that combining a new batch of sauerkraut with an old batch resulted in an exceedingly sour product. This sourdough process is known as "backslopping" or "inoculum enrichment"; when used in making sauerkraut, first- and second-stage population dynamics, important to developing flavor, are bypassed. This is due primarily to the greater initial activity of species L. plantarum.

== Regional varieties ==
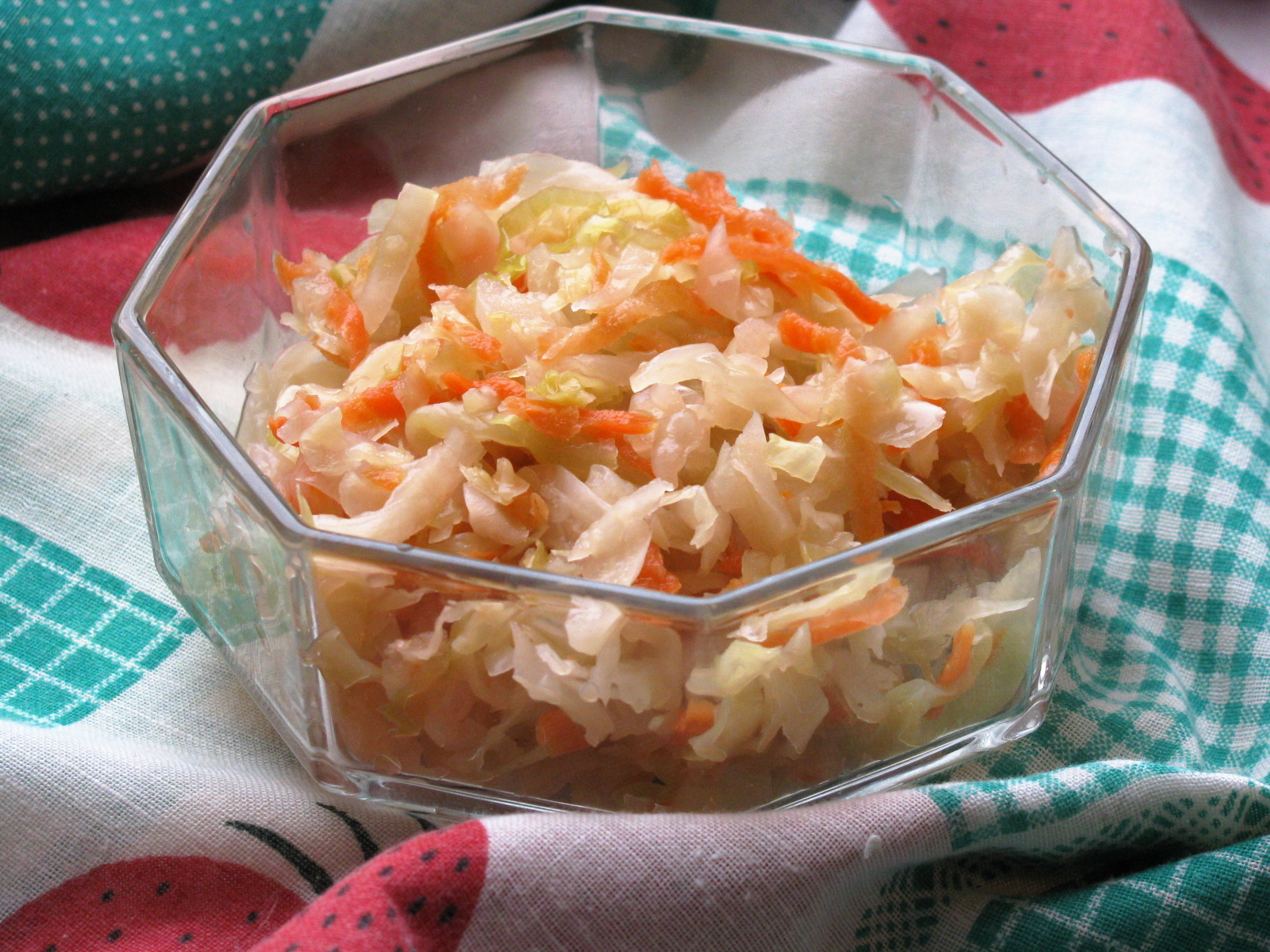
Eastern European-style sauerkraut pickled with carrots and served as a salad

In Armenian, Belarusian, Estonian, Latvian, Lithuanian, Czech, Slovak, Polish, Russian, and Ukrainian cuisine, chopped cabbage is often pickled together with shredded carrots. Other ingredients may include caraway seeds, whole or quartered apples for additional flavour or cranberry for flavour and better keeping (the benzoic acid in cranberries is a common preservative). Bell peppers and beets are added in some recipes for colour. The resulting sauerkraut salad is typically served cold, as zakuski or a side dish.

A homemade type of very mild sauerkraut is available, where white cabbage is pickled with salt in a refrigerator for only three to seven days. This process results in very little lactic acid production. Sometimes in Russia double fermentation is used, with the initial step producing an exceptionally sour product, which is then "corrected" by adding 30–50% more fresh cabbage and fermenting the mix again. The flavor additives like apples, beets, cranberries, and sometimes even watermelons are usually introduced at this step.

Sauerkraut may be used as a filling for Polish pierogi, Ukrainian varenyky, Russian pirogi and pirozhki. Sauerkraut is also the central ingredient in traditional soups, such as shchi (a national dish of Russia), kwaśnica (Poland), kapustnica (Slovakia), kapusniak (Ukraine) and zelňačka (Czech Republic resp. Moravian). It is an ingredient of Polish bigos (a hunter's stew).

In Germany and Austria, cooked sauerkraut is often flavored with juniper berries or caraway seeds; apples and white wine are added in popular variations. In South Tyrol, it is made with juniper berries, extra-virgin olive oil and smoked pancetta. Traditionally it is served warm, with pork (such as eisbein, schweinshaxe, Kassler) or sausages (smoked or fried sausages, Frankfurter Würstchen, Vienna sausages, black pudding), accompanied typically by roasted or steamed potatoes or dumplings (knödel or schupfnudel). Similar recipes are common in other Central European cuisines. The Czech national dish vepřo knedlo zelo consists of roast pork with knedlíky and sauerkraut.

In Bulgaria, Montenegro, Serbia, Bosnia, Croatia, North Macedonia and Slovenia, usually the whole cabbage heads are pickled. They can be used for many dishes, from a simple salad made of shredded cabbage seasoned with paprika or black pepper, to cabbage rolls such as sarma or arambaši. In Bulgarian cuisine sauerkraut is known as кисело зеле, and many traditional Bulgarian dishes are made with sauerkraut, like свинско със зеле (pork with sauerkraut), сарми (cabbage rolls), зелник (Bulgarian banitsa with sauerkraut), капама (sausage and meat with cabbage rolls and sauerkraut in clay pot), боб със зеле (beans with sauerkraut) and салата от кисело зеле с червен пипер (sauerkraut salad with paprika). In northern parts of Serbia and Croatia, it is often added to bean soup. In central Serbia, a local specialty called "wedding cabbage" is made by slowly stewing roughly cut cabbage with at least three kinds of meats, lean, fatty, and smoked.

In Szeklerland it is an essential part of székelygulyás and the erdélyi rakott káposzta (a type of casserole).

In Romania, the local type of sauerkraut (varza murata, whole pickled cabbage heads) are used as wrap for the national dish, sarmale, a Turkish-inspired roll, made of pickled cabbage leaves with minced pork and rice, having its own personality and very distinct in taste from its Ottoman predecessor.

In France, sauerkraut is the main ingredient of the Alsatian meal choucroute garnie (French for 'dressed sauerkraut'), sauerkraut with sausages (Strasbourg sausages, smoked Morteau or Montbéliard sausages), charcuterie (bacon, ham, etc.), and often potatoes.

In Chile it is called chucrut and is a common topping for sandwiches and hotdogs, especially for completos.

Sauerkraut, along with pork, is eaten traditionally in Pennsylvania on New Year's Day. The tradition, started by the Pennsylvania Dutch, is thought to bring good luck for the upcoming year. Sauerkraut is also used in American cuisine as a condiment upon various foods, such as sandwiches and hot dogs. In Maryland, particularly in Baltimore and on the Eastern Shore, sauerkraut is a traditional accompaniment for the Thanksgiving turkey.

As Europeans, especially Germans, emigrated to other countries, many of them continued making and eating sauerkraut around the world. It has also been popular among Ashkenazi Jews.

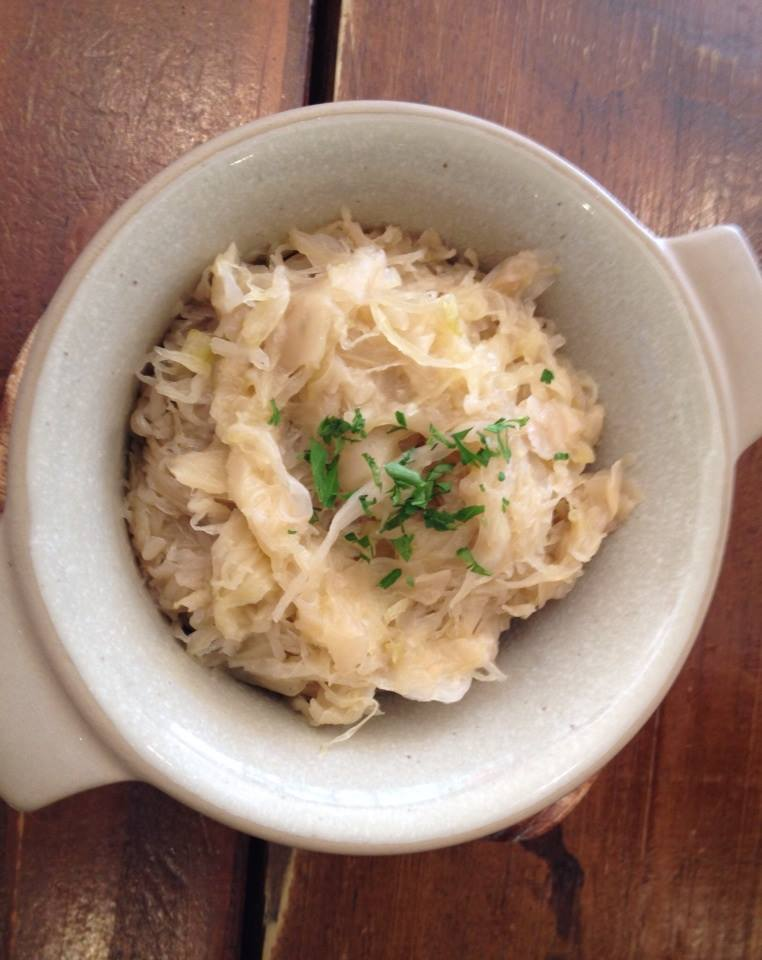
Cooked sauerkraut

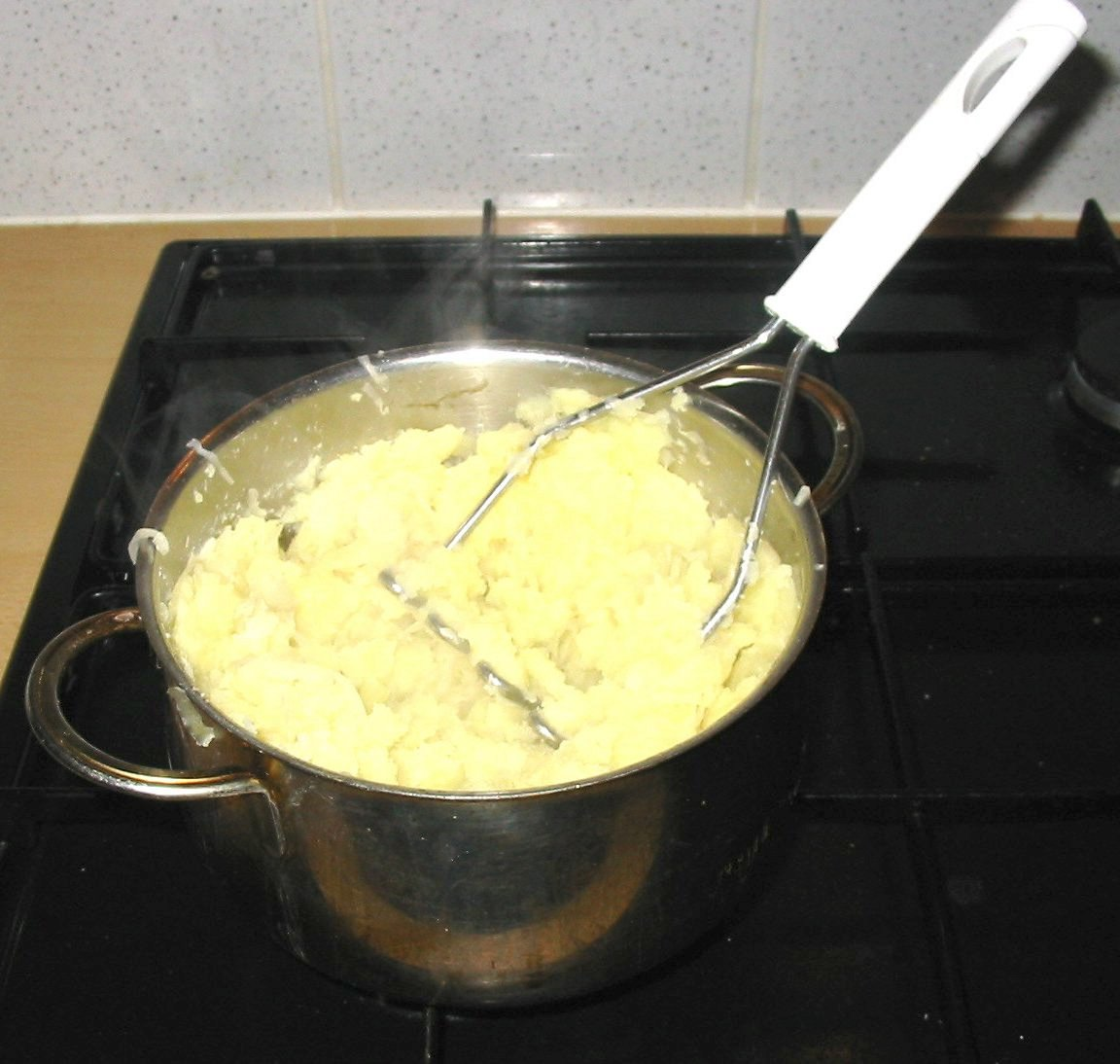
Dutch zuurkoolstamppot includes sauerkraut mashed with potatoes and is traditionally served with rookworst.

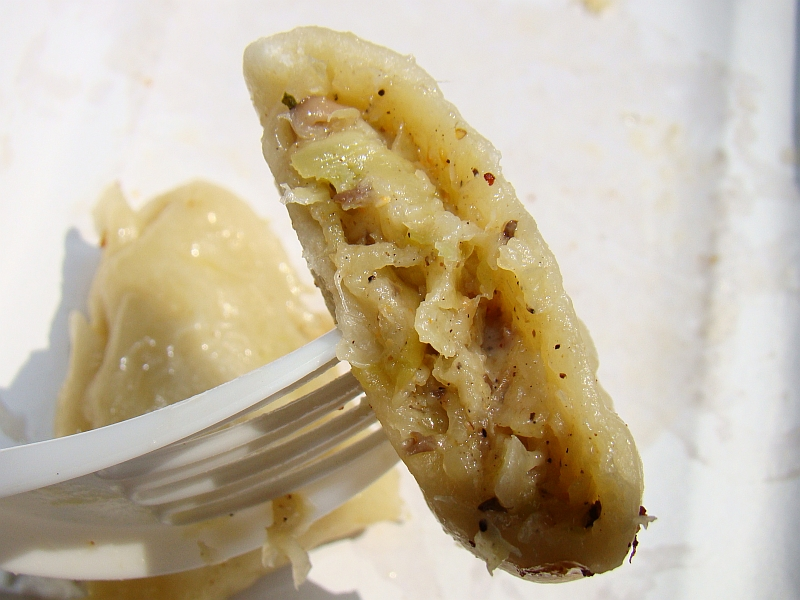
Pierogi with sauerkraut

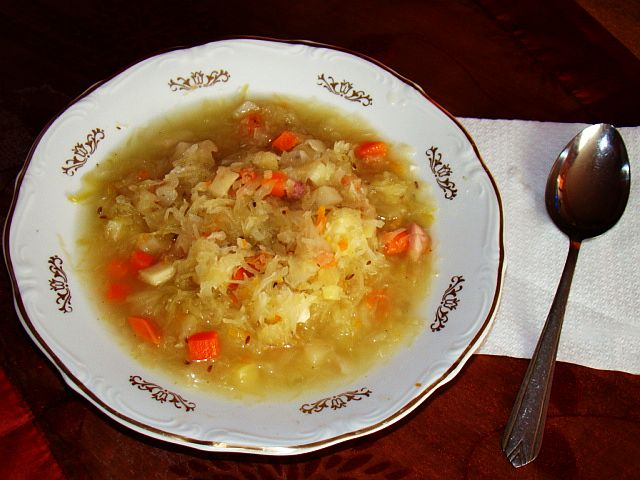
Kapuśniak made with sauerkraut

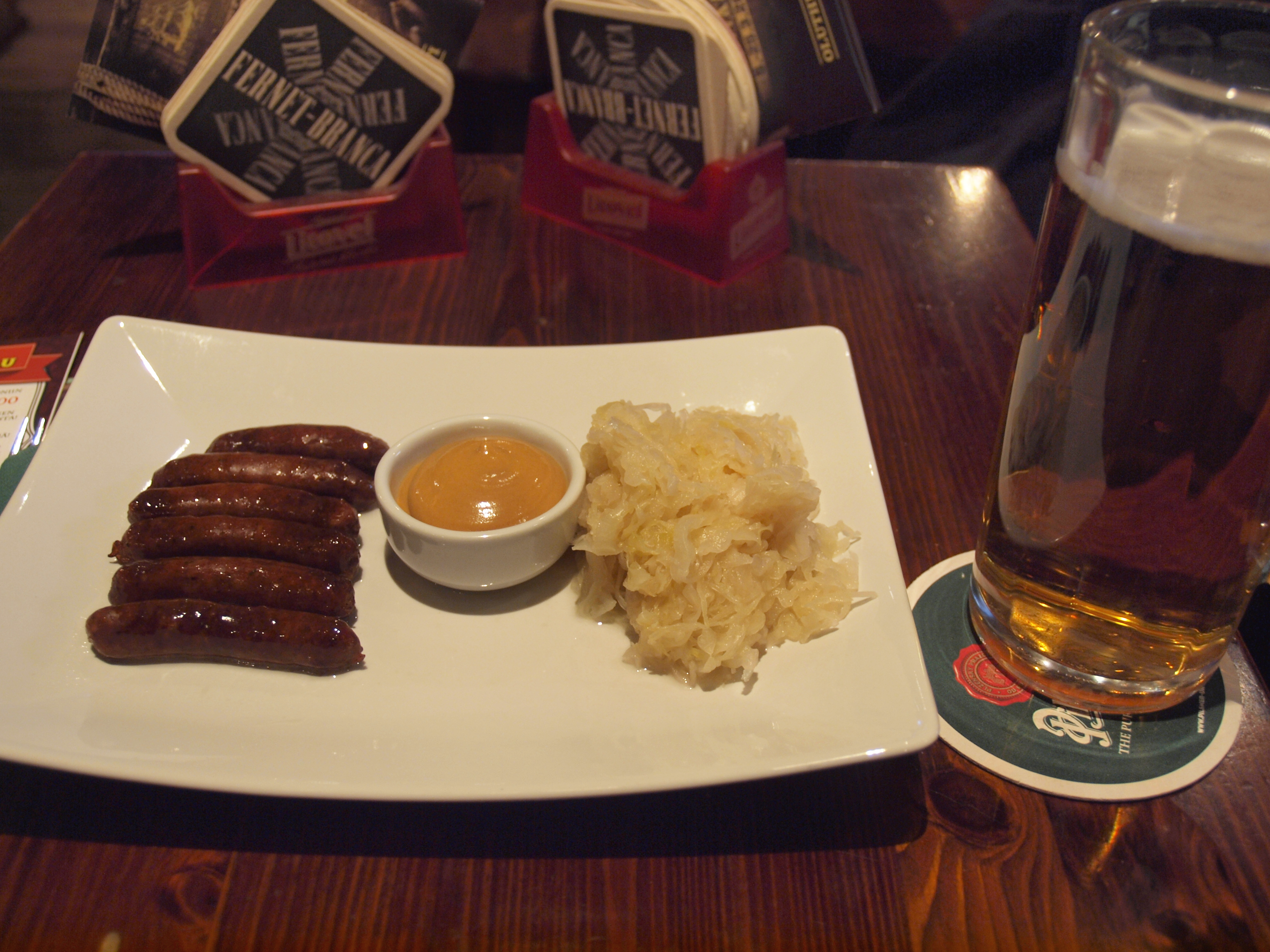
Central European-style sauerkraut and sausages is a popular snack dish in pubs.

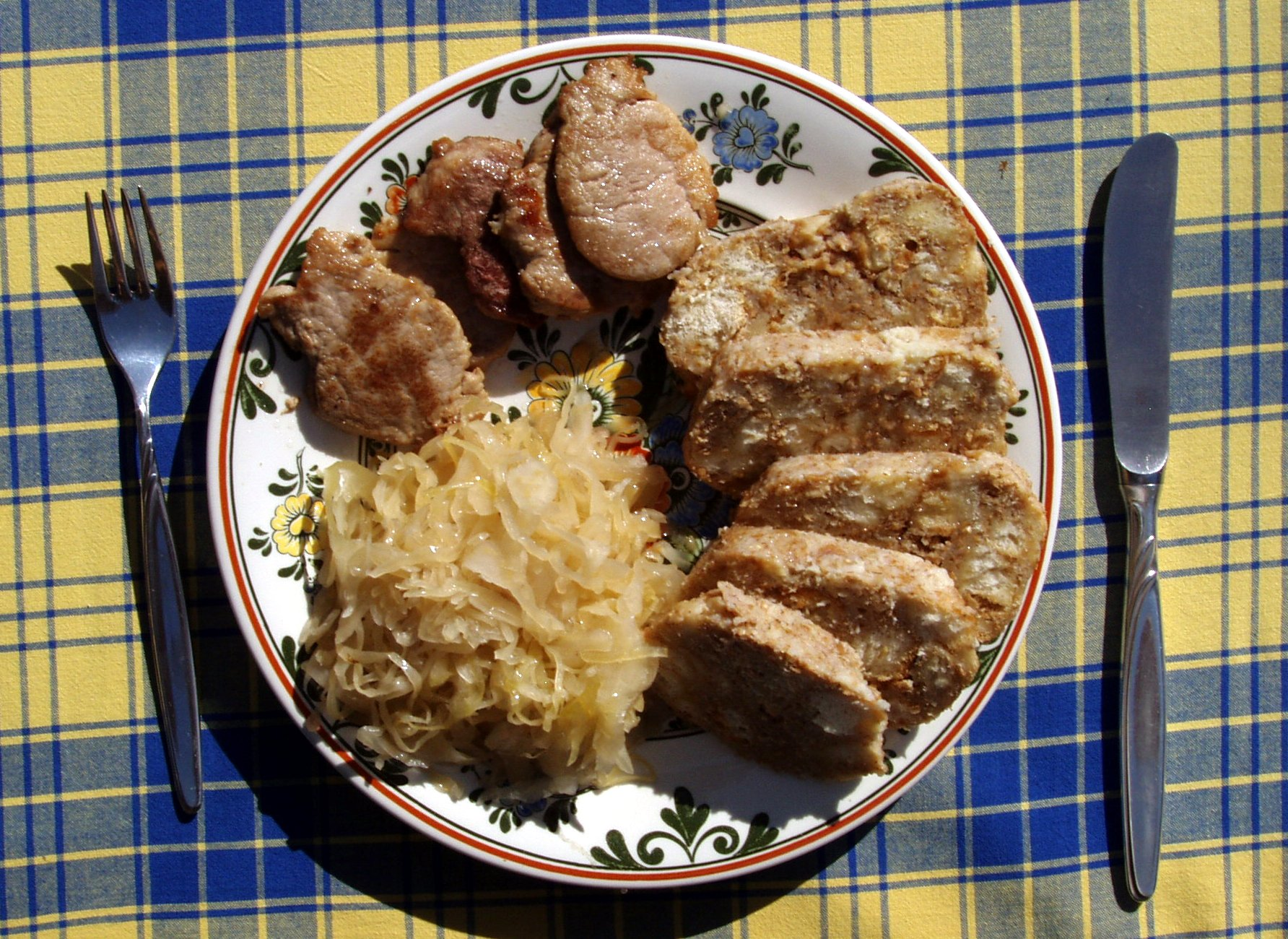
Czech Vepřo-knedlo-zelo

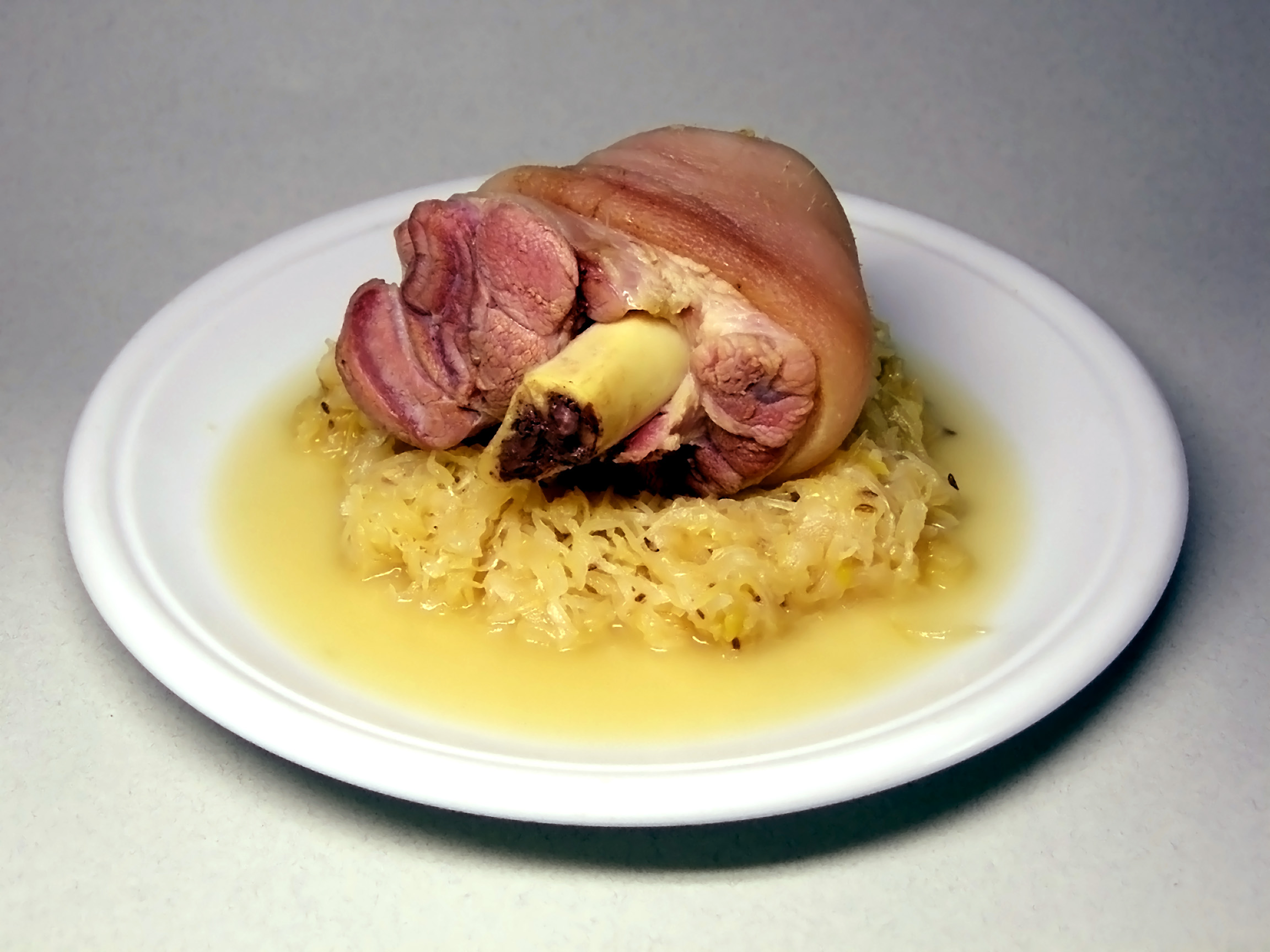
Pickled Eisbein served with sauerkraut

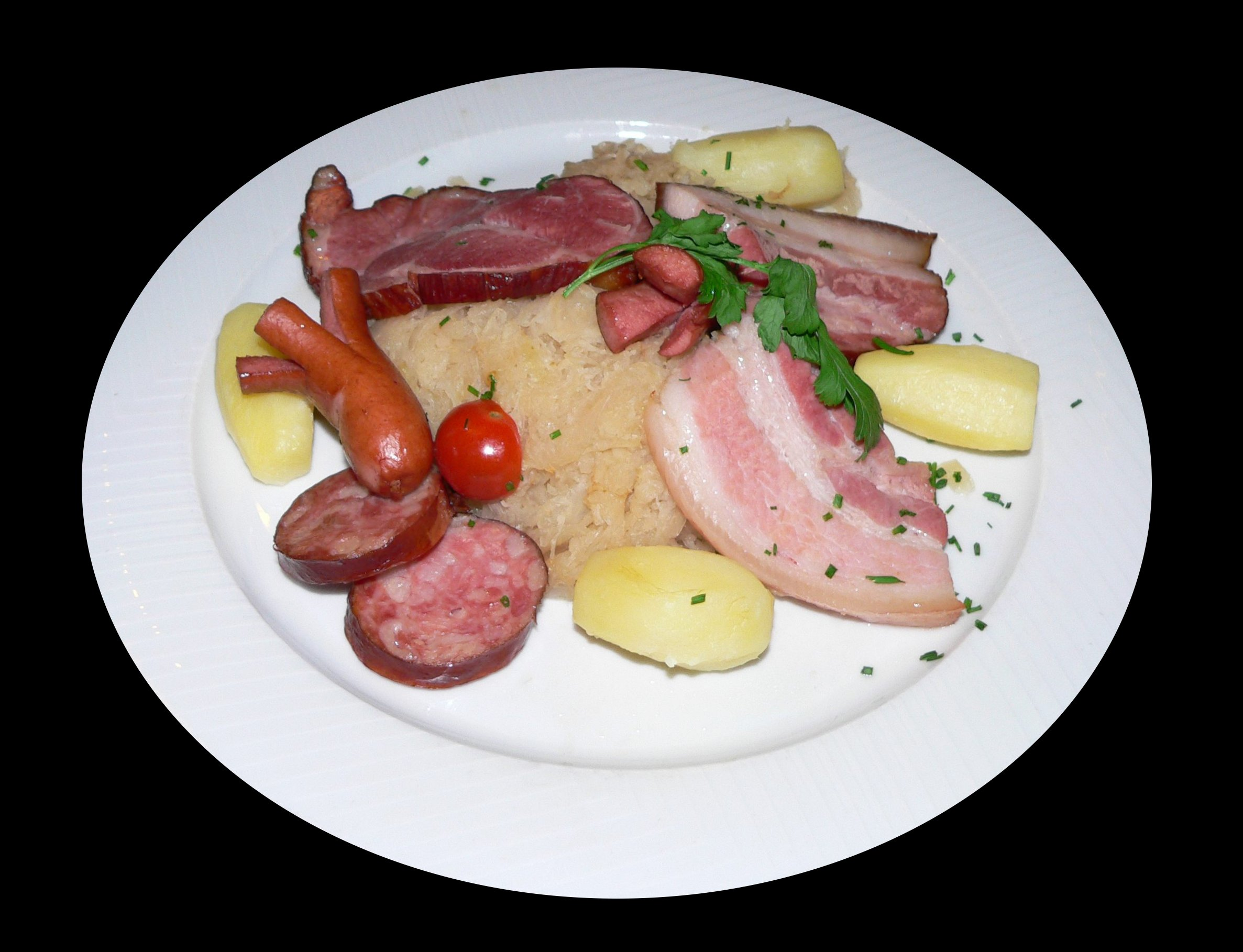
Alsatian Choucroute garnie

== Health effects ==
=== Benefits ===
Sauerkraut, canned, solids and liquids
Nutritional value per 100 g (3.5 oz)
- Energy: 78 kJ (19 kcal)
- Carbohydrates: 4.3 g
- Sugars: 1.8 g
- Dietary fiber: 2.9 g
- Fat: 0.14 g
- Protein: 0.9 g
Vitamins and minerals
Vitamins	Quantity %DV^{†}
Vitamin B6	8% 0.13 mg
Vitamin C	17% 15 mg
Vitamin K	11% 13 μg
Minerals	Quantity %DV^{†}
Iron	8% 1.5 mg
Sodium	29% 661 mg
- Other constituents: Quantity
- Water: 92 g
- ^{†}Percentages estimated using US recommendations for adults.

Many health benefits have been claimed for sauerkraut:

- It is a high source of vitamins K and (if uncooked) C; the fermentation process increases the bioavailability of nutrients rendering sauerkraut even more nutritious than the original cabbage. It is also low in food energy and high in calcium and magnesium, and it is a very good source of dietary fiber, folate, iron, potassium, copper and manganese.
- If unpasteurized and uncooked, sauerkraut also contains live lactobacilli and beneficial microbes and is rich in enzymes. Fiber and probiotics improve digestion and promote the growth of healthy bowel flora, protecting against many diseases of the digestive tract.
- During the American Civil War, the physician John Jay Terrell (1829–1922) was able to successfully reduce the death rate from disease among prisoners of war; he attributed this to feeding his patients raw sauerkraut.
- Sauerkraut and its juice is a time-honored folk remedy for canker sores. The treatment is to rinse the mouth with sauerkraut juice for about 30 seconds several times a day, or place a wad of sauerkraut against the affected area for a minute or so before chewing and swallowing the sauerkraut.
- In 2002, the Journal of Agriculture and Food Chemistry reported that Finnish researchers found the isothiocyanates produced in sauerkraut fermentation inhibit the growth of cancer cells in test tube and animal studies. A Polish study in 2010 concluded that "induction of the key detoxifying enzymes by cabbage juices, particularly sauerkraut, may be responsible for their chemopreventive activity demonstrated by epidemiological studies and in animal models".
- Sauerkraut was one of the foods taken by English explorer James Cook on his first and second pacific voyages as a way to prevent scurvy.
- Romani people consider it a lucky food.

=== Disadvantages ===
Excessive consumption of sauerkraut may lead to bloating and flatulence due to the trisaccharide raffinose, which the human small intestine cannot break down. This does not negatively affect long-term health, although it might be uncomfortable. Additionally, sauerkraut has a very high sodium content.

== Similar foods ==
Many other vegetables are preserved by a similar fermentation pickling process:

- Achaar in India, Bangladesh, Nepal, and Pakistan
- Atsara in the Philippines
- Brovada in Friuli, northern Italy
- Curtido in El Salvador
- Dill pickles in eastern and central Europe
- Encurtido in Central America
- Kimchi in Korea
- Silage, a feed for cattle
- Suan cai in northeastern China
- Tsukemono in Japan
- Kabichima in The Caribbean
- Kiseli kupus in Bosnia, Serbia, Croatia, and Bulgaria

== See also ==
- Baiuvarii
- Coleslaw
- Foods containing tyramine – Trace amine
- List of ancient dishes and foods
- List of cabbage dishes
- List of fermented foods
- Sauerkraut missions
- Suan cai – Traditional Chinese pickled vegetables
- Whole sour cabbage – Fermented vegetable preserve
- Politically motivated food name changes

== Bibliography ==
- USDA Canning Guides, Volume 7
- "rec.foods.preserving FAQ".
- Aubert, Claude (1999). Keeping Food Fresh: Old World Techniques & Recipes. Chelsea Green Publishing Company. ISBN 978-1-890132-10-1.
- Fallon, Sally; Enig, Mary G. (2001). Nourishing Traditions...[westonaprice.org; newtrendspublishing.com]. New Trends Publishing. ISBN 978-0-9670897-3-7.
- Katz, Sandor Ellix (2003). Wild Fermentation: The Flavor, Nutrition, and Craft of Live-Culture Foods. Chelsea Green Publishing Company. ISBN 978-1-931498-23-4.
- Kaufmann, Klaus (2001). Making Sauerkraut and Pickled Vegetables at Home. Book Publishing Company. ISBN 978-1-55312-037-7. Archived from the original on 28 June 2009.
