= List of microorganisms used in food and beverage preparation =

== List of useful microorganisms used in the preparation of food and beverages ==
MICROORGANISM	TYPE ( Bacterium / Fungus )	FOOD / BEVERAGE	REFERENCE(S)
Acetobacter aceti	bacterium	chocolate	
Acetobacter aceti	bacterium	vinegar	
Acetobacter cerevisiae	bacterium	beer	
Acetobacter fabarum	bacterium	chocolate	
Acetobacter fabarum	bacterium	coffee	
Acetobacter lovaniensis	bacterium	vegetable pickle	
Acetobacter malorum	bacterium	vinegar	
Acetobacter orientalis	bacterium	vegetable pickle	
Acetobacter pasteurianus	bacterium	chocolate	
Acetobacter pasteurianus	bacterium	vinegar	
Acetobacter pomorum	bacterium	vinegar	
Acetobacter syzygii	bacterium	chocolate	
Acetobacter syzygii	bacterium	vinegar	
Acetobacter tropicalis	bacterium	chocolate	
Acetobacter tropicalis	bacterium	coffee	
Arthrobacter arilaitensis	bacterium	cheese (smear-ripened)	
Arthrobacter bergerei	bacterium	cheese (smear-ripened)	
Arthrobacter globiformis	bacterium	cheese (smear-ripened)	
Arthrobacter nicotianae	bacterium	cheese (smear-ripened)	
Arthrobacter nicotianae	bacterium	cheese (Tilsit)	
Arthrobacter variabilis	bacterium	cheese (smear-ripened)	
Aspergillus acidus	fungus	tea	
Aspergillus niger	fungus	liquor awamori	
Aspergillus fumigatus	fungus	chocolate	
Aspergillus oryzae	fungus	soy miso	
Aspergillus oryzae	fungus	liquor sake	
Aspergillus oryzae	fungus	soy sauce	
Aspergillus sojae	fungus	soy miso	
Aspergillus sojae	fungus	soy sauce	
Bacillus cereus	bacterium	chocolate	
Bacillus coagulans	bacterium	chocolate	
Bacillus licheniformis	bacterium	chocolate	
Bacillus pumilus	bacterium	chocolate	
Bacillus sphaericus	bacterium	soy stinky tofu	
Bacillus stearothermophilus	bacterium	chocolate	
Bacillus subtilis	bacterium	chocolate	
Bacillus subtilis	bacterium	soy natto	
Bifidobacterium adolescentis	bacterium	dairy yogurt	
Bifidobacterium animalis	bacterium	dairy	
Bifidobacterium bifidum	bacterium	dairy	
Bifidobacterium breve	bacterium	dairy	
Bifidobacterium breve	bacterium	soy	
Bifidobacterium infantis	bacterium	dairy	
Bifidobacterium lactis	bacterium	dairy	
Bifidobacterium longum	bacterium	dairy	
Bifidobacterium pseudolongum	bacterium	dairy	
Bifidobacterium thermophilum	bacterium	dairy	
Brachybacterium alimentarium	bacterium	cheese (Beaufort)	
Brachybacterium alimentarium	bacterium	cheese (Gruyère)	nol
Brachybacterium tyrofermentans	bacterium	cheese (Beaufort)	
Brachybacterium tyrofermentans	bacterium	cheese (Gruyère)	
Brevibacterium aurantiacum	bacterium	cheese	
Brevibacterium casei	bacterium	cheese (smear-ripened)	
Brevibacterium linens	bacterium	cheese (smear-ripened)	
Candida colliculosa	fungus	cheese	
Candida colliculosa	fungus	dairy kefir	
Candida exiguus	fungus	bread (sourdough)	
Candida humicola	fungus	chocolate	
Candida kefyr	fungus	cheese (surface-ripened)	
Candida krusei	fungus	cheese (surface-ripened)	
Candida milleri	fungus	bread (sourdough)	
Candida mycoderma	fungus	cheese (Limburger)	
Candida pelliculosa	fungus	chocolate	
Candida rugosa	fungus	chocolate	
Candida tropicalis	fungus	chocolate	
Candida utilis	fungus	cheese	
Candida valida	fungus	bread (sourdough)	
Candida vini	fungus	cheese (Reblochon), wine	
Candida zeylanoides	fungus	cheese (Reblochon)	
Carnobacterium divergens	bacterium	cheese	
Carnobacterium divergens	bacterium	fish	
Carnobacterium divergens	bacterium	meat	
Carnobacterium maltaromaticum	bacterium	dairy	
Carnobacterium piscicola	bacterium	meat	
Corynebacterium ammoniagenes	bacterium	cheese	
Corynebacterium casei	bacterium	cheese (smear-ripened)	
Corynebacterium flavescens	bacterium	cheese	
Corynebacterium mooreparkense	bacterium	cheese (smear-ripened)	
Corynebacterium variabile	bacterium	cheese	
Cyberlindnera mrakii	fungus	wine	
Cystofilobasidium infirmominiatum	fungus	cheese	
Debaryomyces hansenii	fungus	cheese (smear-ripened)	
Debaryomyces hansenii	fungus	cheese (Reblochon)	
Debaryomyces kloeckeri	fungus	cheese (Limburger)	
Enterococcus faecalis	bacterium	cheese	
Enterococcus faecalis	bacterium	dairy cream	
Enterococcus faecalis	bacterium	meat ham	
Enterococcus faecalis	bacterium	soy miso	
Enterococcus faecalis	bacterium	vegetable pickle	
Enterococcus faecalis	bacterium	meat sausage	
Enterococcus faecalis	bacterium	soy sauce	
Enterococcus faecium	bacterium	cheese (Manchego)	
Enterococcus faecium	bacterium	meat ham	
Enterococcus faecium	bacterium	soy miso	
Enterococcus faecium	bacterium	vegetable pickle	
Enterococcus faecium	bacterium	soy sauce	
Fusarium domesticum	fungus	cheese	
Geotrichum candidum	fungus	cheese	
Gluconacetobacter azotocaptans	bacterium	chocolate	
Gluconacetobacter azotocaptans	bacterium	coffee	
Gluconacetobacter diazotrophicus	bacterium	chocolate	
Gluconacetobacter diazotrophicus	bacterium	coffee	
Gluconacetobacter entanii	bacterium	vinegar	
Gluconacetobacter europaeus	bacterium	vinegar	
Gluconacetobacter hansenii	bacterium	vinegar	
Gluconacetobacter johannae	bacterium	chocolate	
Gluconacetobacter johannae	bacterium	coffee	
Gluconacetobacter oboediens	bacterium	vinegar	
Gluconacetobacter xylinus	bacterium	vinegar	
Gluconobacter oxydans	bacterium	chocolate	
Hafnia alvei	bacterium	cheese	
Halomonas elongata	bacterium	meat	
Issatchenkia orientalis	fungus	dairy kefir	
Kazachstania exigua	fungus	dairy kefir	
Kazachstania unispora	fungus	dairy kefir	
Kloeckera africana	fungus	chocolate	
Kloeckera apis	fungus	chocolate	.
Kloeckera javanica	fungus	chocolate	
Kluyveromyces lactis	fungus	cheese	
Kluyveromyces marxianus	fungus	cheese	
Kluyveromyces marxianus	fungus	chocolate	
Kocuria rhizophila	bacterium	cheese	
Kocuria rhizophila	bacterium	meat	
Kocuria varians	bacterium	dairy	
Kocuria varians	bacterium	meat sausage	
Komagataeibacter xylinus	bacterium	coconut (nata de coco)	
Lactobacillus acetotolerans	bacterium	fruit	
Lactobacillus acetotolerans	bacterium	bread (sourdough)	
Lactobacillus acetotolerans	bacterium	vegetable pickle	
Lactobacillus acidifarinae	bacterium	bread (sourdough)	
Lactobacillus acidipiscis	bacterium	dairy	
Lactobacillus acidipiscis	bacterium	fish	
Lactobacillus acidophilus	bacterium	vegetables	
Lactobacillus acidophilus	bacterium	dairy yogurt	
Lactobacillus alimentarius	bacterium	fish	
Lactobacillus alimentarius	bacterium	meat	
Lactobacillus brevis	bacterium	cheese (canestrato pugliese)	
Lactobacillus brevis	bacterium	vegetable pickle	
Lactobacillus brevis ssp. linens	bacterium	dairy kefir	
Lactobacillus bucheri	bacterium	bread	
Lactobacillus bucheri	bacterium	wine	
Lactobacillus cacaonum	bacterium	chocolate	
Lactobacillus casei	bacterium	cheese (Idiazabal)	
Lactobacillus casei	bacterium	cheese (Manchego)	
Lactobacillus casei	bacterium	cheese (Roncal)	
Lactobacillus casei	bacterium	dairy yogurt	
Lactobacillus casei ssp. pseudoplantarum	bacterium	cheese (Grana Padano)	
Lactobacillus casei ssp. pseudoplantarum	bacterium	cheese (Parmigiano-Reggiano)	
Lactobacillus cellobiosus	bacterium	chocolate	
Lactobacillus collinoides	bacterium	cider	
Lactobacillus composti	bacterium	liquor shōchū	
Lactobacillus coryniformis	bacterium	cheese	
Lactobacillus crispatus	bacterium	bread (sourdough)	
Lactobacillus curvatus	bacterium	cheese (cacio di Fossa)	
Lactobacillus curvatus	bacterium	cheese (canestrato pugliese)	
Lactobacillus curvatus	bacterium	cheese (pecorino romano)	
Lactobacillus curvatus	bacterium	cheese (pecorino sardo)	
Lactobacillus curvatus	bacterium	meat sausage	
Lactobacillus delbrueckii	bacterium	vegetables	
Lactobacillus delbrueckii ssp. bulgaricus	bacterium	cheese	
Lactobacillus delbrueckii ssp. bulgaricus	bacterium	dairy yogurt	
Lactobacillus delbrueckii ssp. lactis	bacterium	cheese (pecorino romano)	
Lactobacillus dextrinicus	bacterium	meat	
Lactobacillus diolivorans	bacterium	liquor chicha	
Lactobacillus fabifermentans	bacterium	chocolate	
Lactobacillus farciminis	bacterium	fish	
Lactobacillus farciminis	bacterium	soy	
Lactobacillus fermentum	bacterium	chocolate	
Lactobacillus fermentum	bacterium	cheese (pecorino romano)	
Lactobacillus fermentum	bacterium	bread (sourdough)	
Lactobacillus gasseri	bacterium	dairy	
Lactobacillus gasseri	bacterium	bread (sourdough)	
Lactobacillus ghanensis	bacterium	chocolate	
Lactobacillus hammesii	bacterium	bread (sourdough)	
Lactobacillus harbinensis	bacterium	vegetables	
Lactobacillus helveticus	bacterium	cheese (Emmental)	
Lactobacillus helveticus	bacterium	vegetables	
Lactobacillus hilgardii	bacterium	chocolate	
Lactobacillus hilgardii	bacterium	wine	
Lactobacillus homohiochii	bacterium	liquor sake	
Lactobacillus homohiochii	bacterium	bread (sourdough)	
Lactobacillus jensenii	bacterium	bread	
Lactobacillus johnsonii	bacterium	dairy	
Lactobacillus johnsonii	bacterium	bread (sourdough)	
Lactobacillus kefiranofaciens	bacterium	dairy kefir	
Lactobacillus kefiri	bacterium	dairy kefir	
Lactobacillus kimchii	bacterium	vegetable kimchi	
Lactobacillus kisonensis	bacterium	vegetable pickle	
Lactobacillus kunkeei	bacterium	wine	
Lactobacillus mali	bacterium	cider	
Lactobacillus mali	bacterium	rum	
Lactobacillus mali	bacterium	wine	
Lactobacillus manihotivorans	bacterium	liquor cassava	
Lactobacillus mindensis	bacterium	bread (sourdough)	
Lactobacillus mucosae	bacterium	bread (sourdough)	
Lactobacillus nagelii	bacterium	wine	
Lactobacillus namuresis	bacterium	bread (sourdough)	
Lactobacillus nantesis	bacterium	bread (sourdough)	
Lactobacillus nodensis	bacterium	dairy	
Lactobacillus oeni	bacterium	wine	
Lactobacillus otakiensis	bacterium	vegetable pickle	
Lactobacillus panis	bacterium	bread (sourdough)	
Lactobacillus parabrevis	bacterium	cheese	
Lactobacillus parabrevis	bacterium	dairy kefir	
Lactobacillus parabrevis	bacterium	vegetables	
Lactobacillus parabuchneri	bacterium	bread (sourdough)	
Lactobacillus paracasei	bacterium	dairy	
Lactobacillus paracasei	bacterium	meat	
Lactobacillus paracasei ssp. paracasei	bacterium	cheese (cacio di Fossa)	
Lactobacillus paracasei ssp. paracasei	bacterium	cheese (canestrato pugliese)	
Lactobacillus paracasei ssp. paracasei	bacterium	cheese (pecorino sardo)	
Lactobacillus parakefiri	bacterium	dairy kefir	
Lactobacillus paralimentarius	bacterium	bread (sourdough)	
Lactobacillus paraplantarum	bacterium	cheese	
Lactobacillus paraplantarum	bacterium	vegetables	
Lactobacillus pentosus	bacterium	cheese (canestrato pugliese)	
Lactobacillus pentosus	bacterium	fish	
Lactobacillus pentosus	bacterium	fruit	
Lactobacillus pentosus	bacterium	wine	
Lactobacillus perolens	bacterium	cheese	
Lactobacillus perolens	bacterium	vegetables	
Lactobacillus plantarum	bacterium	cheese (cacio di Fossa)	
Lactobacillus plantarum	bacterium	cheese (canestrato pugliese)	
Lactobacillus plantarum	bacterium	chocolate	
Lactobacillus plantarum	bacterium	cheese (Idiazabal)	
Lactobacillus plantarum	bacterium	cheese (Manchego)	
Lactobacillus plantarum	bacterium	cheese (pecorino romano)	
Lactobacillus plantarum	bacterium	cheese (Roncal)	
Lactobacillus plantarum	bacterium	meat sausage	
Lactobacillus plantarum	bacterium	vegetables	
Lactobacillus pobuzihii	bacterium	fruit	
Lactobacillus pontis	bacterium	bread (sourdough)	
Lactobacillus rapi	bacterium	vegetable pickle	
Lactobacillus rapi	bacterium	vegetables	
Lactobacillus reuteri	bacterium	bread (sourdough)	
Lactobacillus rhamnosus	bacterium	cheese (Grana Padano)	
Lactobacillus rhamnosus	bacterium	cheese (Parmigiano-Reggiano)	
Lactobacillus rhamnosus	bacterium	meat	
Lactobacillus rhamnosus	bacterium	vegetables	
Lactobacillus rossiae	bacterium	bread (sourdough)	
Lactobacillus sakei	bacterium	liquor sake	
Lactobacillus sakei	bacterium	meat sausage	
Lactobacillus salivarius	bacterium	dairy	
Lactobacillus sanfranciscensis	bacterium	bread (sourdough)	
Lactobacillus satsumensis	bacterium	liquor shōchū	
Lactobacillus secaliphilus	bacterium	bread (sourdough)	
Lactobacillus senmaizukei	bacterium	vegetable pickle	
Lactobacillus siliginis	bacterium	bread (sourdough)	
Lactobacillus similis	bacterium	liquor rum	
Lactobacillus spicheri	bacterium	bread (sourdough)	
Lactobacillus suebicus	bacterium	fruit	
Lactobacillus spp.	bacterium	dairy butter	
Lactobacillus spp.	bacterium	vegetable olive	
Lactobacillus sunkii	bacterium	vegetable pickle	
Lactobacillus tucceti	bacterium	dairy	
Lactobacillus tucceti	bacterium	meat sausage	
Lactobacillus vaccinostercus	bacterium	fruit	
Lactobacillus vaccinostercus	bacterium	vegetables	
Lactobacillus versmoldesis	bacterium	meat sausage	
Lactobacillus yamanashiensis	bacterium	cider	
Lactobacillus yamanashiensis	bacterium	wine	
Lactococcus lactis	bacterium	dairy buttermilk	
Lactococcus lactis	bacterium	chocolate	
Lactococcus lactis ssp. cremoris	bacterium	cheese (Cheddar)	
Lactococcus lactis ssp. lactis	bacterium	cheese	
Lactococcus raffinolactis	bacterium	cheese	
Lactococcus spp.	bacterium	dairy butter	
Lecanicillium lecanii	fungus	cheese	
Leuconostoc carnosum	bacterium	meat	
Leuconostoc citreum	bacterium	cheese	
Leuconostoc citreum	bacterium	fish	
Leuconostoc fallax	bacterium	vegetable sauerkraut	
Leuconostoc holzapfelii	bacterium	coffee	
Leuconostoc inhae	bacterium	vegetable kimchi	
Leuconostoc kimchii	bacterium	vegetable kimchi	
Leuconostoc lactis	bacterium	cheese	
Leuconostoc mesenteroides	bacterium	chocolate	
Leuconostoc mesenteroides	bacterium	vegetables	
Leuconostoc mesenteroides ssp. cremoris	bacterium	cheese	
Leuconostoc mesenteroides ssp. cremoris	bacterium	vegetables	
Leuconostoc mesenteroides ssp. dextranicum	bacterium	dairy butter	
Leuconostoc mesenteroides ssp. dextranicum	bacterium	cheese (Idiazabal)	
Leuconostoc mesenteroides ssp. dextranicum	bacterium	vegetable pickle	
Leuconostoc mesenteroides ssp. dextranicum	bacterium	cheese (Roncal)	
Leuconostoc mesenteroides ssp. mesenteroides	bacterium	cheese (Idiazabal)	
Leuconostoc mesenteroides ssp. mesenteroides	bacterium	cheese (Roncal)	
Leuconostoc palmae	bacterium	liquor palm wine	
Leuconostoc pseudomesenteroides	bacterium	dairy butter	
Leuconostoc pseudomesenteroides	bacterium	dairy buttermilk	
Leuconostoc pseudomesenteroides	bacterium	dairy sour cream	
Leuconostoc spp.	bacterium	dairy butter	
Leuconostoc spp.	bacterium	vegetable olive	
Leuconostoc spp.	bacterium	wine	
Macrococcus caseolyticus	bacterium	cheese	
Macrococcus caseolyticus	bacterium	meat sausage	
Microbacterium foliorum	bacterium	cheese (surface-ripened)	
Microbacterium gubbeenense	bacterium	cheese (Limburger)	
Microbacterium gubbeenense	bacterium	cheese (smear-ripened)	
Microbacterium gubbeenense	bacterium	cheese (Tilsit)	
Micrococcus luteus	bacterium	cheese	
Micrococcus lylae	bacterium	meat sausage	
Mucor hiemalis	fungus	soy bean curd	
Mucor plumbeus	fungus	cheese	
Mucor racemosus	fungus	cheese	
Mucor racemosus	fungus	chocolate	
Neurospora intermedia	fungus	soy oncom	
Oenococcus oeni	bacterium	wine	
Pediococcus acidilactici	bacterium	meat sausage	
Pediococcus acidilactici	bacterium	vegetables	
Pediococcus pentosaceus	bacterium	meat sausage	
Penicillium album	fungus	cheese (farmhouse)	
Penicillium camemberti	fungus	cheese	v
Penicillium caseifulvum	fungus	cheese	
Penicillium chrysogenum	fungus	cheese	
Penicillium chrysogenum	fungus	meat sausage	
Penicillium commune	fungus	cheese (surface-ripened)	
Penicillium nalgiovense	fungus	cheese	
Penicillium nalgiovense	fungus	meat ham	
Penicillium nalgiovense	fungus	meat sausage	
Penicillium roqueforti	fungus	cheese	
Penicillium solitum	fungus	meat	
Pichia fermentans	fungus	dairy	
Pichia fermentans	fungus	dairy kefir	
Pichia fermentans	fungus	wine	
Propionibacterium acidipropionici	bacterium	cheese	
Propionibacterium freudenreichii ssp. freudenreichii	bacterium	dairy	
Propionibacterium freudenreichii ssp. shermanii	bacterium	cheese (Emmental)	
Propionibacterium jensenii	bacterium	cheese	
Propionibacterium thoenii	bacterium	cheese	
Proteus vulgaris	bacterium	cheese (surface-ripened)	
Pseudomonas fluorescens	bacterium	dairy yogurt	
Psychrobacter celer	bacterium	cheese	
Rhizopus microsporus ssp. oligosporus	fungus	soy oncom	
Rhizopus microsporus ssp. oligosporus	fungus	soy tempeh	
Rhodosporidium infirmominiatum	fungus	cheese	
Rhodotorula glutinis	fungus	chocolate	
Rhodotorula minuta	fungus	cheese (smear-ripened)	
Rhodotorula rubra	fungus	chocolate	
Saccharomyces bayanus	fungus	beer	
Saccharomyces bayanus	fungus	cider	
Saccharomyces bayanus	fungus	wine	
Saccharomyces carlsbergensis	fungus	beer (lager)	
Saccharomyces cerevisiae	fungus	beer (ale)	
Saccharomyces cerevisiae	fungus	bread	
Saccharomyces cerevisiae	fungus	cider	
Saccharomyces cerevisiae	fungus	cheese	
Saccharomyces cerevisiae	fungus	chocolate	
Saccharomyces cerevisiae	fungus	wine	
Saccharomyces pastorianus	fungus	beer (lager)	
Saccharomyces rouzii	fungus	soy miso	
Saccharomyces uvarum	fungus	beer (lager)	
Staphylococcus carnosus	bacterium	cheese	
Staphylococcus carnosus ssp. carnosus	bacterium	meat sausage	
Staphylococcus condimenti	bacterium	soy	
Staphylococcus equorum	bacterium	meat	
Staphylococcus equorum ssp. linens	bacterium	cheese	
Staphylococcus fleurettii	bacterium	cheese	
Staphylococcus piscifermentans	bacterium	fish	
Staphylococcus saphrophyticus	bacterium	cheese (Harzer)	
Staphylococcus sciuri ssp. carnaticus	bacterium	cheese	
Staphylococcus simulans	bacterium	meat sausage	
Staphylococcus succinus	bacterium	dairy	
Staphylococcus succinus	bacterium	meat	
Staphylococcus vitulinus	bacterium	cheese	
Staphylococcus vitulinus	bacterium	meat	
Staphylococcus warneri	bacterium	meat	
Staphylococcus xylosus	bacterium	cheese	
Staphylococcus xylosus	bacterium	meat sausage	
Streptococcus gallolyticus	bacterium	dairy	
Streptococcus salivarius	bacterium	dairy yogurt	
Streptococcus thermophilus	bacterium	cheese	
Streptococcus thermophilus	bacterium	dairy yogurt	
Streptomyces griseus	bacterium	meat	
Streptomyces mobaraensis	bacterium	meat, fish	
Tetragenococcus halophilus	bacterium	soy miso	
Tetragenococcus halophilus	bacterium	soy sauce	
Tetragenococcus koreensis	bacterium	vegetable kimchi	
Torulaspora delbrueckii	fungus	cheese (smear-ripened)	
Torulopsis versatilis	fungus	soy miso	
Thrichosporon beigelii	fungus	cheese (smear-ripened)	
Verticillium lecanii	fungus	cheese (Tomme)	
Weissella beninensis	bacterium	liquor cassava	
Weissella cibaria	bacterium	vegetable kimchi	
Weissella fabaria	bacterium	chocolate	
Weissella ghanesis	bacterium	chocolate	
Weissella koreensis	bacterium	vegetable kimchi	
Weissella paramesenteroides	bacterium	meat sausage	
Weissella thailandensis	bacterium	fish	
Yarrowia lipolytica	fungus	cheese (Raclette)	
Yarrowia lipolytica	not applicable	cheese (smear-ripened)	
Yarrowia lipolytica	fungus	dairy	
Zygotorulaspora florentina	fungus	dairy kefir	
Zymomonas mobilis	bacterium	liquor palm wine	
Zymomonas mobilis	bacterium	liquor pulque	

== See also ==
- Fermentation (food)
- Food microbiology
