= Brachybacterium paraconglomeratum =

Scientific classification
- Domain: Bacteria
- Kingdom: Bacillati
- Phylum: Actinomycetota
- Class: Actinomycetia
- Order: Micrococcales
- Family: Dermabacteraceae
- Genus: Brachybacterium
- Species: B. paraconglomeratum

Binomial name
- Brachybacterium paraconglomeratum Takeuchi et al. 1995

Species of bacterium

Brachybacterium paraconglomeratum is a species of Gram positive, facultatively anaerobic, pale brown pigmented bacterium. The cells are coccoid during the stationary phase, and irregular rods during the exponential phase. The species was identified when a strain of Brachybacterium faecium was found to be a different species of Brachybacterium. The name is derived from Latin para (alongside of, resembling) and conglomeratum (rolled together). B. paraconglomeratum resembles Brachybacterium conglomeratum phenotypically, and but are separate species based on DNA–DNA hybridization. B. paraconglomeratum and B. conglomeratum were first proposed as species in the same paper in 1995, along with B. rhamnosum.
