= Brachybacterium phenoliresistens =

Scientific classification
- Domain: Bacteria
- Kingdom: Bacillati
- Phylum: Actinomycetota
- Class: Actinomycetia
- Order: Micrococcales
- Family: Dermabacteraceae
- Genus: Brachybacterium
- Species: B. phenoliresistens

Binomial name
- Brachybacterium phenoliresistens Chou et al. 2007

Species of bacterium

Brachybacterium phenoliresistens is a species of Gram positive, facultatively anaerobic, yellow-pigmented bacterium. The cells are coccoid during the stationary phase, and irregular rods during the exponential phase. It was first isolated from oil-contaminated sand in Pingtung County, Taiwan. The species was first described in 2007, and its name refers to the species' ability to resist phenol. It is most closely related to B. nesterenkovii.

The optimum growth temperature for B. phenoliresistens is 28 to 35 °C (82 to 95 °F), but can grow at 4 to 40 °C (39 to 104 °F). The optimum pH is 7.0, and it can grow at pH 5.0-10.0.
