= Brachybacterium sacelli =

Scientific classification
- Domain: Bacteria
- Kingdom: Bacillati
- Phylum: Actinomycetota
- Class: Actinomycetia
- Order: Micrococcales
- Family: Dermabacteraceae
- Genus: Brachybacterium
- Species: B. sacelli

Binomial name
- Brachybacterium sacelli Heyrman et al. 2002

Species of bacterium

Brachybacterium sacelli is a species of Gram positive, strictly aerobic, cream-pigmented bacterium. The cells are coccoid during the stationary phase, and irregular rods during the exponential phase. It was first isolated from a medieval wall painting of the chapel of Schloss Herberstein in Styria, Austria. The species was proposed in 2014, and the name is derived from Latin sacelli (of the chapel). Another novel species B. fresconis was isolated from the same painting.

The optimum growth temperature for B. sacelli is 20-30 °C, but can grow in the 5-40 °C range.
