= Brachybacterium rhamnosum =

Scientific classification
- Domain: Bacteria
- Kingdom: Bacillati
- Phylum: Actinomycetota
- Class: Actinomycetia
- Order: Micrococcales
- Family: Dermabacteraceae
- Genus: Brachybacterium
- Species: B. rhamnosum

Binomial name
- Brachybacterium rhamnosum Takeuchi et al. 1995

Species of bacterium

Brachybacterium rhamnosum is a species of Gram positive, facultatively anaerobic, whitish yellow-pigmented bacterium. The cells are coccoid during the stationary phase, and irregular rods during the exponential phase. It was first isolated from corn steep liquor, and the species was proposed in 1995 along with Brachybacterium conglomeratum and B. paraconglomeratum. The name is derived from the fact that there is an abundance of the sugar rhamnose in the cell wall.
