= Brachybacterium huguangmaarense =

Scientific classification
- Domain: Bacteria
- Kingdom: Bacillati
- Phylum: Actinomycetota
- Class: Actinomycetia
- Order: Micrococcales
- Family: Dermabacteraceae
- Genus: Brachybacterium
- Species: B. huguangmaarense

Binomial name
- Brachybacterium huguangmaarense Liu et al. 2014

Species of bacterium

Brachybacterium huguangmaarense is a species of Gram positive, strictly aerobic, orange-pigmented bacterium. The cells are coccoid during the stationary phase, and irregular rods during the exponential phase. It was first isolated from a lake sediment sample from Huguangyan Maar Lake collected in Zhanjiang, Guangdong Province, China. The species was first described in 2014, and the name is derived from the location from which the organism was first isolated.

The optimum growth temperature for B. huguangmaarense is 28–30 °C, but can grow in the 18–40 °C range. The optimum pH is 7.0–8.0, and can grow in pH 4.0–8.0.
