= B. horti =

B. horti may refer to:

- Bacillus horti, a Gram-positive bacterium
- Brachybacterium horti, a Gram-positive bacterium
