= Brachybacterium tyrofermentans =

Scientific classification
- Domain: Bacteria
- Kingdom: Bacillati
- Phylum: Actinomycetota
- Class: Actinomycetia
- Order: Micrococcales
- Family: Dermabacteraceae
- Genus: Brachybacterium
- Species: B. tyrofermentans

Binomial name
- Brachybacterium tyrofermentans Schubert et al. 1996

Species of bacterium

Brachybacterium tyrofermentans is a species of Gram positive, facultatively anaerobic, pale yellow-pigmented bacterium. The cells are coccoid during the stationary phase, and irregular rods during the exponential phase. It was first isolated from the surfaces of Beaufort and Gruyère cheeses in 1978, along with Brachybacterium alimentarium. Further work led to the proposal of the new species in 1996, and the name is derived from the Latin tyros (cheese) and fermentans (leavening), referring to the fermented cheese from which it was first isolated.

The optimum growth temperature for B. tyrofermentans is 30 °C, but can grow in the 20-37 °C range. The optimum pH is 7.3.
