= Weissella fabalis =

Scientific classification
- Domain: Bacteria
- Kingdom: Bacillati
- Phylum: Bacillota
- Class: Bacilli
- Order: Lactobacillales
- Family: Lactobacillaceae
- Genus: Weissella
- Species: W. fabalis

Binomial name
- Weissella fabalis Snauwaert et al. 2013

Type strain
- CCUG 61472, LMG 26217, M75

Species of bacterium

Weissella fabalis is a facultatively anaerobic and non-motile bacterium from the genus of Weissella which has been isolated from fermented cocoa beans from Brazil.
