= B. ginsengisoli =

B. ginsengisoli may refer to:

- Bacillus ginsengisoli, a Gram-positive bacterium.
- Brachybacterium ginsengisoli, a Gram-positive bacterium.
- Brevibacillus ginsengisoli, a Gram-positive bacterium.
