= Lactiplantibacillus plantarum PS128 =

Scientific classification
- Domain: Bacteria
- Kingdom: Bacillati
- Phylum: Bacillota
- Class: Bacilli
- Order: Lactobacillales
- Family: Lactobacillaceae
- Genus: Lactiplantibacillus
- Species: L. plantarum
- Strain: L. p. PS128

Trionomial name
- Lactiplantibacillus plantarum PS128

Strain of bacteria

Lactiplantibacillus plantarum PS128 is a specific strain of Lactiplantibacillus plantarum, a bacterium of the genus Lactobacillus .

Lactiplantibacillus plantarum is a diverse species of lactic bacterium found in a wide range of ecological niches including plant substrates, meat, milk, as well as in the gastrointestinal tract of humans. Lactic bacteria are gram-positive, oxygen-tolerant anaerobes that have been used in food fermentation for hundreds of years.

== Safety ==
Lactiplantibacillus plantarum is "generally recognized as safe". and included in the "qualified presumption of safety" list of the European Food Safety Authority.

A study on Rett syndrome patients found that probiotic Lactiplantibacillus plantarum PS128 supplementation was safe, well-tolerated, and showed promising improvements in cognitive development and dystonia, suggesting potential as a complementary therapy for Rett syndrome.
