= Brachybacterium squillarum =

Scientific classification
- Domain: Bacteria
- Kingdom: Bacillati
- Phylum: Actinomycetota
- Class: Actinomycetia
- Order: Micrococcales
- Family: Dermabacteraceae
- Genus: Brachybacterium
- Species: B. squillarum

Binomial name
- Brachybacterium squillarum Park et al. 2011

Species of bacterium

Brachybacterium squillarum is a species of Gram positive, strictly aerobic, halotolerant, yellow-pigmented bacterium. The cells are coccoid during the stationary phase, and irregular rods during the exponential phase. It was first isolated from salt-fermented seafood (tiny shrimp) from South Korea. The species was first proposed in 2011, and the name is derived from Latin squillarum (of/from shrimp).

The optimum growth temperature for B. squillarum is 30 °C, but can grow in the 25-37 °C range. The pH optimum is 7.0, and can grow in the 6.0-9.0 range. The cells are halotolerant, and can grow in NaCl salt concentrations up to 10%, and optimally grows in concentrations of 5%.
