= Brachybacterium =

Scientific classification
- Domain: Bacteria
- Kingdom: Bacillati
- Phylum: Actinomycetota
- Class: Actinomycetia
- Order: Micrococcales
- Family: Dermabacteraceae
- Genus: Brachybacterium; Collins et al. 1988

Type species
- Brachybacterium faecium Collins et al. 1988

Species
- See text.

Genus of bacteria

Brachybacterium is a genus of Gram positive, nonmotile bacteria. The cells are coccoid during the stationary phase, and irregular rods during the exponential phase. The genus name comes from Greek word brachy, meaning short, and Latin bacterium, meaning rods, referencing the short rods noted during the exponential phase.

The type species of the genus, Brachybacterium faecium, was first isolated from poultry deep litter in 1966 along with several other species. Speciation of the strains was performed in 1975, but three of the strains did not cluster with any known taxon. In 1988, further work was performed on the previously unclassified organisms, and the current genus was proposed. Brachybacteria have been isolated from a stool sample of a healthy three-year-old girl, garden soil, Beaufort cheese, medieval wall paintings, a mouse liver, roots, salt fermented seafood, oil-contaminated coastal sand, sediment samples, and seawater. A strain of Brachybacterium has been indicated as the cause of bloodborne infection in an 83 year-old man.

== Species ==
Brachybacterium comprises the following species:

- B. alimentarium Schubert et al. 1996
- B. aquaticum Kaur et al. 2016
- B. avium Tak et al. 2018
- B. conglomeratum (ex Migula 1900) Takeuchi et al. 1995
- B. endophyticum Tuo et al. 2018
- B. faecium Collins et al. 1988
- B. fresconis Heyrman et al. 2002
- B. ginsengisoli Hoang et al. 2014
- B. hainanense Liu et al. 2015
- B. halotolerans Chen et al. 2021
- B. horti Singh et al. 2016
- B. huguangmaarense Liu et al. 2014
- "B. massiliense" Tidjani-Alou et al. 2017
- B. muris Buczolits et al. 2003
- B. nesterenkovii Gvozdyak et al. 1992
- B. paraconglomeratum Takeuchi et al. 1995
- B. phenoliresistens Chou et al. 2007
- B. rhamnosum Takeuchi et al. 1995
- B. sacelli Heyrman et al. 2002
- B. saurashtrense Gontia et al. 2011
- B. squillarum Park et al. 2011
- B. subflavum Ming et al. 2021
- "B. timonense" Kuete et al. 2019
- B. tyrofermentans Schubert et al. 1996
- B. vulturis Tak et al. 2018
- B. zhongshanense Zhang et al. 2007
