= Acetobacter =

Scientific classification
- Domain: Bacteria
- Kingdom: Pseudomonadati
- Phylum: Pseudomonadota
- Class: Alphaproteobacteria
- Order: Rhodospirillales
- Family: Acetobacteraceae
- Genus: Acetobacter; Beijerinck 1898

Type species
- Acetobacter aceti

Species
- A. aceti A. cerevisiae A. cibinongensis A. estunensis A. fabarum A. farinalis A. indonesiensis A. lambici A. liquefaciens A. lovaniensis A. malorum A. musti A. nitrogenifigens A. oeni A. okinawensis A. orientalis A. orleanensis A. papayae A. pasteurianus A. peroxydans A. persici A. pomorum A. senegalensis A. sicerae A. suratthaniensis A. syzygii A. thailandicus A. tropicalis A. xylinus

Genus of bacteria

Acetobacter is a genus of acetic acid bacteria. Acetic acid bacteria are characterized by the ability to convert ethanol to acetic acid in the presence of oxygen. Of these, the genus Acetobacter is distinguished by the ability to oxidize lactate and acetate into carbon dioxide and water. Bacteria of the genus Acetobacter have been isolated from industrial vinegar fermentation processes and are frequently used as fermentation starter cultures.

== History of research ==
The acetic fermentation was demonstrated by Louis Pasteur, who discovered the first acetobacter - Acetobacter aceti - in 1864.

In 1998, two strains of Acetobacter isolated from red wine and cider vinegar were named Acetobacter oboediens and Acetobacter pomorum.

In 2000, Acetobacter oboediens and Acetobacter intermedius were transferred to Gluconacetobacter on the basis of 16S rRNA sequencing.

In 2002, Acetobacter cerevisiae and Acetobacter malorum were identified by 16S rRNA sequence analysis of Acetobacter strains.

In 2006, a strain of Acetobacter isolated from spoiled red wine was named Acetobacter oeni.

== Microbiota ==
The genus Acetobacter contains species which are important commensal bacteria in the gut microbiome of Drosophila melanogaster. The species A. pomorum specifically helps uphold the physiology and development of D. melanogaster through insulin/insulin-like growth factor signaling.
