= Gluconacetobacter diazotrophicus =

Scientific classification
- Domain: Bacteria
- Kingdom: Pseudomonadati
- Phylum: Pseudomonadota
- Class: Alphaproteobacteria
- Order: Rhodospirillales
- Family: Acetobacteraceae
- Genus: Gluconacetobacter
- Species: G. diazotrophicus

Binomial name
- Gluconacetobacter diazotrophicus (Gillis et al. 1989) Yamada et al. 1998

Species of bacterium

Gluconacetobacter diazotrophicus is a bacterium with a rod-like shape, has rounded ends and belongs to Gram-negative bacteria. The bacterium is known for stimulating plant growth and being tolerant to acetic acid. With one to three lateral flagella, and known to be found on sugarcane, Gluconacetobacter diazotrophicus was discovered in Brazil by Vladimir A. Cavalcante and Johanna Dobereiner.

== Characteristics ==
Originally found in Alagoas, Brazil, Gluconacetobacter diazotrophicus is a bacterium that has several interesting features and aspects which are important to note. The bacterium was first discovered by Vladimir A. Cavalcante and Johanna Dobereiner while analyzing sugarcane in Brazil. Gluconacetobacter diazotrophicus is a part of the Acetobacteraceae family and started out with the name, Saccharibacter nitrocaptans, however, the bacterium is renamed as Acetobacter diazotrophicus because the bacterium is found to belong with bacteria that are able to tolerate acetic acid. Again, the bacterium’s name was changed to Gluconacetobacter diazotrophicus when its taxonomic position was resolved using 16s ribosomal RNA analysis. In addition to being a part of the Acetobacter family, Gluconacetobacter diazotrophicus belongs to the Pseudomonadota phylum, the Alphaproteobacteria class, and the Gluconacetobacter genus while being a part of the Rhodosprillales order. Other nitrogen-fixing species in this same genus include Gluconacetobacter azotocaptans and Gluconacetobacter johannae Muthukumarasamy et al., reported that this bacterium was found to be associated with sugarcane and paddy and mitigating 50 % of N requirement in sugarcane and paddy. Gluconacetobacter diazotrophicus cells are shaped like rods, have ends that are circular or round, and have anyom one to three flagella that are lateral. Based on these descriptions of the cell, Gluconacetobacter diazotrophicus was first classified as a proposed new genus and species named Saccharobacter nitrocaptans.. The cells be viewed as darkish brown or orange colonies under a microscope. In addition, the cells are aerobic which describes their need of oxygen. Because the bacterium is found on sugar cane when first discovered, as explained prior, and reacts strongly to high amounts of sugar, Gram Negative is the correct classification for Gluconacetobacter diazotrophicus. In addition to sugarcane, G. diazotrophicus has been found in different plants like coffee tree and pineapple. Gluconacetobacter diazotrophicus is also known for nitrogen fixation. This feature allows the bacteria to work on nitrogen in the air in order for the correct amount of nitrogen can be received by plants. Gluconacetobacter diazotrophicus is a notable microbe because studies have shown that the bacteria can help tomatoes and other crops grow. Besides to be a nitrogen-fixing bacterium, G. diazotrophicus synthesizes Indole-3-acid acetic, that could contribute to promote the growth of the associated plant. This microbe fights off Xanthomonas albilineans which is a pathogen found in sugar cane. In regard to the ecology of this microorganisms, the numbers of G. diazotrophicus that colonize sugarcane decrease when the plant is grown under high nitrogen fertilization doses. Overall, Gluconacetobacter diazotrophicus, through the research restated, plays a significant role in the environment for plants specifically sugar cane, helps to grow crops, and can be found in areas that are acidic and contain oxygen.

== Genome ==
The genome that was found to be closely sequenced with Gluconacetobacter diazotrophicus was the Pal5 genome. This genome has one circular chromosome and two plasmids. The two plasmids found in the genome are pGD01 and pGD02 which contain 38,818 and 16,610 base pairs respectively. The G-C content for Gluconacetobacter diazotrophicus could be calculated at 66.19%. The Pal5 genome was found to have 583 proteins that can be used to depict the possible “metabolic pathways” in Gluconacetobacter diazotrophicus. The bacterium has been studied to move from different crops and also helpful in growing corn. Because they create phytohormones, Gluconacetobacter diazotrophicus has proven to stimulate other plant’s growth.
