= Brachybacterium zhongshanense =

Scientific classification
- Domain: Bacteria
- Kingdom: Bacillati
- Phylum: Actinomycetota
- Class: Actinomycetia
- Order: Micrococcales
- Family: Dermabacteraceae
- Genus: Brachybacterium
- Species: B. zhongshanense

Binomial name
- Brachybacterium zhongshanense Zhang et al. 2007

Species of bacterium

Brachybacterium zhongshanense is a species of Gram positive, facultatively anaerobic, halotolerant, cream-pigmented bacterium. The cells are coccoid during the stationary phase, and irregular rods during the exponential phase. It was first isolated from sediment along the Qijiang River, Zhongshan, China. The species was first proposed in 2011, and the name refers to the city from which it was first isolated.

The optimum growth temperature for B. zhongshanense is 25-40 °C, but can grow in the 25-37 °C range. The pH optimum is 5.0-8.0, and can grow in the 5.0-11.0 range. The cells are halotolerant, and can grow in NaCl salt concentrations up to 10%.
