= Brachybacterium saurashtrense =

Scientific classification
- Domain: Bacteria
- Kingdom: Bacillati
- Phylum: Actinomycetota
- Class: Actinomycetia
- Order: Micrococcales
- Family: Dermabacteraceae
- Genus: Brachybacterium
- Species: B. saurashtrense

Binomial name
- Brachybacterium saurashtrense Gontia et al. 2011

Species of bacterium

Brachybacterium saurashtrense is a species of Gram positive, strictly aerobic, halotolerant, pale yellow-pigmented bacterium. The cells are coccoid during the stationary phase, and irregular rods during the exponential phase. It was first isolated from roots of Salicornia brachiate plants collected from coastal marshy swamps, in Bhavnagar, Gujarat, India. The species was first proposed in 2011, and the name is derived from Saurashtra, the region where it was first isolated.

The optimum growth temperature for B. saurashtrense is 30 °C, but can grow in the 10-45 °C range. The pH optimum is 8.0, and can grow in the 6.0-11.0 range. The cells are halotolerant, and can survive in NaCl salt concentrations up to 15%, and can grow in concentrations of 8%.
