= Weissella ghanensis =

Scientific classification
- Domain: Bacteria
- Kingdom: Bacillati
- Phylum: Bacillota
- Class: Bacilli
- Order: Lactobacillales
- Family: Lactobacillaceae
- Genus: Weissella
- Species: W. ghanensis

Binomial name
- Weissella ghanensis De Bruyne et al. 2008

Type strain
- De Bruyne R-30243, De Vuyst 215, DSM 19935, LMG 24286

Species of bacterium

Weissella ghanensis is a bacterium from the genus of Weissella which has been isolated from fermented cocoa beans in Ghana.
