= Brachybacterium faecium =

Scientific classification
- Domain: Bacteria
- Kingdom: Bacillati
- Phylum: Actinomycetota
- Class: Actinomycetes
- Order: Micrococcales
- Family: Dermabacteraceae
- Genus: Brachybacterium
- Species: B. faecium

Binomial name
- Brachybacterium faecium Collins et al. 1988

Species of bacterium

Brachybacterium faecium is a species of Gram positive, facultatively anaerobic bacterium. Colony pigmentation is grey, white, or pale yellow. The cells are coccoid during the stationary phase, and irregular rods during the exponential phase. It was first isolated from poultry deep litter in 1966. The species was the first proposed for genus Brachybacterium in 1988, and is the type strain for the genus. The name is derived from the Latin faecium (dregs of feces), referring to the poultry litter from which it was first isolated.

The optimum growth temperature for B. faecium is 25-30 °C.
