= B. muris =

B. muris may refer to:

- Brachybacterium muris, a Gram-positive bacterium.
- Mycoplasma haemomuris, (formerly Bartonella muris) a Gram-negative bacterium.
