= Brachybacterium massiliense =

Scientific classification
- Domain: Bacteria
- Kingdom: Bacillati
- Phylum: Actinomycetota
- Class: Actinomycetes
- Order: Micrococcales
- Family: Dermabacteraceae
- Genus: Brachybacterium
- Species: B. massiliense

Binomial name
- Brachybacterium massiliense Tidjani-Alou et al. 2017

Synonyms
- "Brachybacterium massiliense" Mekhalif et al. 2019

Species of bacterium

"Brachybacterium massiliense" is a species of Gram positive bacterium. It was first isolated from a stool sample of 38-month-old healthy girl from Senegal. The species was first proposed in 2017, and the name is derived from Massilia, the Roman name for Marseille, the location of the laboratory where B. massiliense was first isolated.
