= Malorum =

Malorum may refer to:

- Acetobacter malorum, species of bacteria
- Ingruentium malorum, encyclical of Pope Pius XII on reciting the rosary
- Finis Malorum, album
- De finibus bonorum et malorum, Socratic dialogue
