= B. aquaticum =

B. aquaticum may refer to:

- Brachybacterium aquaticum, a Gram-positive bacterium
- Bupthalmum aquaticum, a flowering plant
