= Brachybacterium endophyticum =

Scientific classification
- Domain: Bacteria
- Kingdom: Bacillati
- Phylum: Actinomycetota
- Class: Actinomycetia
- Order: Micrococcales
- Family: Dermabacteraceae
- Genus: Brachybacterium
- Species: B. endophyticum

Binomial name
- Brachybacterium endophyticum Tuo et al. 2018

Species of bacterium

Brachybacterium endophyticum is a species of Gram positive, facultatively anaerobic, halotolerant, cream-pigmented bacterium. The cells are coccoid during the stationary phase, and irregular rods during the exponential phase. It was first isolated from surface-sterilized bark of Scutellaria baicalensis from Guizhou, China. The species was first proposed in 2018, and the name refers to the fact that the bacteria is likely an endophyte.

The optimum growth temperature for B. endophyticum is 30 °C, but can grow in the 4-37 °C range. The pH optimum is 8.0, and can grow in the 5.0-11.0 range. The cells are halotolerant, and can grow in NaCl salt concentrations up to 15%.
