= Weissella hellenica =

Scientific classification
- Domain: Bacteria
- Kingdom: Bacillati
- Phylum: Bacillota
- Class: Bacilli
- Order: Lactobacillales
- Family: Lactobacillaceae
- Genus: Weissella
- Species: W. hellenica

Binomial name
- Weissella hellenica Collins et al. 1993

Species of bacterium

Weissella hellenica is a species of Gram-positive bacteria, placed within the family of Leuconostocaceae. It is frequently isolated from fermented sausage and flounder intestine, as well as Korean fermented pickle Kimchi and barrels used to make Japanese pickles. Some strains have been observed to be probiotic while some have not. Some strains produce bacteriocins named weissellicins which show antimicrobial activity against other bacteria.
