= Kocuria indica =

Scientific classification
- Domain: Bacteria
- Kingdom: Bacillati
- Phylum: Actinomycetota
- Class: Actinomycetes
- Order: Micrococcales
- Family: Micrococcaceae
- Genus: Kocuria
- Species: K. indica

Binomial name
- Kocuria indica Dastager et al. 2014

Type strain
- CCTCC AB 2011129; DSM 25126; NCIM 5455; NIO-1021

Species of bacterium

Kocuria indica is a species of bacteria in the genus Kocuria.
