= Brachybacterium muris =

Scientific classification
- Domain: Bacteria
- Kingdom: Bacillati
- Phylum: Actinomycetota
- Class: Actinomycetia
- Order: Micrococcales
- Family: Dermabacteraceae
- Genus: Brachybacterium
- Species: B. muris

Binomial name
- Brachybacterium muris Buczolits et al. 2003

Species of bacterium

Brachybacterium muris is a species of Gram positive, strictly aerobic, yellow-pigmented bacterium. The cells are coccoid during the stationary phase, and irregular rods during the exponential phase. It was first isolated from the liver of a laboratory mouse. The species was first described in 2003, and the name is derived from the Latin muris (mouse).

The optimum growth temperature for B. muris is 25-37 °C. It can grow in the 15-42 °C range and in pH 6.0-9.0.
