= Weissella bombi =

Scientific classification
- Domain: Bacteria
- Kingdom: Bacillati
- Phylum: Bacillota
- Class: Bacilli
- Order: Lactobacillales
- Family: Lactobacillaceae
- Genus: Weissella
- Species: W. bombi

Binomial name
- Weissella bombi Praet et al. 2015

Type strain
- DSM 28794, LMG 28290, R-53094

Species of bacterium

Weissella bombi is a bacterium from the genus of Weissella which has been isolated from the gut of the bumblebee Bombus terrestris from Ghent in Belgium.
