= Kocuria marina =

Scientific classification
- Domain: Bacteria
- Kingdom: Bacillati
- Phylum: Actinomycetota
- Class: Actinomycetes
- Order: Micrococcales
- Family: Micrococcaceae
- Genus: Kocuria
- Species: K. marina

Binomial name
- Kocuria marina Kim et al. 2004

Type strain
- CCUG 51442; DSM 16420; JCM 13363; KCTC 9943; KMM 3905

Species of bacterium

Kocuria marina is an aerobic, non-motile species of bacteria in the Gram-positive genus Kocuria, named for its identification from a sediment sample from the East Sea(동해). Compared to other members of the Kocuria genus, this species is uniquely capable of growing at osmotic pressures as high as 15% NaCl.

K. marina has the enzymes catalase, β-galactosidase, and urease, but it lacks arginine dihydrolase, lysine and ornithine decarboxylase, oxidase, and alkaline phosphatase. This species reduces nitrate, but it does not release hydrogen sulfide gas. It does not produce indole or acetoin, with the latter characteristic representing a negative Voges-Proskauer test result. It hydrolyzes casein and gelatin, but it cannot hydrolyze agar, cellulose, DNA, or starch. This species has a G/C content of 60%.

The antibiotics ampicillin, benzylpenicillin, carbenicillin, gentamicin, lincomycin, neomycin, oleandomycin, streptomycin, and tetracycline inhibit this species' growth.
