= Brachybacterium horti =

Scientific classification
- Domain: Bacteria
- Kingdom: Bacillati
- Phylum: Actinomycetota
- Class: Actinomycetia
- Order: Micrococcales
- Family: Dermabacteraceae
- Genus: Brachybacterium
- Species: B. horti

Binomial name
- Brachybacterium horti Singh et al. 2016

Species of bacterium

Brachybacterium horti is a species of Gram positive, facultatively anaerobic, white-pigmented bacterium. The cells are coccoid during the stationary phase, and irregular rods during the exponential phase. It was first isolated from soil from a garden in the Guro District of Seoul, South Korea. The species was first described in 2016, and the name is derived from the Latin horti (of/from a garden).

The optimum growth temperature for B. horti is 25-37 °C, but can grow in the 18-37 °C range. The optimum pH is 7.0, and can grow in pH 6.5-7.5.
