= Gluconacetobacter sacchari =

Scientific classification
- Domain: Bacteria
- Kingdom: Pseudomonadati
- Phylum: Pseudomonadota
- Class: Alphaproteobacteria
- Order: Rhodospirillales
- Family: Acetobacteraceae
- Genus: Gluconacetobacter
- Species: G. sacchari

Binomial name
- Gluconacetobacter sacchari Franke et al., 1999

Species of bacterium

Gluconacetobacter sacchari is a species of acetic acid bacteria first isolated from the leaf sheath of sugar cane and from the pink sugar-cane mealy bug (Saccharicoccus sacchari) on sugar cane growing in Queensland and northern New South Wales. The type strain of this species is strain SRI 1794T (=DSM 12717T). It is notable for its production of bacterial cellulose and for being an endophyte in sugar cane.
