= Weissella ceti =

Scientific classification
- Domain: Bacteria
- Kingdom: Bacillati
- Phylum: Bacillota
- Class: Bacilli
- Order: Lactobacillales
- Family: Lactobacillaceae
- Genus: Weissella
- Species: W. ceti

Binomial name
- Weissella ceti Vela et al. 2011

Type strain
- 1119-1A-09, CCUG 59653, CECT 7719

Species of bacterium

Weissella ceti is a Gram-positive and non-spore-forming bacterium from the genus of Weissella which was first isolated from beaked whales. Erstwhile believed that W. ceti could cause hemorrhagic illness in Rainbow trouts, however, seems to be a different species from the same genus: Weissella tructae.
