= Lactiplantibacillus fabifermentans =

Scientific classification
- Domain: Bacteria
- Kingdom: Bacillati
- Phylum: Bacillota
- Class: Bacilli
- Order: Lactobacillales
- Family: Lactobacillaceae
- Genus: Lactiplantibacillus
- Species: L. fabifermentans

Binomial name
- Lactiplantibacillus fabifermentans (De Bruyne et al. 2009) Zheng et al. 2020

Synonyms
- Lactobacillus fabifermentans De Bruyne et al. 2009

Species of bacterium

Lactiplantibacillus fabifermentans is a member of the genus Lactiplantibacillus and a type of lactic acid bacteria (LAB), a group of Gram-positive bacteria that produce lactic acid as their major fermented end product and that are often involved in food fermentation. L. fabifermentans was proposed in 2009 as a new species, after the type strain LMG 24284^{T} (DSM 21115^{T}) has been isolated from Ghanaian cocoa fermentation. Analysis of the 16S rRNA gene sequence demonstrated that this species is a member of the Lactobacillus plantarum species group but further analysis demonstrated that it is possible to differentiate it from the nearest neighbors by means of DNA-DNA hybridization experiments, pheS sequence analysis, whole-cell protein electrophoresis, fluorescent amplified fragment length polymorphism analysis and biochemical characterization.

The high similarity (>98%) among the 16S rRNA gene of L. fabifermentans with that of other species of the genus Lactobacillus (i.e. L. plantarum) made its identification difficult and probably led to an underestimation of its true environmental diffusion. Only in 2012-2013 this species was identified in various fermented foods, from Chinese pickle (where it was found together with Lactobacillus xiangfangensis), in Greek traditional cheeses and in dolo wort, an alcoholic fermented beverage produced in Burkina Faso. In 2013, 22 isolates belonging to L. fabifermentans were isolated from grape marcs and clearly separated from other members of the L. plantarum group by means of rep-PCR; this finding suggested that this is one of the more abundant microbial species surviving during the grape marc fermentation used for the production of Grappa, a traditional Italian alcoholic beverage.

Like for other lactobacilli, the capability of this species to survive during food products fermentation was due to some interesting phenotypic characters like the ability to use a wide range of different carbohydrates. The strain LMG 24284 isolated from cocoa fermentation for example is able to ferment cellobiose, galactose, maltose, mannitol, ribose, sucrose, trehalose, D-xylose, while the strain T30PCM01 isolated from fermenting grape marc was able to use mannose, fructose, cellobiose, mannitol, glucose, N-acetyl-glucosamine and L-arabinose.

The genome sequence of L. fabifermentans T30PCM01 (isolated from grape marc) was determined in 2014 and allowed to identify a high number of genes involved in carbohydrate transport and utilization. As for other members of the genus Lactobacillus, in the T30PCM01 strain, these genes are clustered in sugar utilization cassettes of which there are 65 in L. fabifermentans T30PCM01. This high number of cassettes is strictly linked to the ability of L. fabifermentans to use a wide range of different carbohydrates.

The 3,580,413 bp of the L. fabifermentans T30PCM01 genome sequence (https://www.ncbi.nlm.nih.gov/datasets/genome/GCF_000565485.1/) revealed that it is one of the Lactobacillus species with the larger genome. This was confirmed by the genome sequence of the LMG 24284T (DSM 21115T) strain isolated from cocoa (3,204,420 bp) that was also determined in 2014 (https://www.ncbi.nlm.nih.gov/datasets/genome/GCF_000498955.1/). The large genome size of L. fabifermentans suggests that it is a generalist and a very flexible and versatile species such as L. plantarum. This also suggests that its true environmental diffusion has been greatly underestimated.

Another interesting characteristic of this species is the ability to growth adherent to solid surfaces forming biofilm structures which are probably involved in determining the high resistance of this species to the extreme growth conditions present in grape marc fermentation and its ability to produce bacteriocins.
