= Brachybacterium aquaticum =

Scientific classification
- Domain: Bacteria
- Kingdom: Bacillati
- Phylum: Actinomycetota
- Class: Actinomycetia
- Order: Micrococcales
- Family: Dermabacteraceae
- Genus: Brachybacterium
- Species: B. aquaticum

Binomial name
- Brachybacterium aquaticum Kaur et al. 2016

Species of bacterium

Brachybacterium aquaticum is a species of Gram positive, strictly aerobic, pale yellow-pigmented bacterium. The cells are coccoid during the stationary phase, and irregular rods during the exponential phase. It was first isolated from a seawater sample collected from the coastal region of Kovalam, India off the Indian Ocean. The name is derived from Latin aquaticum (living in water).

The optimum growth temperature for B. aquaticum is 30 °C, but can grow in the 20-37 °C range. The optimum pH is 8.0 and can grow in pH 7.0-11.0.
