= Weissella oryzae =

Scientific classification
- Domain: Bacteria
- Kingdom: Bacillati
- Phylum: Bacillota
- Class: Bacilli
- Order: Lactobacillales
- Family: Lactobacillaceae
- Genus: Weissella
- Species: W. oryzae

Binomial name
- Weissella oryzae Tohno et al. 2013

Type strain
- DSM 25784, JCM 18191, SG25

Species of bacterium

Weissella oryzae is a Gram-positive bacterium from the genus of Weissella which has been isolated from fermented Japanese rice from Tochigi Prefecture in Japan.
