= Kocuria carniphila =

Scientific classification
- Domain: Bacteria
- Kingdom: Bacillati
- Phylum: Actinomycetota
- Class: Actinomycetia
- Order: Micrococcales
- Family: Micrococcaceae
- Genus: Kocuria
- Species: K. carniphila

Binomial name
- Kocuria carniphila Tvrzová et al. 2005

Type strain
- CCM 132; DSM 16004; JCM 14118

Species of bacterium

Kocuria carniphila is a species of bacteria in the genus Kocuria. It was first isolated from meat.

== Etymology ==
Its name comes from the Latin word caro, meaning "meat" combined with either the Latin word phila or the Ancient Greek word philê (φίλη), both of which mean "loving".
