= Acetobacter fabarum =

Scientific classification
- Domain: Bacteria
- Kingdom: Pseudomonadati
- Phylum: Pseudomonadota
- Class: Alphaproteobacteria
- Order: Rhodospirillales
- Family: Acetobacteraceae
- Genus: Acetobacter
- Species: A. fabarum

Binomial name
- Acetobacter fabarum Cleenwerck, et al. 2008

Type strain
- LMG 24244^{T} (= DSM 19596^{T})

Species of bacterium

Acetobacter fabarum is a bacterium that was first identified from fermenting cocoa beans in Ghana.

== Description ==
Acetobacter fabarum are gram-negative bacteria that appear as rounded rods, approximately 0.8 micrometers by 1.2 to 3 micrometers in size. If grown on agar plates, A. fabarum forms beige, round colonies that grow to 0.8 millimeters after three days at 28°C.

== See also ==
- Food microbiology
- List of microorganisms used in food and beverage preparation
