= Kocuria =

Scientific classification
- Domain: Bacteria
- Kingdom: Bacillati
- Phylum: Actinomycetota
- Class: Actinomycetes
- Order: Micrococcales
- Family: Micrococcaceae
- Genus: Kocuria; Stackebrandt et al. 1995

Type species
- Kocuria rosea (Flügge 1886) Stackebrandt et al. 1995

Species
- K. aegyptia Li et al. 2006; K. arsenatis Román-Ponce et al. 2016; "K. assamensis" Kaur et al. 2011; K. atrinae Park et al. 2010; K. carniphila Tvrzová et al. 2005; K. coralli Li and Zhang 2020; K. dechangensis Wang et al. 2015; K. flava Zhou et al. 2008; K. gwangalliensis Seo et al. 2009; K. himachalensis Mayilraj et al. 2006; K. indica Dastager et al. 2014; K. marina Kim et al. 2004; "K. massiliensis" Edouard et al. 2018; K. oceani Zhang et al. 2017; "K. ocularis" Domont et al. 2014; K. palustris Kovács et al. 1999; K. pelophila Hamada et al. 2016; K. polaris Reddy et al. 2003; K. rhizophila Kovács et al. 1999; K. rosea (Flügge 1886) Stackebrandt et al. 1995; K. salina Camacho et al. 2017; K. salsicia Yun et al. 2011; "K. sediminis" Bala et al. 2012; K. soli Tuo et al. 2019; K. subflava Jiang et al. 2016; K. turfanensis Zhou et al. 2008; "K. tytonicola" Braun et al. 2019; K. tytonis Braun et al. 2019; K. uropygialis Braun et al. 2018; K. uropygioeca Braun et al. 2018; K. varians (Migula 1900) Stackebrandt et al. 1995

Synonyms
- Pelczaria Poston 1994

Genus of bacteria

Kocuria is a genus of gram-positive bacteria. Kocuria is named after Miloslav Kocur, a Czech microbiologist. It has been found in the milk of water deer and reindeer. Cells are coccoid, resembling Staphylococcus and Micrococcus, and can group in pairs, chains, tetrads, cubical arrangements of eight, or irregular clusters. They have rigid cell walls and are either aerobic or facultative anaerobic. Kocuria can usually survive in mesophilic temperatures.

== Clinical significance ==
Kocuria has been found to live on human skin and oral cavity. It is generally considered non-pathogenic but can be found in some infections. Specific infection associated with Kocuria are urinary tract infections, cholecystitis, catheter-associated bacteremia, dacryocystitis, canaliculitis, keratitis, native valve endocarditis, peritonitis, descending necrotizing mediastinitis, brain abscess and meningitis. It is also occasionally isolated in the microbiome of pilonidal sinuses Kocuria rosea is known to cause infection in immunocompromised patients, causing oropharyngeal and deep cervical infections. However, as having low pathogenicity and being very susceptible to antibiotics, with immediate surgical drainage, debridement, and administration of broad range antibiotics showed great results.

== Microbiology ==
Kocuria can be grown on sheep blood agar and other simple media plates. They grow best in neutral pH environments. Depending on the species, they appear in a range of color such as: orange, pink, red, yellow or cream. They are shown to lack hemolytic ability on a blood agar plate. However, they have shown to react differently to normal laboratory identification techniques. These test include: catalase, urease, oxidase, amylase, gelatins, phosphatase, beta-galactosidase activities, and carbon source and citrate utilization. Kocuria is susceptible towards bacitracin and lysozyme and resistant to nitrofurantoin, furazolidone and lysostaphin.

== Environment ==
In a study done by Louisiana State University, 75 strains of bacteria from the Atacama Desert were tested for its ability to grow in Mars-like climates. The environment tested contained high concentrations of perchlorate salts, a similar condition found on Mars surface. In this environment, Kocuria was found to grow in one of the highest concentrations compared to the other strains.
