= Staphylococcus equorum =

Scientific classification
- Domain: Bacteria
- Kingdom: Bacillati
- Phylum: Bacillota
- Class: Bacilli
- Order: Bacillales
- Family: Staphylococcaceae
- Genus: Staphylococcus
- Species: S. equorum

Binomial name
- Staphylococcus equorum Schliefer et al. 1984

Species of bacterium

Staphylococcus equorum is a gram-positive, coagulase-negative member of the bacterial genus Staphylococcus consisting of clustered cocci. Originally isolated from the skin of healthy horses, this species contains a cell wall similar to that of Staphylococcus xylosus.

Strains of S. equorum have been isolated from sausage and strains comprising subspecies of this species have been isolated from Swiss mountain cheeses.
