= Brachybacterium fresconis =

Scientific classification
- Domain: Bacteria
- Kingdom: Bacillati
- Phylum: Actinomycetota
- Class: Actinomycetia
- Order: Micrococcales
- Family: Dermabacteraceae
- Genus: Brachybacterium
- Species: B. fresconis

Binomial name
- Brachybacterium fresconis Heyrman et al 2002

Species of bacterium

Brachybacterium fresconis is a species of Gram positive, strictly aerobic, cream-pigmented bacterium. The cells are coccoid during the stationary phase, and irregular rods during the exponential phase. It was first isolated from a medieval wall painting of the chapel of Schloss Herberstein in Styria, Austria. The species was proposed in 2014, and the name is derived from the fact it was first isolated from a fresco.

The optimum growth temperature for B. fresconis is 20-30 °C, but can grow in the 5-40 °C range.
