= Weissella soli =

Scientific classification
- Domain: Bacteria
- Kingdom: Bacillati
- Phylum: Bacillota
- Class: Bacilli
- Order: Lactobacillales
- Family: Lactobacillaceae
- Genus: Weissella
- Species: W. soli

Binomial name
- Weissella soli Magnusson et al. 2002

Type strain
- CCUG 46608, CECT 7031, CIP 107584, DSM 14420, JCM 12536, KCTC 3789, LMG 20113, Mi268

Species of bacterium

Weissella soli is a bacterium from the genus of Weissella which has been isolated from soil in Sweden.
