= Gluconacetobacter liquefaciens =

Scientific classification
- Domain: Bacteria
- Kingdom: Pseudomonadati
- Phylum: Pseudomonadota
- Class: Alphaproteobacteria
- Order: Rhodospirillales
- Family: Acetobacteraceae
- Genus: Gluconacetobacter
- Species: G. liquefaciens

Binomial name
- Gluconacetobacter liquefaciens corrig. (Asai 1935) Yamada et al. 1998

Synonyms
- Acetobacter aceti subsp. liquefaciens (Asai, 1935) De Ley & Frateur, 1974; Acetobacter liquefaciens (Asai, 1935) Gossele et al., 1983

Bacterium infecting plants

Gluconacetobacter liquefaciens is a bacterium in the family Acetobacteraceae. It infects plants and is responsible for spoilage in wine and beer made with such infected plants. In July 2022, the microbe was detected in certain magnesium citrate solutions that are sold as part of the preparatory procedure for colonoscopies and other proctological procedures, resulting in product recalls.
