= Weissella fabaria =

Scientific classification
- Domain: Bacteria
- Kingdom: Bacillati
- Phylum: Bacillota
- Class: Bacilli
- Order: Lactobacillales
- Family: Lactobacillaceae
- Genus: Weissella
- Species: W. fabaria

Binomial name
- Weissella fabaria De Bruyne et al. 2010

Type strain
- De Bruyne R-34085, De Vuyst 257, DSM 21416, LMG 24289

Species of bacterium

Weissella fabaria is a bacterium from the genus of Weissella which has been isolated from fermented cocoa beans from New Tafo in Ghana.
