= Weissella uvarum =

Scientific classification
- Domain: Bacteria
- Kingdom: Bacillati
- Phylum: Bacillota
- Class: Bacilli
- Order: Lactobacillales
- Family: Lactobacillaceae
- Genus: Weissella
- Species: W. uvarum

Binomial name
- Weissella uvarum Nisiotou et al. 2014

Type strain
- B18NM42, DSM 28060, NCCB 100484

Species of bacterium

Weissella uvarum is a bacterium from the genus of Weissella which has been isolated from wine grapes from Nemea in Greece.
