= Acetobacter senegalensis =

Scientific classification
- Domain: Bacteria
- Kingdom: Pseudomonadati
- Phylum: Pseudomonadota
- Class: Alphaproteobacteria
- Order: Rhodospirillales
- Family: Acetobacteraceae
- Genus: Acetobacter
- Species: A. senegalensis

Binomial name
- Acetobacter senegalensis Ndoye, 2007

Species of bacteria

Acetobacter senegalensis is a species of Alphaproteobacteria known for its tendency to live in certain fruit species and its potential in bacterial cellulose and vinegar production.

== Discovery ==
Acetobacter senegalensis was first described in 2007 from a strain isolated from mango wine in Senegal. Its binomial name is inspired by its country of origin.

== Growth and morphology ==
Acetobacter senegalensis is gram-negative, catalase-positive, oxidase-negative, and a strict aerobe. It is coccoid in shape, and measures roughly 1.2-2.0 μm in length and 0.8 μm in width. Growth has been observed between 28-40°C, with optimal growth occurring around 35°C. When grown on agar plates containing yeast extract, D-mannitol, and peptone, colonies are visible within 24 hours of incubation at 28°C, and appear circular, convex, and beige in color. A. senegalensis is capable of using glycerol as a sole carbon source; however, it cannot use maltose or methanol. Its inability to utilize methanol can be used to differentiate it from one of its closest relatives, Acetobacter tropicalis. It has the ability to produce acetic acid; however, acetic acid has been shown to damage A. senegalensis cells at a concentration of 1% w/v.

== Industrial utility ==
Acetobacter senegalensis, like other Acetobacter species, has the ability to produce vinegar. Due to its thermotolerant nature, it has been proposed as a useful species in the industrial production of vinegar in areas of the world that may be too hot for other acetic acid bacteria.

Acetobacter senegalensis is also known as a potential starter culture species in the cocoa bean fermentation process, although it may be outcompeted by its relative Acetobacter pasteurianus.

In addition, A. senegalensis has also been investigated for its ability to synthesize bacterial cellulose.
