= Weissella diestrammenae =

Scientific classification
- Domain: Bacteria
- Kingdom: Bacillati
- Phylum: Bacillota
- Class: Bacilli
- Order: Lactobacillales
- Family: Lactobacillaceae
- Genus: Weissella
- Species: W. diestrammenae

Binomial name
- Weissella diestrammenae Oh et al. 2013

Type strain
- JCM 18559, KACC 16890, ORY33

Species of bacterium

Weissella diestrammenae is a Gram-positive, facultatively anaerobic and non-motile bacterium from the genus of Weissella which has been isolated from the gut of the camel cricket Diestrammena coreana in Korea.
