= Brachybacterium ginsengisoli =

Scientific classification
- Domain: Bacteria
- Kingdom: Bacillati
- Phylum: Actinomycetota
- Class: Actinomycetia
- Order: Micrococcales
- Family: Dermabacteraceae
- Genus: Brachybacterium
- Species: B. ginsengisoli

Binomial name
- Brachybacterium ginsengisoli Hoang et al. 2014

Species of bacterium

Brachybacterium ginsengisoli is a species of Gram positive, strictly aerobic, opaque bacterium. The cells are coccoid during the stationary phase, and irregular rods during the exponential phase. It was first isolated from soil in a ginseng field in Yeoncheon County, South Korea. The species was first described in 2014, and the name is derived from the Latin ginsengum (ginseng) and solum (soil).

The optimum growth temperature for B. ginsengisoli is 25 °C, but can grow in the 4-34 °C range. The optimum pH is 6.5-7.5, and can grow in pH 5.0-10.0.
