= Weissella beninensis =

Scientific classification
- Domain: Bacteria
- Kingdom: Bacillati
- Phylum: Bacillota
- Class: Bacilli
- Order: Lactobacillales
- Family: Lactobacillaceae
- Genus: Weissella
- Species: W. beninensis

Binomial name
- Weissella beninensis Padonou et al. 2010

Type strain
- 2L24P13, DSM 22752, JCM 18047, LMG 25373

Species of bacterium

Weissella kimchii is a Gram-positive bacterium from the genus of Weissella which has been isolated from fermented cassava from Ketou in Benin.
