= Brachybacterium nesterenkovii =

Scientific classification
- Domain: Bacteria
- Kingdom: Bacillati
- Phylum: Actinomycetota
- Class: Actinomycetia
- Order: Micrococcales
- Family: Dermabacteraceae
- Genus: Brachybacterium
- Species: B. nesterenkovii

Binomial name
- Brachybacterium nesterenkovii Gvozdyak et al. 1992

Species of bacterium

Brachybacterium nesterenkovii is a species of Gram positive, facultatively anaerobic, yellow-pigmented bacterium. The cells are coccoid during the stationary phase, and irregular rods during the exponential phase. It was first isolated from milk products in 1984. The species was first described in 1992, and is named for O. A. Nesterenko, "a Ukrainian microbiologist who has made a valuable contribution to the systematics of coryneform and nocardioform bacteria".

The optimum growth temperature for B. nesterenkovii is 18 to 37 °C (64 to 99 °F).
