= Lactiplantibacillus paraplantarum =

Scientific classification
- Domain: Bacteria
- Kingdom: Bacillati
- Phylum: Bacillota
- Class: Bacilli
- Order: Lactobacillales
- Family: Lactobacillaceae
- Genus: Lactiplantibacillus
- Species: L. paraplantarum

Binomial name
- Lactiplantibacillus paraplantarum (Curk et al. 1996) Zheng et al. 2020

Synonyms
- Lactobacillus paraplantarum Curk et al. 1996

Species of bacterium

Lactiplantibacillus paraplantarum is a rod-shaped species of lactic acid bacteria first isolated from beer and human faeces. It is facultatively heterofermentative. Strain CNRZ 1885 (= CIP 104668) is the type strain.
