= Acetobacter pomorum =

Scientific classification
- Domain: Bacteria
- Kingdom: Pseudomonadati
- Phylum: Pseudomonadota
- Class: Alphaproteobacteria
- Order: Rhodospirillales
- Family: Acetobacteraceae
- Genus: Acetobacter
- Species: A. pomorum

Binomial name
- Acetobacter pomorum Sokollek et al. 1998

Species of bacterium

Acetobacter pomorum is a bacterium first isolated from industrial vinegar fermentations. Its type strain is LTH 2458^{T}.
