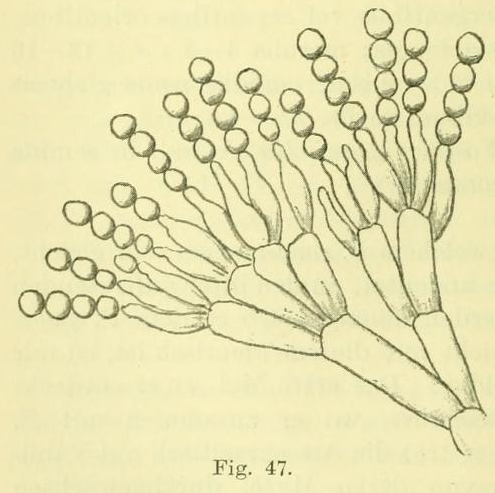

Scientific classification
- Kingdom: Fungi
- Division: Ascomycota
- Class: Eurotiomycetes
- Order: Eurotiales
- Family: Aspergillaceae
- Genus: Penicillium
- Species: P. solitum

Binomial name
- Penicillium solitum Westling, R. 1911

Type strain
- ATCC 9923, Biourge 3, CBS 288.36, CBS 424.89, CCT 4377, FRR 0937, IBT 3948, IFO 7765, IMI 039810, IMI 092225, LSHB P52, MUCL 28668, MUCL 29173, NBRC 7765, NCTC 3029, NRRL 937, Thom 2546, Thom 4733.114, Thom, 2546, VKM F-3087

Synonyms
- Penicillium majusculum; Penicillium casei var. compactum; Penicillium mali; Penicillium verrucosum var. melanochlorum

= Penicillium solitum =

Species of fungus

Penicillium solitum is an anamorphic, mesophilic, salinity-tolerant, and psychrotolerant species of fungus in the genus Penicillium. It is known to produce various compounds including polygalacturonase, compactin, cyclopenin, cyclopenol, cyclopeptin, dehydrocompactin, dihydrocyclopeptin, palitantin, solistatin, solistatinol, viridicatin, viridicatol.

P. Solitum forms dark blueish-green colonies that measure 22–28 mm in diameter on Czaek yeast extract agar, while on malt extract agar, it appears brownish orange. This distinct orange-brown color sets P. solitum apart from other similar Penicillium species, making it useful for differentiation. The fungus has been historically isolated from various sources, including cheese rinds, cured meats, and the Antarctic environment. It was specifically isolated from air-dried lamb thighs on the Faore island. During the production of traditional Tyrolean smoked and cured ham, both Penicillium solitum and Eurotium rubrum are commonly found.

Furthermore, Penicillium solitum is known to be a pathogen of pomaceous fruit,P. solitum causes blue rot in pome fruits through its production of polygalacturonase, which breaks down the apple’s cell wall.

== Domestication ==
Domestication in food associated fungi is often accompanied by changes in traits important for survival in natural environments. This includes reduced pigmentation, stress tolerance, and sporulation, while adding traits that are favorable for growth on human foods. A study was conducted at Jasper Hill Farm in Greensboro, which showed such changes in a population of Penicillium solitum on the rind of blue cheese over about a decade. Surveys across samples collected from 2016, 2022, and 2024, shows that Penicillium solitum remained the dominant mold throughout this period which suggests that the color shift was not due to a species replacement but due to a phenotypic change within the resident population. White strains produce significantly less melanin and fewer spores than green stains, while maintaining similar mycelial growth. Many of the mutations associated with this loss of pigmentation, like troglomorphism, were caused by insertions of transposable elements, a genomic mechanism increasingly recognized as contributing to the domestication of food associated fungi. In experiments with cheese curds, white strains outcompeted green strains in darkness but loss under light. These results suggest that reduced melanin production contributes to a fitness advantage in the dark and stable conditions of cheese caves. Cheesemakers considered white rind desirable for aesthetic and management reasons. They allowed these stains to persist and have been using them intentionally in the production of other cheese. Based on these observations, the development of traits consistent with those seen in food-associated fungi, and humans allowing for the fungi to grow, the authors suggest that this represents unintentional microbial domestication.
