= Staphylococcus simulans =

Scientific classification
- Domain: Bacteria
- Kingdom: Bacillati
- Phylum: Bacillota
- Class: Bacilli
- Order: Bacillales
- Family: Staphylococcaceae
- Genus: Staphylococcus
- Species: S. simulans

Binomial name
- Staphylococcus simulans Kloos et al. 1975

Species of bacterium

Staphylococcus simulans is a Gram-positive, coagulase-negative member of the bacterial genus Staphylococcus consisting of single, paired, and clustered cocci.
