= Lactiplantibacillus =

Scientific classification
- Domain: Bacteria
- Kingdom: Bacillati
- Phylum: Bacillota
- Class: Bacilli
- Order: Lactobacillales
- Family: Lactobacillaceae
- Genus: Lactiplantibacillus; Zheng et al. 2020

Type species
- Lactiplantibacillus plantarum (Orla-Jensen 1919) Zheng et al. 2020

Species
- See text

Synonyms
- "Streptobacterium" Orla-Jensen 1919

Genus of bacteria

Lactiplantibacillus is a genus of lactic acid bacteria.

== Species ==
The genus Lactiplantibacillus comprises the following species:

- Lactiplantibacillus argentoratensis (Bringel et al. 2005) Liu and Gu 2020
- Lactiplantibacillus daoliensis (Liu and Gu 2019) Zheng et al. 2020
- Lactiplantibacillus daowaiensis (Liu and Gu 2019) Zheng et al. 2020
- Lactiplantibacillus dongliensis (Liu and Gu 2019) Zheng et al. 2020
- Lactiplantibacillus fabifermentans (De Bruyne et al. 2009) Zheng et al. 2020
- Lactiplantibacillus garii Zheng et al. 2020
- Lactiplantibacillus herbarum (Mao et al. 2015) Zheng et al. 2020
- Lactiplantibacillus modestisalitolerans (Miyashita et al. 2015) Zheng et al. 2020
- Lactiplantibacillus mudanjiangensis (Gu et al. 2013) Zheng et al. 2020
- Lactiplantibacillus nangangensis (Liu and Gu 2019) Zheng et al. 2020
- Lactiplantibacillus paraplantarum (Curk et al. 1996) Zheng et al. 2020
- Lactiplantibacillus pentosus (Zanoni et al. 1987) Zheng et al. 2020 2026>
- Lactiplantibacillus pingfangensis (Liu and Gu 2019) Zheng et al. 2020
- Lactiplantibacillus plajomi (Miyashita et al. 2015) Zheng et al. 2020
- Lactiplantibacillus plantarum (Orla-Jensen 1919) Zheng et al. 2020
- Lactiplantibacillus songbeiensis (Liu and Gu 2019) Zheng et al. 2020
- Lactiplantibacillus xiangfangensis (Gu et al. 2012) Zheng et al. 2020

== Phylogeny ==
The currently accepted taxonomy is based on the List of Prokaryotic names with Standing in Nomenclature and the phylogeny is based on whole-genome sequences.

- - Lactiplantibacillus
    - - - - - - Lactiplantibacillus daoliensis
              - Lactiplantibacillus nangangensis
            - Lactiplantibacillus pingfangensis
          - - Lactiplantibacillus xiangfangensis
            - - Lactiplantibacillus modestisalitolerans
              - Lactiplantibacillus plajomi
        - - Lactiplantibacillus herbarum
          - - Lactiplantibacillus fabifermentans
            - - Lactiplantibacillus paraplantarum
              - - Lactiplantibacillus pentosus
                - Lactiplantibacillus plantarum
      - - Lactiplantibacillus daowaiensis
        - Lactiplantibacillus mudanjiangensis
    - - Lactiplantibacillus dongliensis
      - Lactiplantibacillus songbeiensis
  - outgroup
    Holzapfelia
