= Weissella cibaria =

Scientific classification
- Domain: Bacteria
- Kingdom: Bacillati
- Phylum: Bacillota
- Class: Bacilli
- Order: Lactobacillales
- Family: Lactobacillaceae
- Genus: Weissella
- Species: W. cibaria

Binomial name
- Weissella cibaria Björkroth et al. 2002

Synonyms
- Weissella kimchii Choi et al. 2002

Species of bacterium

Weissella cibaria is a species of Gram-positive bacteria, placed within the family of Leuconostocaceae. W. cibaria CMGDEX3 was reported from Pakistan to produce high molecular weight, linear dextran with predominant (1→6) linkages.
