= Staphylococcus succinus =

Scientific classification
- Domain: Bacteria
- Kingdom: Bacillati
- Phylum: Bacillota
- Class: Bacilli
- Order: Bacillales
- Family: Staphylococcaceae
- Genus: Staphylococcus
- Species: S. succinus

Binomial name
- Staphylococcus succinus Lambert et al. 1998

Species of bacterium

Staphylococcus succinus is a Gram-positive coccoid bacterium belonging to the genus Staphylococcus.

== History ==
This species was first described in 1998 and was isolated from 25- to 35-million-year-old Dominican amber.

== Taxonomy ==
Two subspecies are recognised:

- Staphylococcus succinus subsp. casei
- Staphylococcus succinus subsp. succinus

== Epidemiology ==
This species has been isolated from cheese, sausages and the skin of healthy wild animals, and wild caught Drosophila.

== Clinical ==
Staphylococcus succinus subsp. succinus PK-1 is a crucial pathogen to study the evolution of immune response, this pathogen was isolated by Karan Singh during his PhD at the Indian Institute of Science Education and Research Mohali. Other species has been isolated from human clinical material, but its role in pathogenesis has yet to be clarified.
