= Brachybacterium conglomeratum =

Scientific classification
- Domain: Bacteria
- Kingdom: Bacillati
- Phylum: Actinomycetota
- Class: Actinomycetia
- Order: Micrococcales
- Family: Dermabacteraceae
- Genus: Brachybacterium
- Species: B. conglomeratum

Binomial name
- Brachybacterium conglomeratum (ex Migula 1900) Takeuchi et al. 1995

Species of bacterium

Brachybacterium conglomeratum is a species of Gram positive, facultatively anaerobic, whitish yellow to pale brown pigmented bacterium. The cells are coccoid during the stationary phase, and irregular rods during the exponential phase. The species was originally classified as Micrococcus conglomeratus for over 60 years, until most species were reclassified as Brachybacterium conglomeratum in 1995. The name is derived from Latin conglomeratum (rolled together).
