= Isolates =

Isolates is a term used in developmental psychology and family studies to describe members of a study group, usually children through young adults, who do not actively participate in cliques or friendship groups. Isolates are one of four types of participants in friendship networks, the other three being dyads, liaisons, and cliques.

Isolates may have friendly relations with members of cliques and friendship groups, but they do not associate their identity with any particular group. Isolates can be voluntarily or involuntarily isolated from peer groups, cliques, or friendship groups. Overall, isolates may experience higher levels of depression than same-age peers. Studies by Ennett and Bauman (1993) found that isolates were more prone to smoke than members of friendship groups. A study by Henrich et al. (2000) shows that isolates, both male and female, have more internalizing problems than non-isolates. The study also indicates that female isolates have significantly lower GPAs than members of cliques.
