= Staphylococcus fleurettii =

Scientific classification
- Domain: Bacteria
- Kingdom: Bacillati
- Phylum: Bacillota
- Class: Bacilli
- Order: Bacillales
- Family: Staphylococcaceae
- Genus: Staphylococcus
- Species: S. fleurettii

Binomial name
- Staphylococcus fleurettii Vernozy-Rozand et al. 2000

Species of bacterium

Staphylococcus fleurettii is a Gram-positive, coagulase-negative member of the bacterial genus Staphylococcus consisting of single, paired, and clustered cocci. Strains of this species were originally isolated from raw-milk goat cheese.
