= Roncal cheese =

Spanish cheese

Roncal
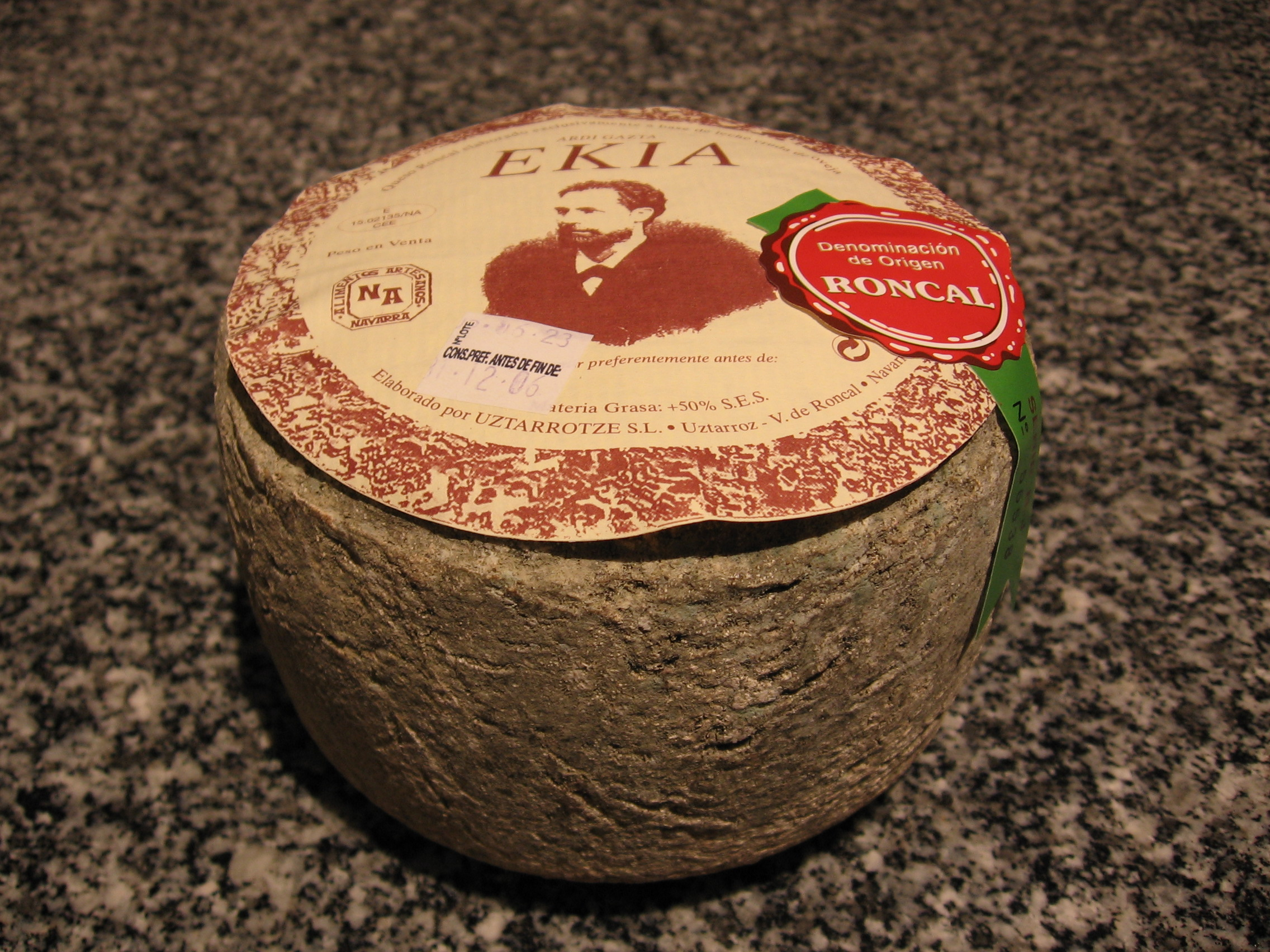
- Country of origin: Spain
- Region: Navarre
- Source of milk: Sheep
- Texture: Hard Semi-hard Soft
- Certification: PDO 1981, 1996

Roncal (Erronkariko gazta in Basque) is a hard, creamy sheep milk cheese. It is made in one of seven villages in the Valle de Roncal of Spain.

Roncal has been granted PDO status. Food writer Claudia Roden describes Roncal as "soft, aromatic, slightly sharp and picquant".
