= Gluconacetobacter =

Scientific classification
- Domain: Bacteria
- Kingdom: Pseudomonadati
- Phylum: Pseudomonadota
- Class: Alphaproteobacteria
- Order: Rhodospirillales
- Family: Acetobacteraceae
- Genus: Gluconacetobacter corrig. Yamada et al. 1998

Type species
- Gluconoacetobacter liquefaciens (Asai 1935) Yamada et al. 1998

Species
- See text

Synonyms
- Gluconoacetobacter Yamada et al. 1998

Genus of bacteria

Gluconacetobacter is a genus in the phylum Pseudomonadota (Bacteria). In 2012, several species previously classified in the genus Gluconacetobacter were reclassified under the new genus Komagataeibacter, including the cellulose producing species Komagataeibacter xylinus.

== Etymology ==
The name Gluconacetobacter derives from: Neo-Latin acidum gluconicum, gluconic acid; Latin noun acetum, vinegar; Neo-Latin bacter, rod; giving Gluconacetobacter, gluconate-vinegar rod.

== Species ==
The genus contains the following species:

- Gluconacetobacter aggeris corrig. Nishijima et al. 2013
- Gluconacetobacter asukensis Tazato et al. 2012
- Gluconacetobacter azotocaptans Fuentes-Ramírez et al. 2001
- Gluconacetobacter diazotrophicus corrig. (Gillis et al. 1989) Yamada et al. 1998
- Gluconacetobacter dulcium Sombolestani et al. 2021
- Gluconacetobacter entanii Schüller et al. 2000
- Gluconacetobacter johannae Fuentes-Ramírez et al. 2001
- Gluconacetobacter liquefaciens corrig. (Asai 1935) Yamada et al. 1998
- Gluconacetobacter sacchari Franke et al. 1999
- Gluconacetobacter takamatsuzukensis Nishijima et al. 2013
- Gluconacetobacter tumulicola Tazato et al. 2012
- Gluconacetobacter tumulisoli Nishijima et al. 2013

== See also ==
- Bacterial taxonomy
- Kombucha
- Microbiology
