= Kocuria rhizophila =

Scientific classification
- Domain: Bacteria
- Kingdom: Bacillati
- Phylum: Actinomycetota
- Class: Actinomycetes
- Order: Micrococcales
- Family: Micrococcaceae
- Genus: Kocuria
- Species: K. rhizophila

Binomial name
- Kocuria rhizophila Kovács et al. 1999

Type strain
- ATCC BAA-50; CIP 105972; DSM 11926; IFO 16319; JCM 11653; NBRC 16319; TA68

Species of bacterium

Kocuria rhizophila is a soil dwelling Gram positive bacterium in the genus Kocuria. It is used in industry for antimicrobial testing and in food preparation. The genome of K. rhizophila BT304 from the bovine intestine is a 2.76-Mb circular chromosome with over 2,300 coding sequences, demonstrating notable metabolic versatility. The type strain of K. rhizophila contains only a small number of secondary-metabolite biosynthesis genes, suggesting it is specialized for primary metabolism rather than complex metabolite production. However, several studies show the ability of this species to break down complex compounds. [MR1.1] Several strains of Kocuria rhizophila contain genes for aromatic-compound degradation through the phenylacetate (PAA) pathway, suggesting they can break down plant-derived or pollutant aromatics. A keratin-degrading strain of K. rhizophila was found to break down about 52% of chicken-feather keratin in four days at 25 °C, showing potential for keratin-waste biodegradation. K. rhizophila has been identified as an opportunistic pathogen, including a documented case of persistent bloodstream infection associated with a contaminated central venous catheter.

Some strains of K. rhizophila were previously classified as strains of the similar bacterium Micrococcus luteus.

== Genome ==
The genome has been sequenced and contains 2,697,540 base pairs, which is among the smallest for Actinomycetota, with a G+C content of 71.16%. This encodes 2357 protein coding genes, including many transporters and enzymes for the transformation of phenolic compounds, contributing to its ability to metabolize plant material.
