= Lactobacillus acetotolerans =

Scientific classification
- Domain: Bacteria
- Kingdom: Bacillati
- Phylum: Bacillota
- Class: Bacilli
- Order: Lactobacillales
- Family: Lactobacillaceae
- Genus: Lactobacillus
- Species: L. acetotolerans

Binomial name
- Lactobacillus acetotolerans Etsuzo Entani, Hiroshi Masai and Ken-Ichiro Suzuki, 1986

Species of bacterium

Lactobacillus acetotolerans (Neo-Latin 'vinegar-tolerating milk-bacillus') is a species of gram positive bacteria in the genus Lactobacillus. Discovered in rice wine vinegar, it has a very high tolerance for acetic acid. It can tolerate an acetic acid concentration of over 9% and a pH as low as 3.3. It is known to produce sour flavors in beer it invades, by producing lactic acid.
