= Brachybacterium alimentarium =

Scientific classification
- Domain: Bacteria
- Kingdom: Bacillati
- Phylum: Actinomycetota
- Class: Actinomycetia
- Order: Micrococcales
- Family: Dermabacteraceae
- Genus: Brachybacterium
- Species: B. alimentarium

Binomial name
- Brachybacterium alimentarium Schubert et al. 1996

Species of bacterium

Brachybacterium alimentarium is a species of Gram positive, facultatively anaerobic, yellow-pigmented bacterium. The cells are coccoid during the stationary phase, and irregular rods during the exponential phase. It was first isolated from the surfaces of Beaufort and Gruyère cheeses in 1978. Further work led to the proposal of the new species in 1996, and the name is derived from the Latin alimentanium (pertaining to food).

The optimum growth temperature for B. alimentarium is 30 °C, but can grow in the 20-37 °C range. The optimum pH is 7.3.
