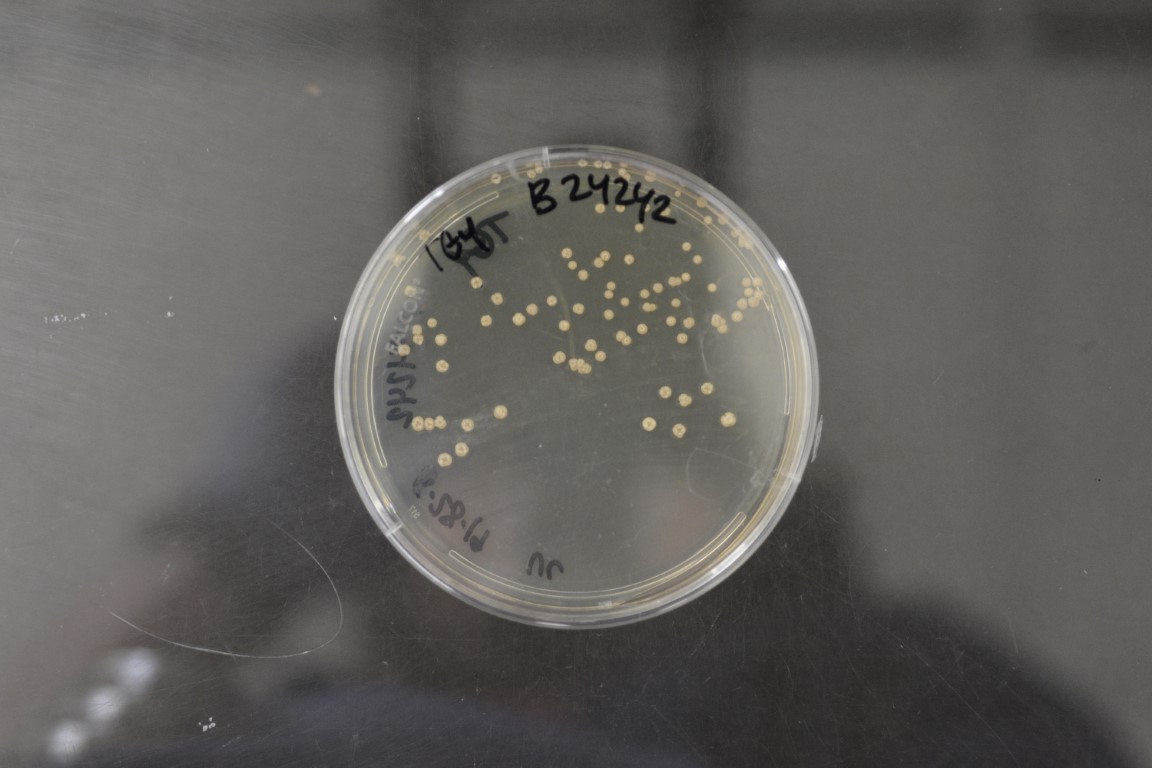

Scientific classification
- Domain: Bacteria
- Kingdom: Bacillati
- Phylum: Actinomycetota
- Class: Actinomycetia
- Order: Micrococcales
- Family: Microbacteriaceae
- Genus: Microbacterium
- Species: M. gubbeenense

Binomial name
- Microbacterium gubbeenense Brennan et al. 2001

Type strain
- DPC 5286; DSM 15944; JCM 12075; LMG 19263; LMG S-19263; NBRC 103073; NCIMB 30129

= Microbacterium gubbeenense =

Species of bacterium

Microbacterium gubbeenense is a Gram-positive, facultatively anaerobic, non-spore-forming and non-motile bacterium from the genus Microbacterium which has been isolated from the surface of a smear-ripened cheese in Ireland.
