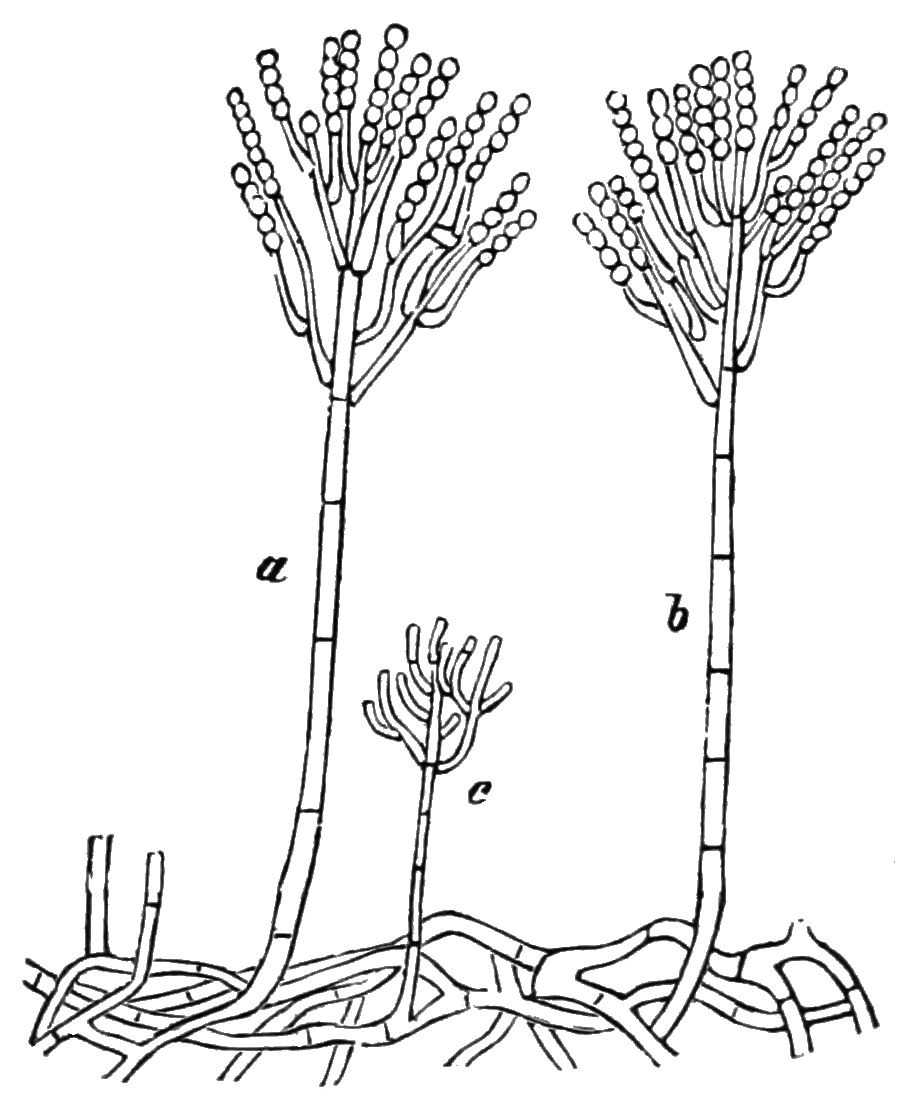
- Penicillium crustaceum

Scientific classification
- Kingdom: Fungi
- Division: Ascomycota
- Class: Eurotiomycetes
- Order: Eurotiales
- Family: Aspergillaceae
- Genus: Penicillium
- Species: P. nalgiovense

Binomial name
- Penicillium nalgiovense Laxa, O. 1932

Type strain
- 5337.2, ATCC 10472, BCRC 31671, CBS 101030, CBS 352.48, CCF 1728, CCRC 31671, DSM 897, FRR 0911, IBT 21536, IBT 3800, IBT 3861, ICMP 5611, IFO 8112, IHEM 5837, IMI 039804, MUCL 31194, NBRC 8112 NRRL 911, QM 7600, Thom 5337.2

Synonyms
- Penicillium nalgiovensis

= Penicillium nalgiovense =

Species of fungus

Penicillium nalgiovense is an anamorph species of the genus Penicillium with lipolytic and proteolytic activity, which was first isolated from ellischau cheese made in Nalžovy (Ellischau), Nalžovské Hory, Czech Republic. This species produces dichlorodiaportin, diaportinol, and diaportinic acid Penicillium nalgiovense is used for the maturation of certain fermented salami varieties and ham. In this process it protects the meat from colonization by other molds and bacteria It was firstly isolated and described by professor Otakar Laxa in 1932.
