= Deep litter =

Animal housing system

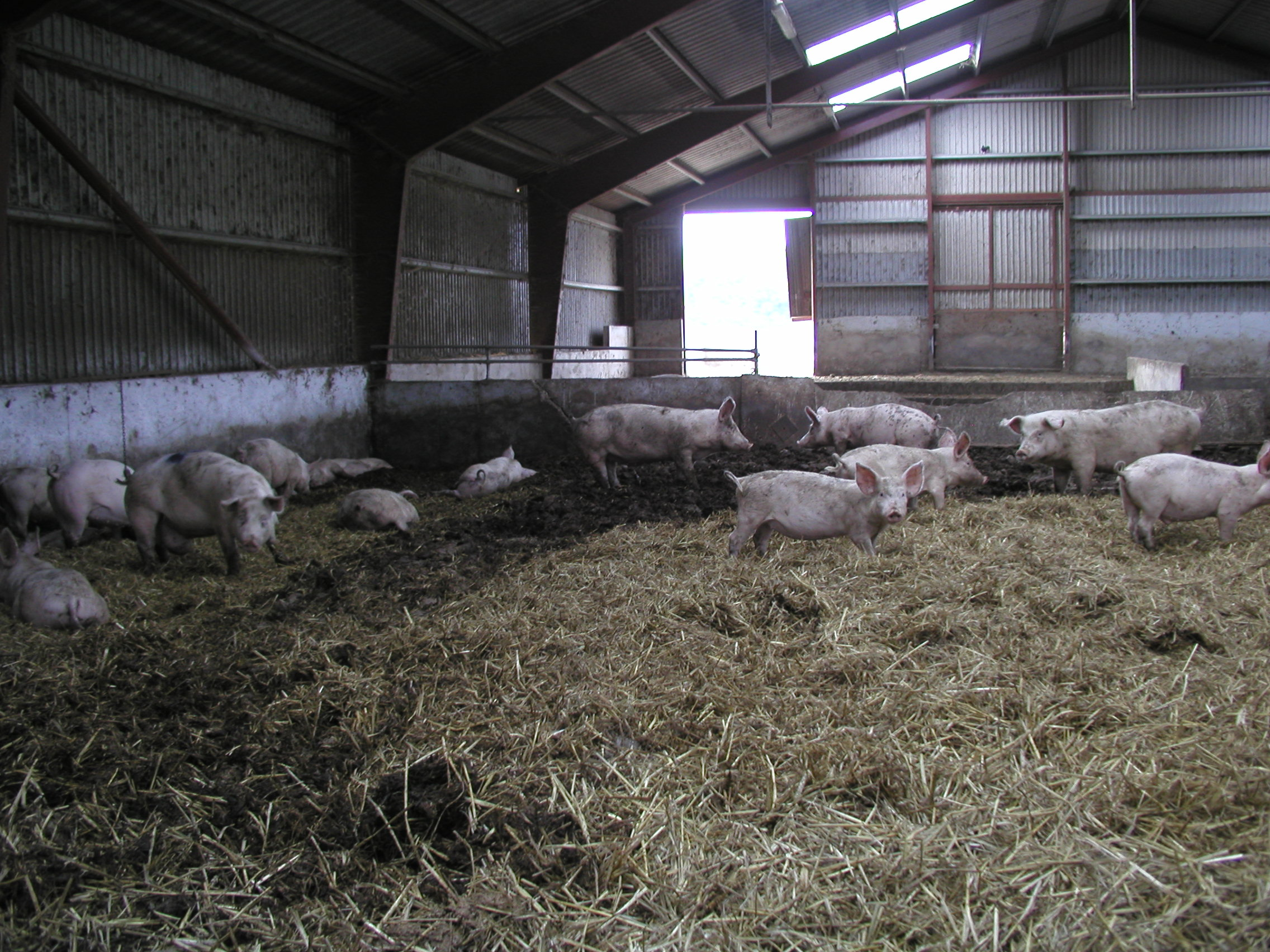
Pigs kept on deep-litter material

Deep litter is an animal housing system, based on the repeated spreading of straw or sawdust material in indoor booths. An initial layer of litter is spread for the animals to use for bedding material and to defecate in, and as the litter is soiled, new layers of litter are continuously added by the farmer. In this fashion, a deep litter bedding can build up to depths of 1–2 meters. "The usual procedure for built-up floor litter is to start with about 4 inches (100 mm) of fine litter material with additions of 1 to 2 inches (25 to 50 mm) later as needed without removal of the old. A depth of 6 to 12 inches (150 to 300 mm) is maintained by partial removals from time to time." Many consider this to be a natural means to disposing of animal feces. "The deep litter cultivation is a modern ecological breeding technique based on decomposing feces by microbiological methods, a post processing method for poultry Manure."

== History ==
The deep litter method was first used in 1946 by the Ohio Station Brooder House. Before the deep litter method, shavings were removed every one to two weeks, in order to avoid dampness and coccidia. Later, it was discovered that deep litter provides adequate protection from these naturally. The deeper litter provides extra insulation in colder temperatures, as well as extra heat from the decomposition of the litter. Another potential benefit is that when raised under conditions that don't provide adequate nutrition, deep litter poultry is healthier than poultry raised in the traditional method of housing. "By not removing the waste, good microbes come and make their homes in the litter. These microbes actually eat and break down the feces and consume unhealthy bacteria, leaving good bacteria behind."

== Benefits ==
Numerous benefits have been discovered with the use of the deep litter system, also called the "build-up method". One is the increased ability of poultry to fight off coccidia, common bacteria responsible for an average of a 20% death rate of poultry. New studies in Ohio have shown death rates from coccidia as low as 2.9%. As many as 6 successive broods of chicks have been raised on the same litter, each brood showing better results. Chickens raised in this environment have also been less inclined to show cannibalistic traits.

Many studies have been done in order to research potential advantages and disadvantages of the deep litter system. This research covers multiple types of livestock including poultry, swine, duck, and cattle.

"The first experimental evidence with reference to the user of built-up litter as a sanitary procedure was secured by the Ohio Station in 1946 when it was first used in the brooder house. During the three years previous when the floor litter was removed and renewed at frequent intervals, the average mortality of 10 broods, or a total of 18,000 chicks, was 19 percent. During the succeeding three years with the use of built-up litter, the average mortality of 11 broods, or a total of 10,000 chicks, was 7 percent. Seldom did a brood escape an attack of coccidiosis before the use of built-up litter. Afterward there was no noticeable trouble from coccidiosis in 11 consecutive broods started and raised on the same old built-up floor litter. Old built-up litter is floor litter which has been used by two or more previous broods of chicks." To build immunity against coccidia, chicks are normally vaccinated. Experiments have shown that deep litter is an effective method of exposing chicks to the bacteria at a safe rate. Chicken feces produces ammonia which is known for killing coccidia. "A 10 percent solution of ammonia spray is considered effective for killing coccidia. Being unable to withstand such a spray, they may likewise be unable to withstand the constant ammoniacal atmosphere in built-up litter."

Experiments have shown major potential benefits to utilizing the deep litter method, specifically within piggeries. Pigs raised in a deep litter system, do significantly better than pigs raised under similar conditions, on a concrete floor, which is the traditional method. Studies have shown that pigs raised in a deep litter system have a lower feed to gain ratio, produce a higher quality of pork, create a significantly lower amount of gaseous emissions, show improvements in odor nuisance reduction, and have better animal welfare. "Pigs in the deep litter system had greater color score and rate of cooking meat, while they had lower drip loss and cooking loss than loins from concrete-floor system housed pigs." (ZHOU et al. 426) "Results indicate that pigs raised in the deep-litter system had some animal welfare improvements and an odor nuisance reduction; in the meantime, pork quality also improved from the deep-litter system compared to the pigs housed in the concrete-floor system." (ZHOU, abstract) Gaseous emissions were also lower within the deep litter system when compared to traditional systems. "NH3 concentration in the deep-litter system was significantly lower than that in the concrete-floor system" (ZHOU et al. 425) "Deep litter and outdoor production avoids the large quantities of methane normally generated from effluent ponds in conventional piggeries". This study helped to prove numerous benefits not only to our atmosphere, but to the health and animal welfare of the pigs.

== Negative effects ==
A study was conducted to determine the effects on the reproductive system caused by different living styles, for poultry. The deep litter system provided lower efficiency in terms of reproduction, and an increase of food intake. "Feed intake was lower (p < 0.05) in legumes and green pasture than deep litter suggesting economic benefit. It was concluded that access to legumes enhanced the performance of layers compared to deep litter and green pasture as indicated by the parameters measured." (Oke, Abstract) This particular study determined that the deep litter method was not beneficial in terms of egg layer production in chickens.

A study was conducted in three intensive duck farms in China that utilised routine prophylactic antibiotics. This attempted to determine the ability for antibiotic resistant bacteria, to accumulate in meat duck deep litter where the ducks would subsequently excrete the antibiotics and heavy metals from growth promoters and feeds into the litter. Levels were measured at 3 different stages of duck life, in 3 different barns. The litter contained high levels of antibiotics and heavy metals that corresponded to the antibiotics, feed and supplements that the ducks received throughout their growth cycle. "E. coli isolated from the 3 stages of sampling were highly resistant to ampicillin, tetracycline, florfenicol, and doxycycline. Increased resistance to ceftiofur, enrofloxacin, ofloxacin, and gentamicin were seen in the isolates from the final stage of deep litter." (Linn, Abstract) This study concluded that "deep litter could be suitable for the evolution of bacterial antibiotic-resistance under conditions of continuous usage or accumulation of antibiotics and heavy metals without proper management." (Linn, Abstract) This paper highlights the risk of introducing the routine use of antibiotics, growth promoting supplements and pesticides rather than a direct contribution of deep litter systems. This paper did not utilise a control environment that avoided growth promoters or routine antibiotics.

Problems may arise from the deep litter method such as rotten bed. This occurs mostly in piggeries, and is caused by high levels of water intake and discharge from the animals, as well as discharging in the same location within the pen. The build-up of moisture cannot be absorbed quickly enough to fully decompose and causes rotting, unpleasant odors, and harmful gases. Experiments to solve this problem have taken place. One process, is called the heat pulse method. This method, refers to heating the bedding at a constant temperature, which causes a buildup of steam beneath the bedding. However, the steam is unable to release itself, so the next step is to pulse oxygen into the bedding, allowing the steam to escape. "The pulse method could promote the timely discharge of steam generated inside the bedding." (Li, 1412)

== Innovations ==
This type of farming has created a new market for sheds specifically designed to utilize the deep litter method. Companies are realizing that this method has multiple benefits and is being accepted by various governments as a greener method of farming. "It has won the support of the government and acceptance of market." (QIN, 1) One type of building being constructed is called the removable deep litter breeding shed. It consists of larger areas for the animals, space to let the litter build to heights not allowed by traditional housing, and economic costs compared to traditional sheds. "Successful exploiture of breeding supporting facilities will greatly promote the development of deep-litter breeding technology in local farms." (QIN, 1)
