= Acetobacter cerevisiae =

Scientific classification
- Domain: Bacteria
- Kingdom: Pseudomonadati
- Phylum: Pseudomonadota
- Class: Alphaproteobacteria
- Order: Rhodospirillales
- Family: Acetobacteraceae
- Genus: Acetobacter
- Species: A. cerevisiae

Binomial name
- Acetobacter cerevisiae Cleenwerck et al. 2002

Species of bacterium

Acetobacter cerevisiae is a species of Gram negative acetic acid bacteria. Its type strain is LMG 1625^{T} (= DSM 14362^{T} = NCIB 8894^{T} = ATCC 23765^{T}).

== History ==
The species was identified in 2002 by DNA-DNA hybridization as a group of related strains previously designated Acetobacter pasteurianus which were closely related to one another but not to other A. pasteurianus strains. These strains were all originally isolated from breweries.
