= Weissella thailandensis =

Scientific classification
- Domain: Bacteria
- Kingdom: Bacillati
- Phylum: Bacillota
- Class: Bacilli
- Order: Lactobacillales
- Family: Lactobacillaceae
- Genus: Weissella
- Species: W. thailandensis

Binomial name
- Weissella thailandensis Tanasupawat et al. 2000

Synonyms
- Weissella jogaejeotgali Lee et al. 2015

Species of bacterium

Weissella thailandensis is a species of Gram-positive bacteria. It is a homofermentative, sphere-shaped lactic acid bacteria. Its type strain is FS61-1^{T} (= PCU 210^{T} = NRIC 0298^{T} = HSCC 1412^{T} = JCM 10695^{T} = TISTR 1384^{T}). Its genome has been sequenced.
