= Staphylococcus vitulinus =

Scientific classification
- Domain: Bacteria
- Kingdom: Bacillati
- Phylum: Bacillota
- Class: Bacilli
- Order: Caryophanales
- Family: Staphylococcaceae
- Genus: Staphylococcus
- Species: S. vitulinus

Binomial name
- Staphylococcus vitulinus Webster et al. 1994

Species of bacterium

Staphylococcus vitulinus is a Gram-positive, coagulase-negative member of the bacterial genus Staphylococcus consisting of clustered cocci. The species was originally isolated from food sources such as beef, chicken, lamb, and other meats, as well as animals including mammals like horses, voles, and whales. Initially named Staphylococcus vitulus, the name was later corrected to Staphylococcus vitulinus to adhere to proper Latin grammar.

The species Staphylococcus pulvereri, originally isolated from humans and from a diseased chicken carcass, was later determined to be synonymous with S. vitulinus.
