= Kocuria varians =

Scientific classification
- Domain: Bacteria
- Kingdom: Bacillati
- Phylum: Actinomycetota
- Class: Actinomycetes
- Order: Micrococcales
- Family: Micrococcaceae
- Genus: Kocuria
- Species: K. varians

Binomial name
- Kocuria varians (Migula 1900) Stackebrandt et al. 1995

Type strain
- ATCC 15306; CCM 884; CCUG 35392; CIP 81.73; DSM 20033; HAMBI 1951; HAMBI 40; IEGM 400; IFO 15358; JCM 7238; LMG 14231; NBRC 15358; NCTC 7564; VKM B-1827

Synonyms
- Micrococcus varians Migula 1900 (Approved Lists 1980)

Species of bacterium

Kocuria varians is a gram-positive species of bacteria in the genus Kocuria. It has been isolated from milk, meat, skin, soil, and beach sand. It is 0.9 to 1.5 micrometers in diameter, and occurs in clusters, which can be up to 4 millimeters in diameter and are yellow. It is known to cause ocular infections, brain abscesses, and endophthalmitis.
