= Weissella koreensis =

Scientific classification
- Domain: Bacteria
- Kingdom: Bacillati
- Phylum: Bacillota
- Class: Bacilli
- Order: Lactobacillales
- Family: Lactobacillaceae
- Genus: Weissella
- Species: W. koreensis

Binomial name
- Weissella koreensis Lee et al., 2002

Species of bacterium

Weissella koreensis is a species of Gram-positive bacteria in the family Leuconostocaceae. The bacteria has irregular cells, is tolerant of acid, and does not develop spores. It was described by Lee et al. in 2002.
