= Aspergillus acidus =

Scientific classification
- Kingdom: Fungi
- Division: Ascomycota
- Class: Eurotiomycetes
- Order: Eurotiales
- Family: Aspergillaceae
- Genus: Aspergillus
- Species: A. acidus

Binomial name
- Aspergillus acidus Kozakiewicz, Z. 1989

Synonyms
- Aspergillus foetidus var. pallidus Aspergillus foetidus var. acidus

Species of fungus

Aspergillus acidus is a species of fungus in the genus Aspergillus. Aspergillus acidus can be used in food fermentation for tea.
