= Leuconostoc pseudomesenteroides =

Scientific classification
- Domain: Bacteria
- Kingdom: Bacillati
- Phylum: Bacillota
- Class: Bacilli
- Order: Lactobacillales
- Family: Lactobacillaceae
- Genus: Leuconostoc
- Species: L. pseudomesenteroides

Binomial name
- Leuconostoc pseudomesenteroides Farrow et al. 1989

Species of bacterium

Leuconostoc pseudomesenteroides is an intrinsically vancomycin-resistant, Gram-positive, coccus-shaped bacterium, with type strain NCDO 768.
