= Lactiplantibacillus plantarum =

Scientific classification
- Domain: Bacteria
- Kingdom: Bacillati
- Phylum: Bacillota
- Class: Bacilli
- Order: Lactobacillales
- Family: Lactobacillaceae
- Genus: Lactiplantibacillus
- Species: L. plantarum

Binomial name
- Lactiplantibacillus plantarum (Orla-Jensen 1919) Zheng et al. 2020

Synonyms
- "Streptobacterium plantarum" Orla-Jensen 1919; Lactobacillus plantarum (Orla-Jensen 1919) Bergey et al. 1923 (Approved Lists 1980); Lactobacillus arizonensis Swezey et al. 2000

Species of bacterium

Lactiplantibacillus plantarum (formerly Lactobacillus arabinosus and Lactobacillus plantarum) is a widespread member of the genus Lactiplantibacillus and commonly found in many fermented food products as well as anaerobic plant matter. L. plantarum was first isolated from saliva. Based on its ability to temporarily persist in plants, the insect intestine and in the intestinal tract of vertebrate animals, it was designated as a nomadic organism. L. plantarum is Gram positive, bacilli shaped bacterium. L. plantarum cells are rods with rounded ends, straight, generally 0.9–1.2 μm wide and 3–8 μm long, occurring singly, in pairs or in short chains. L. plantarum has one of the largest genomes known among the lactic acid bacteria and is a very flexible and versatile species. It is estimated to grow between pH 3.4 and 8.8. Lactiplantibacillus plantarum can grow in the temperature range 12 °C to 40 °C. The viable counts of L. plantarum stored at refrigerated condition (4 °C) remained high, while a considerable reduction in the counts was observed stored at room temperature (25 ± 1 °C).

== Metabolism ==
Lactiplantibacillus plantarum are homofermentative, aerotolerant Gram-positive bacteria that grow at 15 °C (59 °F), but not at 45 °C (113 °F), and produce both enantiomers of lactic acid (D and L). Many lactobacilli including L. plantarum are unusual in that they can respire oxygen and express cytochromes if heme and menaquinone are present in the growth medium. In the absence of heme and menaquinone, oxygen is consumed by NADH peroxidase with hydrogen peroxide as intermediate and water as end product. The peroxide, it is presumed, acts as a weapon to exclude competing bacteria from the food source. In place of the protective enzyme superoxide dismutase present in almost all other oxygen-tolerant cells, this organism accumulates millimolar quantities of manganese polyphosphate. Manganese is also used by L. plantarum in a pseudo-catalase to lower reactive oxygen levels. Because the chemistry by which manganese complexes protect the cells from oxygen damage is subverted by iron, these cells contain virtually no iron atoms; in contrast, a cell of Escherichia coli of comparable volume contains over one-million iron atoms. Because of this, L. plantarum cannot be used to create active enzymes that require a heme complex, such as true catalases.

L. plantarum can also reduce insoluble terminal electron acceptors, such as iron oxides or solid electrodes through extracellular electron transfer when riboflavin and quinone (such as 1 4-dihydroxy-2-naphthoic acid, DHNA) are present. L. plantarum uses extracellular electron transfer to increase the NAD^{+}/NADH ratio, accelerate fermentation, generate more ATP through the substrate-level phosphorylation, and accumulate more biomass.

Lactiplantibacillus plantarum, like many lactobacilli, can be cultured using MRS media.

== Genomes ==
The genome sequencing of the lactic acid bacterium L. plantarum WCFS1 shows more molecular details. The chromosome contains 3,308,274 base pairs (GenBank: AL935263.1). The GC content of L. plantarum is 44.45% with the average protein count 3063. According to the experiment from Wageningen Centre for Food Sciences, the rRNA number of L. plantarum WCFS1 is 15, and the number or tRNA is 70.

== Products ==
=== Silage ===
Lactiplantibacillus plantarum is the most common bacterium used in silage inoculants. During the anaerobic conditions of ensilage, these organisms quickly dominate the microbial population, and, within 48 hours, they begin to produce lactic and acetic acids via the Embden-Meyerhof Pathway, further diminishing their competition. Under these conditions, L. plantarum strains producing high levels of heterologous proteins have been found to remain highly competitive. This quality could allow this species to be utilized as an effective biological pretreatment for lignocellulosic biomass.

=== Food products ===
Lactiplantibacillus plantarum is commonly found in milk products, meat and a lot of vegetable fermentations including sauerkraut, pickles, brined olives, kimchi, Ogi, sourdough, tempoyak, and other fermented plant material, and also some cheeses, fermented sausages, and stockfish. The high levels of this organism in food also makes it an ideal candidate for the development of probiotics. In a 2008 study by Juana Frias et al., L. plantarum was applied to reduce the allergenicity of soy flour. The result showed that, compared to other microbes, L. plantarum-fermented soy flour showed the highest reduction in IgE immunoreactivity (96–99%), depending upon the sensitivity of the plasma used. L. plantarum is also found in dadiah, a traditional fermented buffalo milk of the Minangkabau people, native to Sumatra.

Lactobacillus plantarum strain K21 is a gram-positive bacteria isolated from fermented vegetables. It has the ability to hydrolyze bile salt when it is provided as a supplement. In fat mice, K21 also reduces the levels of cholesterol and triglyceride, and inhibits the accumulation of lipid in 3T3-L1 preadipocytes. Furthermore, it reduces the level of plasma leptin, mitigates liver damage and alleviates glucose intolerance. Finally K21 inhibits body weight gain and fat mass accumulation.

=== Therapeutics ===
Because it is abundant, of human origin, and easy to grow, L. plantarum has been tested for health effects. It has been identified as a probiotic, which suggests its value for further research and application. L. plantarum has significant antioxidant activities and also helps to maintain intestinal permeability. It is able to suppress the growth of gas-producing bacteria in the intestines and may benefit some patients who suffer from IBS. It helps to create microbe balance and stabilize digestive enzyme patterns. Lactiplantibacillus plantarum has been found in experiments to increase hippocampal brain derived neurotrophic factor, which means L. plantarum may have a beneficial role in the treatment of depression. The ability of L. plantarum to survive in the human gastro-intestinal tract makes it a possible in vivo delivery vehicle for therapeutic compounds or proteins.

Lactiplantibacillus plantarum is a constituent in VSL#3. This proprietary, standardized formulation of live bacteria may be used in combination with conventional therapies to treat ulcerative colitis and requires a prescription.

=== Antimicrobial property ===
The ability of L. plantarum to produce antimicrobial substances helps them survive in the gastrointestinal tract of humans. The antimicrobial substances produced have shown significant effect on Gram-positive and Gram-negative bacteria.

=== Activity against AIDS-associated gut damage ===
As a result of initial HIV infection, the gut has been found to be a prime center of immune activity. The immune systems' Paneth cells of the gut attack HIV by producing interleukin 1 beta (IL-1β), which results in extensive collateral damage—sloughing of tight intestinal lining, witnessed as severe diarrhea. This destruction of the gut lining allows fungal pathogens to invade, e.g., Cryptococcus species, resulting in an AIDS-defining illness such as cryptococcosis, representing 60% to 70% of all AIDS-defining cases, but not necessarily only the gut. In rhesus macaques, L. plantarum is able to reduce (destroy) IL-1β, resolving inflammation, and accelerating gut repair within hours.

== Biochemistry ==
The entire genome has recently been sequenced, and promoter libraries have been developed for both conditional and constitutive gene expression, adding to the utility of L. plantarum. It is also commonly employed as the indicative organism in niacin bioassay experiments, in particular, AOAC International Official Method 944.13, as it is a niacin auxotroph.

== See also ==
- Microbial food cultures
- Lactiplantibacillus plantarum strain PS128
