= Gluconacetobacter azotocaptans =

Scientific classification
- Domain: Bacteria
- Kingdom: Pseudomonadati
- Phylum: Pseudomonadota
- Class: Alphaproteobacteria
- Order: Rhodospirillales
- Family: Acetobacteraceae
- Genus: Gluconacetobacter
- Species: G. azotocaptans

Binomial name
- Gluconacetobacter azotocaptans Fuentes-Ramírez et al. 2001

Species of bacterium

Gluconacetobacter azotocaptans is a species of acetic acid bacteria first isolated from rhizospheres and rhizoplanes of coffee plants. Its type strain is CFN-Ca54^{T} (= ATCC 70098S^{T} = DSM 13594^{T}).
