= Gluconacetobacter johannae =

Scientific classification
- Domain: Bacteria
- Kingdom: Pseudomonadati
- Phylum: Pseudomonadota
- Class: Alphaproteobacteria
- Order: Rhodospirillales
- Family: Acetobacteraceae
- Genus: Gluconacetobacter
- Species: G. johannae

Binomial name
- Gluconacetobacter johannae Fuentes-Ramírez et al. 2001

Species of bacterium

Gluconacetobacter johannae is a species of acetic acid bacteria first isolated from rhizospheres and rhizoplanes of coffee plants. Its type strain is CFN-Cf55^{T} (= ATCC 700987^{T} = DSM 13595^{T}).
