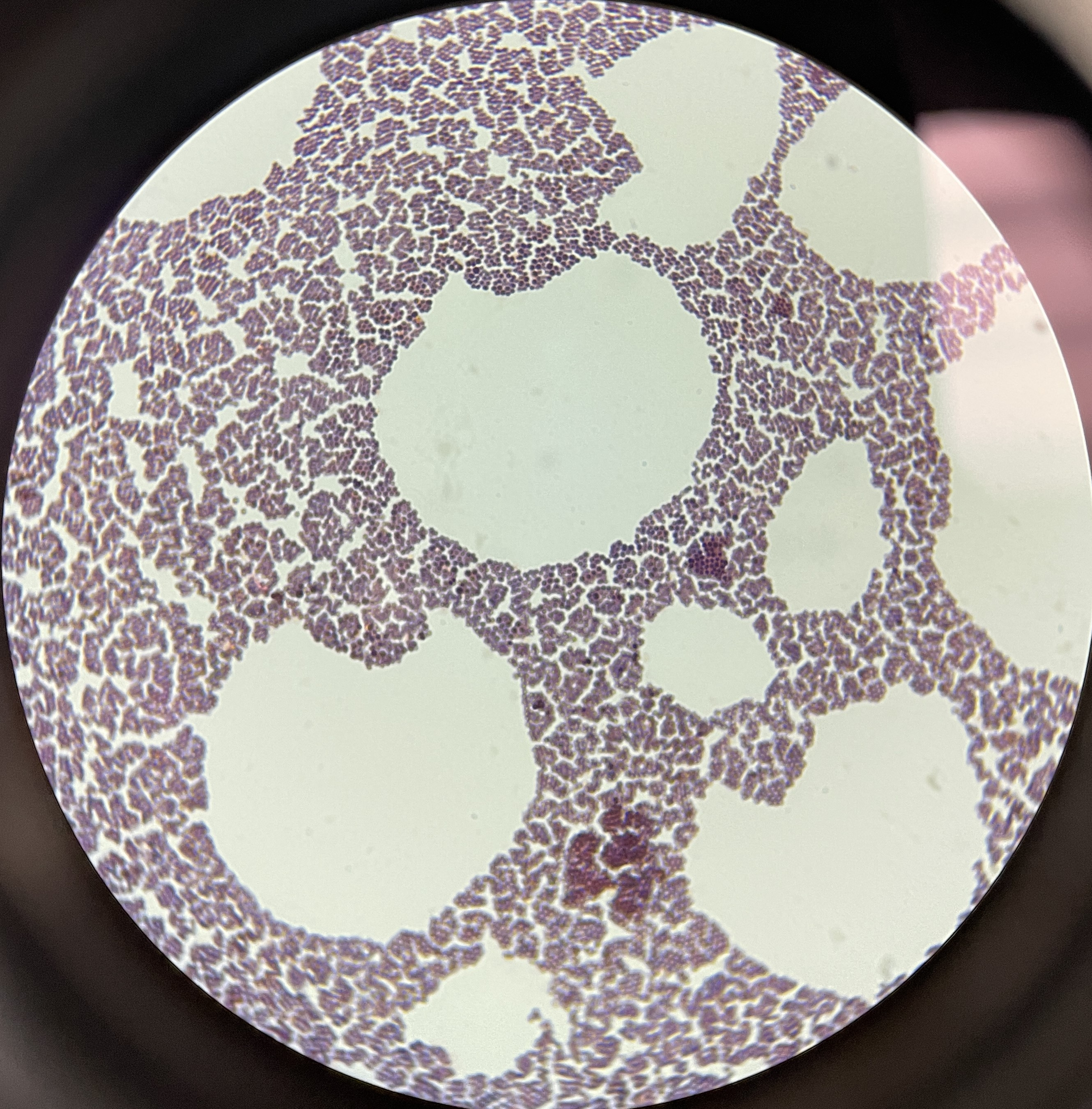
- 1000x magnification of a Gram-stained sample of Staphylococcus xylosus

Scientific classification
- Domain: Bacteria
- Kingdom: Bacillati
- Phylum: Bacillota
- Class: Bacilli
- Order: Bacillales
- Family: Staphylococcaceae
- Genus: Staphylococcus
- Species: S. xylosus

Binomial name
- Staphylococcus xylosus Schleifer & Kloos 1975

= Staphylococcus xylosus =

Species of bacterium

Staphylococcus xylosus is a species of bacteria belonging to the genus Staphylococcus. It is a Gram-positive bacterium that forms clusters of cells. Like most staphylococcal species, it is coagulase-negative and exists as a commensal on the skin of humans and animals and in the environment.

Staphylococcus xylosus may be used as CNC (coagulase-negative cocci) in salami fermentation.

It appears to be far more common in animals than in humans. S. xylosus has very occasionally been identified as a cause of human infection, but in some cases it may have been misidentified.

== Identification ==
Staphylococcus xylosus is normally sensitive to fleroxacin, methicillin, penicillin, teicoplanin, erythromycin and tetracycline, and resistant to novobiocin. It is highly active biochemically, producing acid from a wide variety of carbohydrates.

Acid and gas are produced from D-(+)-galactose, D-(+)-mannose, D-(+)-mannitol, maltose, and lactose. Caseinolytic and gelatinase activities are normally present.

It normally produces slime but not capsules. This ability is lost upon subculture. Its cell wall peptidoglycan is similar to the L-Lys-Gly3-5 L-Ser0.6-1.5 type found in predominantly human species.

== Clinical importance ==
Staphylococcus xylosus is a member of the skin flora of humans and other animals. It has been associated with:

- Nasal dermatitis in gerbils
- Pyelonephritis in humans
- Avian staphylococcosis
- Bovine intramammary infection

It is also found in milk, cheese, and sausage.
