= Acetobacter malorum =

Scientific classification
- Domain: Bacteria
- Kingdom: Pseudomonadati
- Phylum: Pseudomonadota
- Class: Alphaproteobacteria
- Order: Rhodospirillales
- Family: Acetobacteraceae
- Genus: Acetobacter
- Species: A. malorum

Binomial name
- Acetobacter malorum Cleenwerck et al. 2002

Species of bacterium

Acetobacter malorum is a bacterium. Its type strain is LMG 1746^{T} (= DSM 14337^{T}).
