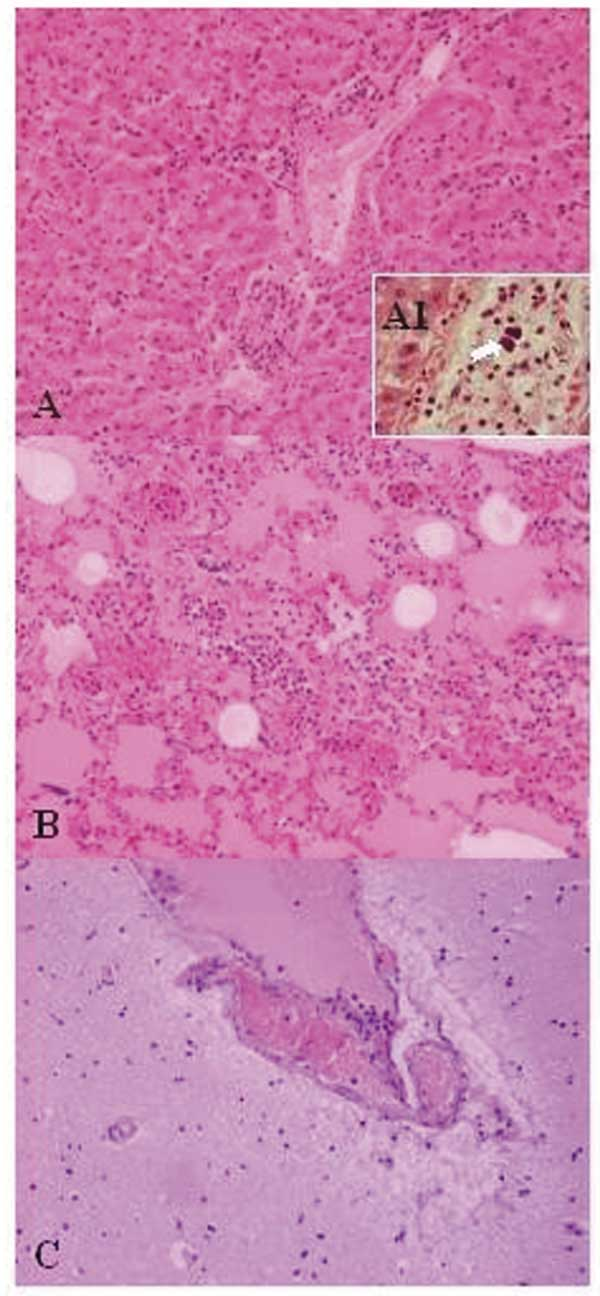
- Lesions of Weissella confusa in the mona monkey (hematoxylin and eosin stain): A) liver: portal triads with neutrophilic infiltration (x10); A1, presence of bacterial emboli inside the vein (arrow) (x40). B) acute pneumonia: edema, congestion, and leukocyte cells exudation in the pulmonary alveoli (x10). C) encephalitis: congestion and marginalized neutrophils in nervous vessels (x10)

Scientific classification
- Domain: Bacteria
- Kingdom: Bacillati
- Phylum: Bacillota
- Class: Bacilli
- Order: Lactobacillales
- Family: Lactobacillaceae
- Genus: Weissella; Collins et al. 1994

Type species
- Weissella viridescens (Niven and Evans 1957) Collins et al. 1994

= Weissella =

Genus of bacteria

Weissella is a genus of gram-positive bacteria placed within the family Lactobacillaceae, formerly considered species of the Leuconostoc paramesenteroides group. The morphology of Weissella species varies from spherical or lenticular cells to irregular rods. Several strains of Weissella cibaria and Weissella confusa have shown probiotic potential. In particular, the cell-free culture supernatant of Weissella confusa shows a number of beneficial characteristics, such as antibacterial potential and anti-inflammatory efficiency. However, several strains of W. confusa are opportunistic bacteria. A number of studies have been done on the safety of the bacterial species, indicating their probiotic potential. The Senate Commission on Food Safety has validated the use of W. confusa in food.

== Species ==
The genus Weissella comprises the following species:

- Weissella bombi Praet et al. 2015
- Weissella ceti Vela et al. 2011
- Weissella cibaria Björkroth et al. 2002
- Weissella coleopterorum Hyun et al. 2021
- Weissella confusa corrig. (Holzapfel and Kandler 1969) Collins et al. 1994
- Weissella diestrammenae Oh et al. 2013
- Weissella fangxianensis Xiang et al. 2023
- Weissella halotolerans (Kandler et al. 1983) Collins et al. 1994
- Weissella hellenica Collins et al. 1994
- Weissella kandleri (Holzapfel and van Wyk 1983) Collins et al. 1994
- Weissella koreensis Lee et al. 2002
- Weissella minor (Kandler et al. 1983) Collins et al. 1994
- Weissella muntiaci Lin et al. 2020
- Weissella oryzae Tohno et al. 2013
- Weissella paramesenteroides (Garvie 1967) Collins et al. 1994
- Weissella sagaensis Li et al. 2020
- Weissella soli Magnusson et al. 2002
- Weissella thailandensis Tanasupawat et al. 2000
- Weissella uvarum Nisiotou et al. 2014
- Weissella viridescens (Niven and Evans 1957) Collins et al. 1994

== Phylogeny ==
The currently accepted (2021) taxonomy is based on the List of Prokaryotic names with Standing in Nomenclature and the phylogeny is based on whole-genome sequences.

- - Weissella
    - - - - - Weissella hellenica
            - - Weissella thailandensis
              - Weissella paramesenteroides
          - - Weissella confusa
            - Weissella cibaria
        - - - Weissella minor
            - Weissella viridescens
          - - Weissella ceti
            - Weissella halotolerans
      - Weissella oryzae
    - - - Weissella kandleri
        - Weissella koreensis
      - Weissella soli
  - outgroup
    Oenococcus
