= Dermabacteraceae =

Scientific classification
- Domain: Bacteria
- Kingdom: Bacillati
- Phylum: Actinomycetota
- Class: Actinomycetes
- Order: Micrococcales
- Family: Dermabacteraceae; Stackebrandt et al. 1997

Type genus
- Dermabacter Jones and Collins 1989

Genera
- Brachybacterium Collins et al. 1988; Dermabacter Jones and Collins 1989; Devriesea Martel et al. 2008; Helcobacillus Renvoise et al. 2009

Family of bacteria

Dermabacteraceae is family of bacteria in the phylum Actinomycetota.

== Phylogeny ==
The currently accepted taxonomy is based on the List of Prokaryotic names with Standing in Nomenclature and the phylogeny is based on whole-genome sequences. (Note: Helcobacillus is not included in this phylogenetic tree.)

- - Dermabacteraceae
    - Dermabacter
    - - Devriesea
      - Brachybacterium
  - outgroups
    - Brevibacteriaceae
    - Micrococcaceae
