= Microbacterium aerolatum =

Scientific classification
- Domain: Bacteria
- Kingdom: Bacillati
- Phylum: Actinomycetota
- Class: Actinomycetia
- Order: Micrococcales
- Family: Microbacteriaceae
- Genus: Microbacterium
- Species: M. aerolatum

Binomial name
- Microbacterium aerolatum Zlamala et al. 2002

Type strain
- CCM 4955; DSM 14217; JCM 12137; NBRC 103071; V-73

Species of bacterium

Microbacterium aerolatum is a rod shaped and gram positive bacteria that was found in the Vergilius Chapel (Virgilkapelle) of Vienna, Austria. This bacterium "shared the highest 16S rDNA sequence similarities with members of the genus Microbacterium, in particular Microbacterium foliorum, Microbacterium testaceum, Microbacterium esteraromaticum, Microbacterium keratanolyticum and Microbacterium arabinogalactanolyticum."
