= Microbacterium humi =

Scientific classification
- Domain: Bacteria
- Kingdom: Bacillati
- Phylum: Actinomycetota
- Class: Actinomycetia
- Order: Micrococcales
- Family: Microbacteriaceae
- Genus: Microbacterium
- Species: M. humi

Binomial name
- Microbacterium humi Young et al. 2010

Type strain
- CC-12309; CCM 7687; DSM 21799

Species of bacterium

Microbacterium humi is a Gram-positive and rod-shaped bacterium from the genus Microbacterium which has been isolated from the fungus Agaricus blazei in Taiwan.
