= Microbacterium pseudoresistens =

Scientific classification
- Domain: Bacteria
- Kingdom: Bacillati
- Phylum: Actinomycetota
- Class: Actinomycetia
- Order: Micrococcales
- Family: Microbacteriaceae
- Genus: Microbacterium
- Species: M. pseudoresistens

Binomial name
- Microbacterium pseudoresistens Young et al. 2010

Type strain
- CC-5209; CCM 7688; DSM 22185

Species of bacterium

Microbacterium pseudoresistens is a Gram-positive and rod-shaped bacterium from the genus Microbacterium which has been isolated from the fungus Agaricus blazei in Taiwan.
