= Blazein =

Names
- IUPAC name (22E)-6β-Methoxy-5α-ergosta-7,22-diene-3β,5-diol
- Systematic IUPAC name (1R,3aR,5R,5aR,7S,9aR,9bS,11aR)-1-[(2R,3E,5R)-5,6-Dimethylhept-3-en-2-yl]-5-methoxy-9a,11a-dimethyl-1,2,3,3a,5,6,7,8,9,9a,9b,10,11,11a-tetradecahydro-5aH-cyclopenta[a]phenanthrene-5a,7-diol

Identifiers
CAS Number	126060-09-1
3D model (JSmol)	Interactive image
ChEBI	CHEBI:68081
ChemSpider	29215786
PubChem CID	14159790
CompTox Dashboard (EPA)	DTXSID601045592
- InChI: InChI=1S/C29H48O3/c1-18(2)19(3)8-9-20(4)23-10-11-24-22-16-26(32-7)29(31)17-21(30)12-15-28(29,6)25(22)13-14-27(23,24)5/h8-9,16,18-21,23-26,30-31H,10-15,17H2,1-7H3/b9-8+/t19-,20+,21-,23+,24-,25-,26+,27+,28+,29-/m0/s1 Key: GQVCGTRDXSDAHC-KNXFMRPFSA-N
- SMILES: CO[C@@H]1C=C2[C@H](CC[C@@]3(C)[C@H]2CC[C@@H]3[C@H](C)/C=C/[C@H](C)C(C)C)[C@@]2(C)CC[C@H](O)C[C@]12O

Properties
Chemical formula	C_{29}H_{48}O_{3}
Molar mass	444.690
- Except where otherwise noted, data are given for materials in their standard state (at 25 °C [77 °F], 100 kPa). Infobox references

Blazein is a bio-active steroid made by Agaricus blazei.
