= Microbacterium agarici =

Scientific classification
- Domain: Bacteria
- Kingdom: Bacillati
- Phylum: Actinomycetota
- Class: Actinomycetia
- Order: Micrococcales
- Family: Microbacteriaceae
- Genus: Microbacterium
- Species: M. agarici

Binomial name
- Microbacterium agarici Young et al. 2010

Type strain
- CC-SBCK-209; CCM 7686; DSM 21798

Species of bacterium

Microbacterium agarici is a Gram-positive and rod-shaped bacterium from the genus Microbacterium which has been isolated from the mushroom Agaricus blazei in Taiwan.
