= Agaricicola =

Scientific classification
- Domain: Bacteria
- Kingdom: Pseudomonadati
- Phylum: Pseudomonadota
- Class: Alphaproteobacteria
- Order: Rhodobacterales
- Family: Rhodobacteraceae
- Genus: Agaricicola; Chu et al. 2010

Type species
- A. taiwanensis

Genus of bacteria

Agaricicola is a genus in the phylum Pseudomonadota (Bacteria).

== Etymology ==
The name Agaricicola derives from:
Neo-Latin noun Agaricus, generic name of a mushroom; Latin suff. -cola (from Latin masculine gender or feminine gender noun incola), dweller; Neo-Latin masculine gender noun Agaricicola, Agaricus-dweller, reflecting isolation of the first strain from Agaricus blazei (Murrill).

== Species ==
The genus contains a single species, namely A. taiwanensis (Chu et al. 2010), (Type species of the genus).; Neo-Latin masculine gender adjective taiwanensis, pertaining to Taiwan, where the type strain was isolated.)

== See also ==
- Bacterial taxonomy
- Microbiology
