= Agricultural microbiology =

Agricultural microbiology is a branch of microbiology dealing with plant-associated microbes and plant and animal diseases. It also deals with the microbiology of soil fertility, such as microbial degradation of organic matter and soil nutrient transformations. The primary goal of agricultural microbiology is to comprehensively explore the interactions between beneficial microorganisms like bacteria and fungi with crops. It also deals with the microbiology of soil fertility, such as microbial degradation of organic matter and soil nutrient transformations.

== Soil microorganisms ==
=== Importance of soil microorganisms ===
- Involved in nutrient transformation process
- Decomposition of resistant components of plant and animal tissue
- Role in microbial antagonism

=== Microorganisms as biofertilizers ===
Biofertilizers are seen as promising, sustainable alternatives to harmful chemical fertilizers due to their ability to increase yield and soil fertility through enhancing crop immunity and development. When applied to the soil, plant, or seed these biofertilizers colonize the rhizosphere or interior of the plant root. Once the microbial community is established, these microorganisms can help to solubilize and break down essential nutrients in the environment which would otherwise be unavailable or difficult for the crop to incorporate into biomass.

==== Nitrogen ====
Nitrogen is an essential element needed for the creation of biomass and is usually seen as a limiting nutrient in agricultural systems. Though abundant in the atmosphere, the atmospheric form of nitrogen cannot be utilized by plants and must be transformed into a form that can be taken up directly by the plants; this problem is solved by biological nitrogen fixers. Nitrogen fixing bacteria, also known as diazotrophs, can be broken down into three groups: free-living (ex. Azotobacter, Anabaena, and Clostridium), symbiotic (ex. Rhizobium and Trichodesmium) and associative symbiotic (ex. Azospirillum). These organisms have the ability to fix atmospheric nitrogen to bioavailable forms that can be taken up by plants and incorporated into biomass. An important nitrogen fixing symbiosis is that between Rhizobium and leguminous plants. Rhizobium have been shown to contribute upwards of 300 kg N/ha/year in different leguminous plants, and their application to agricultural crops has been shown to increase crop height, seed germination, and nitrogen content within the plant. The use of nitrogen fixing bacteria in agriculture could help reduce the reliance on man-made nitrogen fertilizers that are synthesized via the Haber-Bosch process.

==== Phosphorus ====
Phosphorus can be made available to plants via solubilization or mobilization by bacteria or fungi. Under most soil conditions, phosphorus is the least mobile nutrient in the environment and therefore must be converted to solubilized forms in order to be available for plant uptake. Phosphate solubilization is the process by which organic acids are secreted into the environment, this lowers the pH and dissolves phosphate bonds therefore leaving the phosphate solubilized. Phosphate-solubilizing bacteria (PBS) (ex. Bacillus subtilis and Bacillus circulans) are responsible for upwards of 50% of microbial phosphate solubilization. In addition to the solubilized phosphate, PBS can also provide trace elements such as iron and zinc which further enhance plant growth. Fungi (ex. Aspergillus awamori and Penicillium spp.) also perform this process, however their contribution is less than 1% of all activity. A 2019 study showed that when crops were inoculated with Aspergillus niger , there was a significant increase fruit size and yield compared with non-inoculated crops; when the crop was co-inoculated with A. niger and the nitrogen fixing bacteria Azobacter, the crop performance was better than with inoculation using only one of the biofertilizer and the crops that were not inoculated at all. Phosphorus mobilization is the process of transferring phosphorus to the root from the soil; this process is carried out via mycorrhiza (ex. Arbuscular mycorrhiza) . Arbuscular mycorrhiza mobilize phosphate by penetrating and increasing the surface area of the roots which helps to mobilize phosphorus into the plant. Phosphate solubilizing and mobilizing microorganisms can contribute upwards of 30–50 kg P_{2}O_{5}/ha which, in turn, has the potential to increase crop yield by 10–20%.

== Example ==
- DAP
- UREA
- SUPER PHOSPHATE

== Microbiology in Sustainable Agriculture ==
=== Effective Microorganisms ===
Effective microorganisms (EM) are essential to the development of sustainable agriculture and consist of a diverse, mixed culture of microorganisms that is naturally occurring in nature. Biopreparations containing effective microorganisms play a crucial role across various sectors, such as environmental protection, food production, and medicine. Furthermore, this application of effective microorganism biotechnology spans a range of agricultural areas, including soil rejuvenation, crop cultivation, livestock farming, and food preservation. These biopreparations prove particularly beneficial for land preparation and field preparation. Effective microorganisms can be applied to crops during the growing season or directly to the soil during preparation, enhancing both soil health and promoting plant growth. The broad utility of effective microorganisms stems from their high enzymatic specificity, allowing them to thrive in various conditions. Moreover, effective microorganism technology is now utilized in more than 140 countries worldwide, with Brazil being the leading adopter. The widespread usage of effective microorganisms displays the power to enhance the agricultural industry and environmentally sustainable farming.

=== Effective Microorganisms in Sustainable Agriculture ===
Conventional farming methods use chemical fertilizers, pesticides, and herbicides to safeguard crops from pests and diseases. However, these chemical agents have adverse environmental impacts, contributing to environmental pollution. The use of agricultural chemicals has been linked to the decline of plant and animal species, as well as harm to soil biodiversity, including bacterial and fungal communities. Chemical plant protection products can alter agricultural soils by affecting their physical properties such as texture, permeability, and porosity. Additionally, these products disrupt the nutrient cycles of phosphorus and nitrogen and reduce the diversity of the soil microbiome. Given the challenges posed by a growing global population and the need for more and higher-quality food, the future of agriculture lies in using effective microorganisms to boost yields. This approach offers a sustainable alternative to traditional chemical methods, fostering environmental health and agricultural resilience.

Successful crop production hinges on the health of the soil, which is influenced by a network of biological, chemical, and physical processes driven by microorganisms. Effective microorganisms enhance the soil's beneficial microbial community, paving the way for sustainable agriculture. These microorganisms consist of naturally occurring microbes, such as photosynthesizing bacteria, lactic acid bacteria, yeasts, and fermenting fungi, which can be applied to increase soil microbial diversity. The application of effective microorganisms improves soil structure and fertility while significantly boosting biological diversity. They can inhibit the proliferation of soil-borne pathogens, assist in nitrogen fixation, and enhance plant nutrient uptake. Effective microorganisms also accelerate the decomposition of organic waste, which promotes composting and, therefore, increases the availability of valuable minerals and bolsters the activities of indigenous microbes. By dominating the soil's microbial environment, effective microorganisms encourage other beneficial microbes to thrive and outcompete smaller groups of pathogenic or opportunistic microbes. This natural balancing act leads to stronger, more resilient plants and higher crop yields, positioning effective microorganisms as a key player in the future of sustainable agriculture.

== Factors Affecting Microorganisms in Agricultural Systems ==
=== Human Impacts ===
Organic farming methods, which are methods meant to sustain ecosystem health by limiting the use of external inputs like synthetic fertilizers and focusing on natural inputs, can have an effect of increasing the number of microbes in a system and increasing their ability to utilize carbon and nitrogen-based molecules. A method of maintaining ecosystem function in agricultural soils is using crop rotations, where increases in the number of crops used for a crop rotation in farming systems has also been shown to have the effect of increasing microbial diversity and the number of microbial species present. Relatedly, increases in microbial diversity have been shown to have beneficial effects on the health of plants and soils.

There are also agricultural practices that have negative impacts on microorganisms in agricultural systems. Another common farming practice, tillage, can have the immediate effect of decreasing carbon and nitrogen originating from microbial biomass. Conversely, no-till practices have been shown to be able to increase soil health, increase microbial growth, and increase microbial community functionality. However, the negative impacts of tillage are dependent on the intensity of tillage, and the microbial community has been shown to be able to recover over time. To limit the effects of insect behavior on crop growth and health, a common practice is the use of pesticides. These pesticides in turn affect soil microbes in ways such as altering the composition of the microbial community in soils for months after exposure. A type of pesticide, fungicides, have also been shown to have negative effects on microbes not being targeted by the chemical as well as causing changes in the community of microbes living associated with host plant roots.

=== Environmental Impacts ===
Climatic changes present themselves in many different ways, and these changes can also impact the microbial members of agricultural soils. Increasing temperatures have been shown to have an effect of limiting plant root growth and thereby reducing the ability of arbuscular mycorrhizal fungi (AMF) to grow associated with these roots. Changing temperatures can have the effect of increasing the abundance and ability of plant pathogens to produce negative impacts in agricultural ecosystems. Increased levels of carbon dioxide (CO_{2}), modify the interactions between plants and pathogens and can lead to changes in what plant pathogens are present and how they are able to negatively impact plants. However, there currently is a lack of information about how to predict how elevated levels of CO_{2} can change the interactions between plants and potential pathogens across many different plant-pathogen relationships.

There is currently a push to understand the role microbes in soils, including agricultural soils, play in limiting the negative impacts of climate change. For example, soil microbes are able to convert methane into carbon dioxide, thereby modulating greenhouse gas emissions. They also have a wide range of effects on agriculture including conversion of carbon dioxide into usable forms of carbon for plants, releasing chemicals to increase the ability of plants to uptake and store water, and protecting plants from drought.

== See also ==
- Veterinary medicine
