= Microbacterium nanhaiense =

Scientific classification
- Domain: Bacteria
- Kingdom: Bacillati
- Phylum: Actinomycetota
- Class: Actinomycetia
- Order: Micrococcales
- Family: Microbacteriaceae
- Genus: Microbacterium
- Species: M. nanhaiense

Binomial name
- Microbacterium nanhaiense Yan et al. 2015

Type strain
- CGMCC 4.7181; DSM 26811; KCTC 29185; OAct400

Species of bacterium

Microbacterium nanhaiense is a Gram-positive, heterotrophic, anaerobic, non-spore-forming, rod-shaped and non-motile bacterium from the genus Microbacterium which has been isolated from sea sediments from the South China Sea.
