= Microbacterium dextranolyticum =

Scientific classification
- Domain: Bacteria
- Kingdom: Bacillati
- Phylum: Actinomycetota
- Class: Actinomycetia
- Order: Micrococcales
- Family: Microbacteriaceae
- Genus: Microbacterium
- Species: M. dextranolyticum

Binomial name
- Microbacterium dextranolyticum Yokota et al. 1993

Type strain
- ATCC 51344; CCUG 38517; CIP 103993; DSM 8607; IFO 14592; JCM 9180; M-73; NBRC 14592; NRRL B-23242; VKM Ac-1940

Species of bacterium

Microbacterium dextranolyticum is a bacterium of the family Microbacteriaceae.
