= Microbacterium invictum =

Scientific classification
- Domain: Bacteria
- Kingdom: Bacillati
- Phylum: Actinomycetota
- Class: Actinomycetia
- Order: Micrococcales
- Family: Microbacteriaceae
- Genus: Microbacterium
- Species: M. invictum

Binomial name
- Microbacterium invictum Vaz-Moreira et al. 2009

Type strain
- CIP 110032; DC-200; DSM 19600; JCM 17023; LMG 24557

Species of bacterium

Microbacterium invictum is a Gram-positive and facultatively aerobic bacterium from the genus Microbacterium which has been isolated from compost in Portugal.
