= Microbacterium rhizomatis =

Scientific classification
- Domain: Bacteria
- Kingdom: Bacillati
- Phylum: Actinomycetota
- Class: Actinomycetia
- Order: Micrococcales
- Family: Microbacteriaceae
- Genus: Microbacterium
- Species: M. rhizomatis

Binomial name
- Microbacterium rhizomatis Hoang et al. 2015

Type strain
- JCM 30598; KCTC 39529; DCY100; DCY102

Species of bacterium

Microbacterium rhizomatis is a Gram-positive and rod-shaped bacterium from the genus Microbacterium which has been isolated from the rhizome of a ginseng root from the Hwacheon mountain in Korea. Microbacterium rhizomatis produces β-glucosidase.
