= Microbacterium awajiense =

Scientific classification
- Domain: Bacteria
- Kingdom: Bacillati
- Phylum: Actinomycetota
- Class: Actinomycetia
- Order: Micrococcales
- Family: Microbacteriaceae
- Genus: Microbacterium
- Species: M. awajiense

Binomial name
- Microbacterium awajiense Kageyama et al. 2008

Type strain
- DSM 18907; JCM 16544; MBIC08276; YM13-414

Species of bacterium

Microbacterium awajiense is a Gram-positive and non-motile bacterium from the genus Microbacterium which has been isolated from sand sediments from the Awaji Island on Japan.
