= Microbacterium xylanilyticum =

Scientific classification
- Domain: Bacteria
- Kingdom: Bacillati
- Phylum: Actinomycetota
- Class: Actinomycetia
- Order: Micrococcales
- Family: Microbacteriaceae
- Genus: Microbacterium
- Species: M. xylanilyticum

Binomial name
- Microbacterium xylanilyticum Kim et al. 2005

Type strain
- CIP 108944; DSM 16914; IAM 15299; JCM 13591; KCTC 19079; LMG 23366; S3-E T

Species of bacterium

Microbacterium xylanilyticum is a Gram-positive, non-spore-forming, xylan-degrading and non-motile bacterium from the genus Microbacterium which has been isolated from sludge in Cheongju in Korea.
