= Microbacterium radiodurans =

Scientific classification
- Domain: Bacteria
- Kingdom: Bacillati
- Phylum: Actinomycetota
- Class: Actinomycetia
- Order: Micrococcales
- Family: Microbacteriaceae
- Genus: Microbacterium
- Species: M. radiodurans

Binomial name
- Microbacterium radiodurans Zhang et al. 2010

Type strain
- CCTCC M208212; GIMN1.002; NRRL B-24799

Species of bacterium

Microbacterium radiodurans is a Gram-positive, heterotrophic and strictly aerobic bacterium from the genus Microbacterium which has been isolated from the Gobi Desert in China. Microbacterium radiodurans is resistant against UV radiation.
