= Microbacterium chocolatum =

Scientific classification
- Domain: Bacteria
- Kingdom: Bacillati
- Phylum: Actinomycetota
- Class: Actinomycetia
- Order: Micrococcales
- Family: Microbacteriaceae
- Genus: Microbacterium
- Species: M. chocolatum

Binomial name
- Microbacterium chocolatum Takeuchi and Hatano 1998

Type strain
- ATCC 7319; BUCSAV 207; CIP 105729; DSM 12507; DSMZ 12507; IAM 15199; IFO 3578; IFO 3758; JCM 12412; NBRC 3758; NCIB 8181; NCIMB 8181; NRRL B-24218; SneathD339; VKM Ac-2078

Species of bacterium

Microbacterium chocolatum is a bacterium from the genus Microbacterium.
