= Microbacterium oleivorans =

Scientific classification
- Domain: Bacteria
- Kingdom: Bacillati
- Phylum: Actinomycetota
- Class: Actinomycetia
- Order: Micrococcales
- Family: Microbacteriaceae
- Genus: Microbacterium
- Species: M. oleivorans

Binomial name
- Microbacterium oleivorans Schippers et al. 2005

Type strain
- BAS69; CIP 108712; DSM 16091; IAM 15236; JCM 14341; NBRC 103075; NCIMB 14003

Species of bacterium

Microbacterium oleivorans is a Gram-positive and crude-oil-degrading bacterium from the genus Microbacterium which has been isolated from an oil storage cavern in Germany.
