= Microbacterium profundi =

Scientific classification
- Domain: Bacteria
- Kingdom: Bacillati
- Phylum: Actinomycetota
- Class: Actinomycetia
- Order: Micrococcales
- Family: Microbacteriaceae
- Genus: Microbacterium
- Species: M. profundi

Binomial name
- Microbacterium profundi Wu et al. 2008

Type strain
- CGMCC 1.6777; JCM 14840; Shh49

Species of bacterium

Microbacterium profundi is a Gram-positive, neutrophilic, aerobic and rod-shaped bacterium from the genus Microbacterium which has been isolated from deep-sea sediments from the Pacific Ocean.
