= Microbacterium natoriense =

Scientific classification
- Domain: Bacteria
- Kingdom: Bacillati
- Phylum: Actinomycetota
- Class: Actinomycetes
- Order: Micrococcales
- Family: Microbacteriaceae
- Genus: Microbacterium
- Species: M. natoriense

Binomial name
- Microbacterium natoriense Liu et al. 2005

Type strain
- ATCC BAA-1032; CIP 108753; DSM 17277; JCM 12611; LMG 23573; TNJL143-2

Species of bacterium

Microbacterium natoriense is a Gram-positive and rod-shaped bacterium from the genus Microbacterium which has been isolated from soil from Natori in Japan. Microbacterium natoriense produces D-aminoacylase.

Microbacterium natoriense is a non-motile, non-spore-forming, aerobic species that grows optimally at 30 degrees celsius and within a pH range of 5-7. It is positive for catalase, pyrazinamidase, alkaline phosphatase, N-acetyl-β-glucosaminidase, and gelatinase, but negative for nitrate reduction, urease, pyrrolidonyl arylamidase, oxidation/fermentation, casein hydrolysis, and β-glucuronidase. The species tolerates up to 6% (w/v) NaCl in LB medium, but growth was not observed at NaCl concentrations of 7% or higher. Its cell-wall diamino acid is ornithine, and the major fatty acids are anteiso-C15:0 (45.0 mol%), iso-C15:0 (17.0 mol%), and anteiso-C17:0 (16.9 mol%). The genomic G+C content (guanine and cytosine percentage) is 69.1 mol%.
