= Microbacterium insulae =

Scientific classification
- Domain: Bacteria
- Kingdom: Bacillati
- Phylum: Actinomycetota
- Class: Actinomycetia
- Order: Micrococcales
- Family: Microbacteriaceae
- Genus: Microbacterium
- Species: M. insulae

Binomial name
- Microbacterium insulae Yoon et al. 2009

Type strain
- CCUG 54523; KCTC 19247; DS-66

Species of bacterium

Microbacterium insulae is a Gram-positive and non-motile bacterium from the genus Microbacterium which has been isolated from soil from Dokdo, Korea.
