= Microbacterium koreense =

Scientific classification
- Domain: Bacteria
- Kingdom: Bacillati
- Phylum: Actinomycetota
- Class: Actinomycetia
- Order: Micrococcales
- Family: Microbacteriaceae
- Genus: Microbacterium
- Species: M. koreense

Binomial name
- Microbacterium koreense Lee et al. 2006

Type strain
- 01-305; DSM 45576; KCTC 19819

Species of bacterium

Microbacterium koreense is a Gram-positive bacterium from the genus Microbacterium which has been isolated from seawater in Korea.
