= Microbacterium sorbitolivorans =

Scientific classification
- Domain: Bacteria
- Kingdom: Bacillati
- Phylum: Actinomycetota
- Class: Actinomycetia
- Order: Micrococcales
- Family: Microbacteriaceae
- Genus: Microbacterium
- Species: M. sorbitolivorans

Binomial name
- Microbacterium sorbitolivorans Meng et al. 2016

Type strain
- CGMCC 1.15228; DSM 103422; GZDIS-1-1; SZDIS-1-1

Species of bacterium

Microbacterium sorbitolivorans is a Gram-positive and facultatively anaerobic bacterium from the genus Microbacterium which has been isolated from a fermentation bed of a pigpen in Xiamen, China.
