= Microbacterium enclense =

Scientific classification
- Domain: Bacteria
- Kingdom: Bacillati
- Phylum: Actinomycetota
- Class: Actinomycetia
- Order: Micrococcales
- Family: Microbacteriaceae
- Genus: Microbacterium
- Species: M. enclense

Binomial name
- Microbacterium enclense Mawlankar et al. 2015

Type strain
- CCTCC AB 2011120; DSM 25125; NIO-02; NCIM 5454; NIO-1002

Species of bacterium

Microbacterium enclense is a Gram-positive, non-spore-forming and non-motile bacterium from the genus Microbacterium which has been isolated from marine sediments from the Chorao Island in India.
