= Microbacterium luticocti =

Scientific classification
- Domain: Bacteria
- Kingdom: Bacillati
- Phylum: Actinomycetota
- Class: Actinomycetes
- Order: Micrococcales
- Family: Microbacteriaceae
- Genus: Microbacterium
- Species: M. luticocti

Binomial name
- Microbacterium luticocti Vaz-Moreira et al. 2008

Type strain
- CCUG 54537; DSM 19459; JCM 15576; SC-087B

Species of bacterium

Microbacterium luticocti is a Gram-positive, short rod and motile bacterium from the genus Microbacterium which has been isolated from sewage sludge compost in Porto in Portugal.
