= Microbacterium pumilum =

Scientific classification
- Domain: Bacteria
- Kingdom: Bacillati
- Phylum: Actinomycetota
- Class: Actinomycetia
- Order: Micrococcales
- Family: Microbacteriaceae
- Genus: Microbacterium
- Species: M. pumilum

Binomial name
- Microbacterium pumilum Kageyama et al. 2006

Type strain
- CIP 109364; JCM 14902; KV-488; NBRC 101279; NRRL B-24452

Species of bacterium

Microbacterium pumilum is a Gram-positive and non-motile bacterium from the genus Microbacterium which has been isolated from soil from Japan.
