= Microbacterium fluvii =

Scientific classification
- Domain: Bacteria
- Kingdom: Bacillati
- Phylum: Actinomycetota
- Class: Actinomycetia
- Order: Micrococcales
- Family: Microbacteriaceae
- Genus: Microbacterium
- Species: M. fluvii

Binomial name
- Microbacterium fluvii Kageyama et al. 2008

Type strain
- DSM 18908; JCM 16545; MBIC08277; YSL3-15

Species of bacterium

Microbacterium fluvii is a Gram-positive bacterium from the genus Microbacterium which has been isolated from driftwood from the Maera River from Japan's Iriomote Island.
