= Microbacterium mangrovi =

Scientific classification
- Domain: Bacteria
- Kingdom: Bacillati
- Phylum: Actinomycetota
- Class: Actinomycetia
- Order: Micrococcales
- Family: Microbacteriaceae
- Genus: Microbacterium
- Species: M. mangrovi

Binomial name
- Microbacterium mangrovi Lee et al. 2014

Type strain
- DSM 28240; MCCC 1K00251; MUSC 115; NBRC 110089

Species of bacterium

Microbacterium mangrovi is a Gram-positive and non-spore-forming bacterium from the genus Microbacterium which has been isolated from mangrove soil from Tanjung Lumpur in Malaysia.
