= Microbacterium thalassium =

Scientific classification
- Domain: Bacteria
- Kingdom: Bacillati
- Phylum: Actinomycetota
- Class: Actinomycetes
- Order: Micrococcales
- Family: Microbacteriaceae
- Genus: Microbacterium
- Species: M. thalassium

Binomial name
- Microbacterium thalassium Takeuchi and Hatano 1998

Type strain
- CIP 105728; DSM 12511; DSMZ 12511; Hatano No. 10; IAM 15194; IFO 16060; JCM 12079; LMG 22183; NBRC 16060; NCIMB 13604; NRRL B-24222; VKM Ac-2084

Species of bacterium

Microbacterium thalassium is a bacterium from the genus of Microbacterium which has been isolated from the rhizosphere from mangrove trees on Japan.
