= Microbacterium panaciterrae =

Scientific classification
- Domain: Bacteria
- Kingdom: Bacillati
- Phylum: Actinomycetota
- Class: Actinomycetia
- Order: Micrococcales
- Family: Microbacteriaceae
- Genus: Microbacterium
- Species: M. panaciterrae

Binomial name
- Microbacterium panaciterrae Nguyen et al. 2015

Type strain
- JCM 17839; KCTC 19884; DCY56

Species of bacterium

Microbacterium panaciterrae is a Gram-positive, aerobic and non-motile bacterium from the genus Microbacterium which has been isolated from the rhizosphere of a ginseng plant in the Chungnam Province in Korea.
