= Microbacterium lacus =

Scientific classification
- Domain: Bacteria
- Kingdom: Bacillati
- Phylum: Actinomycetota
- Class: Actinomycetia
- Order: Micrococcales
- Family: Microbacteriaceae
- Genus: Microbacterium
- Species: M. lacus

Binomial name
- Microbacterium lacus Kageyama et al. 2008

Type strain
- A5E-52; DSM 18910; JCM 15575; MBIC08279

Species of bacterium

Microbacterium lacus is a bacterium from the genus Microbacterium which has been isolated from sediments from the Shinji lake from the Shimane Prefecture in Japan. Microbacterium lacus has the ability to degrade sulfadiazine.
