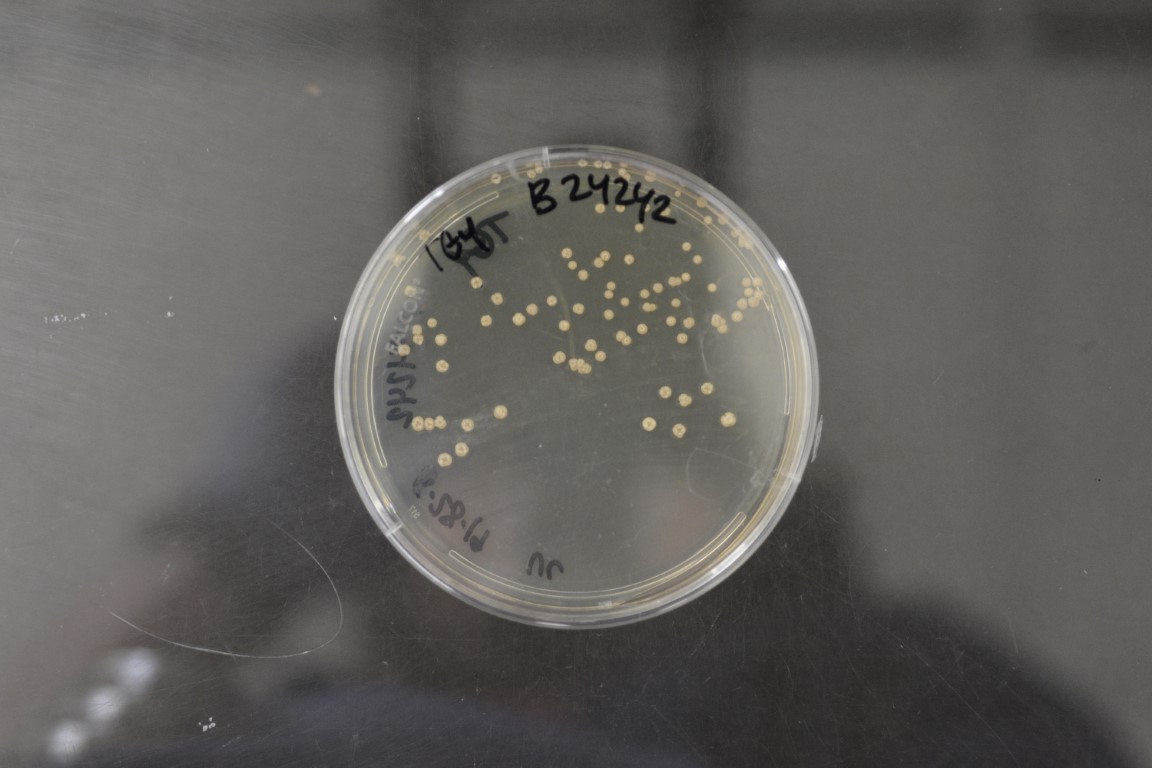
- Microbacterium gubbeenense on agar plate

Scientific classification
- Domain: Bacteria
- Kingdom: Bacillati
- Phylum: Actinomycetota
- Class: Actinomycetes
- Order: Micrococcales
- Family: Microbacteriaceae
- Genus: Microbacterium; Orla-Jensen 1919 (Approved Lists 1980)

Type species
- Microbacterium lacticum Orla-Jensen 1919 (Approved Lists 1980)

Species
- See text.

Synonyms
- Aureobacterium Collins et al. 1983

= Microbacterium =

Genus of bacteria

Microbacterium is a genus of bacteria in the family Microbacteriaceae. Microbacteria are common contaminants of laboratory reagents, which can lead to their being misrepresented in microbiome data.

== Species ==
Microbacterium comprises the following species:

- M. aerolatum Zlamala et al. 2002
- M. agarici Young et al. 2010
- M. albipurpureum ET2 Klementiev and Tsavkelova et al. 2026
- M. album Yang et al. 2018
- M. algeriense Lenchi et al. 2020
- M. amylolyticum Anand et al. 2012
- M. aoyamense Kageyama et al. 2006
- M. aquimaris Kim et al. 2008
- M. arabinogalactanolyticum (Yokota et al. 1993) Takeuchi and Hatano 1998
- M. arborescens (ex Frankland and Frankland 1889) Imai et al. 1985
- M. arthrosphaerae Kämpfer et al. 2011
- M. assamensis Kaur et al. 2011
- M. atlanticum Xie et al. 2022
- M. aurantiacum Takeuchi and Hatano 1998
- M. aureliae Kaur et al. 2016
- M. aurum Yokota et al. 1993
- M. awajiense Kageyama et al. 2008
- M. azadirachtae Madhaiyan et al. 2010
- M. barkeri (Collins et al. 1983) Takeuchi and Hatano 1998
- M. binotii Clermont et al. 2009
- M. bovistercoris Ling et al. 2019
- M. caowuchunii Tian et al. 2021
- M. chengjingii Zhou et al. 2021
- M. chocolatum Takeuchi and Hatano 1998
- M. cremeum Xie et al. 2022
- M. deminutum Kageyama et al. 2006
- M. deserti Yang et al. 2018
- M. dextranolyticum Yokota et al. 1993
- M. diaminobutyricum Fidalgo et al. 2016
- M. enclense Mawlankar et al. 2015
- M. endophyticum Alves et al. 2015
- M. esteraromaticum (Omelianski 1923) Takeuchi and Hatano 1998
- M. excoecariae Chen et al. 2020
- M. faecale Chen et al. 2016
- M. fandaimingii Zhou et al. 2021
- M. flavescens (Lochhead 1958) Takeuchi and Hatano 1998
- M. flavum Kageyama et al. 2008
- M. fluvii Kageyama et al. 2008
- M. foliorum Behrendt et al. 2001
- M. gilvum Chen et al. 2016
- M. ginsengisoli Park et al. 2008
- M. ginsengiterrae Kim et al. 2010
- M. gorillae Hadjadj et al. 2016
- M. gubbeenense Brennan et al. 2001
- M. halimionae Alves et al. 2015
- M. halophilum Takeuchi and Hatano 1998
- M. halophytorum Li et al. 2018
- M. halotolerans Li et al. 2005
- M. hatanonis Bakir et al. 2008
- M. helvum Li et al. 2021
- M. hibisci Yan et al. 2017
- M. hominis Takeuchi and Hatano 1998
- M. horti Akter et al. 2016
- M. humi Young et al. 2010
- M. hydrocarbonoxydans Schippers et al. 2005
- M. hydrothermale Zhang et al. 2014
- M. ihumii Yacouba et al. 2022
- M. immunditiarum Krishnamurthi et al. 2012
- M. imperiale (Steinhaus 1941) Collins et al. 1983
- M. indicum Shivaji et al. 2007
- M. insulae Yoon et al. 2009
- M. invictum Vaz-Moreira et al. 2009
- M. jejuense Kook et al. 2014
- M. karelineae Zhu et al. 2021
- M. keratanolyticum (Yokota et al. 1993) Takeuchi and Hatano 1998
- M. ketosireducens Takeuchi and Hatano 1998
- M. kitamiense Matsuyama et al. 1999
- M. koreense Lee et al. 2006
- M. kribbense Dastager et al. 2008
- M. kyungheense Kook et al. 2014
- M. lacticum Orla-Jensen 1919 (Approved Lists 1980)
- M. lacus Kageyama et al. 2008
- M. lacusdiani Zhang et al. 2017
- M. laevaniformans (ex Dias and Bhat 1962) Collins et al. 1983
- M. lemovicicum Mondani et al. 2013
- M. lindanitolerans Lal et al. 2010
- M. liquefaciens (Collins et al. 1983) Takeuchi and Hatano 1998
- M. lushaniae Tian et al. 2021
- M. luteolum (Yokota et al. 1993) Takeuchi and Hatano 1998
- M. luteum Xie et al. 2022
- M. luticocti Vaz-Moreira et al. 2008
- M. mangrovi Lee et al. 2014
- M. marinilacus Kageyama et al. 2007
- M. marinum Zhang et al. 2012
- M. maritypicum corrig. (ZoBell and Upham 1944) Takeuchi and Hatano 1998
- M. mitrae Kim et al. 2011
- M. murale ämpfer et al. 2012
- M. nanhaiense Yan et al. 2015
- M. natoriense Liu et al. 2005
- M. neimengense Gao et al. 2013
- M. nematophilum Hodgkin et al. 2000
- M. oleivorans Schippers et al. 2005
- M. oryzae Kumari et al. 2013
- M. otitidis Roland and Stroman 2002
- M. oxidans Ali et al. 2016
- M. oxydans (Chatelain and Second 1966) Schumann et al. 1999
- M. paludicola Park et al. 2006
- M. panaciterrae Nguyen et al. 2015
- M. paraoxydans Laffineur et al. 2003
- M. paulum Bellassi et al. 2021
- M. petrolearium Wang et al. 2014
- M. phyllosphaerae Behrendt et al. 2001
- M. populi Li et al. 2015
- M. profundi Wu et al. 2008
- M. protaetiae Heo et al. 2020
- M. proteolyticum Alves et al. 2015
- M. pseudoresistens Young et al. 2010
- M. pumilum Kageyama et al. 2006
- M. pygmaeum Kageyama et al. 2008
- M. pyrexiae Ko et al. 2007
- M. radiodurans Zhang et al. 2010
- M. resistens (Funke et al. 1998) Behrendt et al. 2001
- M. rhizomatis Hoang et al. 2015
- M. rhizosphaerae Cho and Lee 2017
- M. saccharophilum Ohta et al. 2013
- M. saperdae (Lysenko 1959) Takeuchi and Hatano 1998
- M. schleiferi (Yokota et al. 1993) Takeuchi and Hatano 1998
- M. sediminicola Kageyama et al. 2007
- M. sediminis Yu et al. 2013
- M. shaanxiense Peng et al. 2015
- M. soli Srinivasan et al. 2010
- M. sorbitolivorans Meng et al. 2016
- M. stercoris Zhang et al. 2021
- M. suaedae Zhu et al. 2019
- M. sulfonylureivorans Ma et al. 2022
- M. suwonense Anandham et al. 2012
- M. telephonicum Rahi et al. 2018
- M. terrae (Yokota et al. 1993) Takeuchi and Hatano 1998
- M. terregens (Lochhead and Burton 1953) Takeuchi and Hatano 1998
- M. terricola corrig. Kageyama et al. 2007
- M. testaceum (Komagata and Iizuka 1964) Takeuchi and Hatano 1998
- M. thalassium Takeuchi and Hatano 1998
- "M. timonense" Ndiaye et al. 2019
- M. trichothecenolyticum Yokota et al. 1993) Takeuchi and Hatano 1998
- M. tumbae Nishijima et al. 2017
- M. ulmi Rivas et al. 2004
- M. ureisolvens Cheng et al. 2019
- M. wangchenii Dong et al. 2020
- M. xylanilyticum Kim et al. 2005
- M. yannicii Karojet et al. 2012
- M. zeae Gao et al. 2017
