= Microbacterium kribbense =

Scientific classification
- Domain: Bacteria
- Kingdom: Bacillati
- Phylum: Actinomycetota
- Class: Actinomycetia
- Order: Micrococcales
- Family: Microbacteriaceae
- Genus: Microbacterium
- Species: M. kribbense

Binomial name
- Microbacterium kribbense Dastager et al. 2008

Type strain
- DSM 19265; JCM 16950; KCTC 19269; MSL-04

Species of bacterium

Microbacterium kribbense is a Gram-positive and rod-shaped bacterium from the genus Microbacterium which has been isolated from soil from the Bigeum Island in Korea.
