= Microbacterium deminutum =

Scientific classification
- Domain: Bacteria
- Kingdom: Bacillati
- Phylum: Actinomycetota
- Class: Actinomycetia
- Order: Micrococcales
- Family: Microbacteriaceae
- Genus: Microbacterium
- Species: M. deminutum

Binomial name
- Microbacterium deminutum Kageyama et al. 2006

Type strain
- JCM 14901; KV-483; NBRC 101278; NRRL B-24453

Species of bacterium

Microbacterium deminutum is a Gram-positive and non-motile bacterium from the genus Microbacterium.
