= Microbacterium hydrocarbonoxydans =

Scientific classification
- Domain: Bacteria
- Kingdom: Bacillati
- Phylum: Actinomycetota
- Class: Actinomycetia
- Order: Micrococcales
- Family: Microbacteriaceae
- Genus: Microbacterium
- Species: M. hydrocarbonoxydans

Binomial name
- Microbacterium hydrocarbonoxydans Schippers et al. 2005

Type strain
- BNP48; CIP 108713; DSM 16089; IAM 15235; JCM 14340; NBRC 103074; NCIMB 14002

Species of bacterium

Microbacterium hydrocarbonoxydans is a Gram-positive and Crude oil-degrading bacterium from the genus Microbacterium which has been isolated from oil contaminated soil in Germany.
