= Microbacterium suwonense =

Scientific classification
- Domain: Bacteria
- Kingdom: Bacillati
- Phylum: Actinomycetota
- Class: Actinomycetia
- Order: Micrococcales
- Family: Microbacteriaceae
- Genus: Microbacterium
- Species: M. suwonense

Binomial name
- Microbacterium suwonense Anandham et al. 2012

Type strain
- KACC 14058; M1T8B9; NBRC 106310

Species of bacterium

Microbacterium suwonense is a Gram-positive, non-spore-forming and non-motile bacterium from the genus Microbacterium which has been isolated from cow dung in Suwon in Korea.
