= Microbacterium marinum =

Scientific classification
- Domain: Bacteria
- Kingdom: Bacillati
- Phylum: Actinomycetota
- Class: Actinomycetia
- Order: Micrococcales
- Family: Microbacteriaceae
- Genus: Microbacterium
- Species: M. marinum

Binomial name
- Microbacterium marinum Zhang et al. 2012

Type strain
- CGMCC 4.6941; DSM 24947; H101

Species of bacterium

Microbacterium marinum is a Gram-positive and rod-shaped bacterium from the genus Microbacterium which has been isolated from seawater from the South-West Indian Ocean.
