= Microbacterium hominis =

Scientific classification
- Domain: Bacteria
- Kingdom: Bacillati
- Phylum: Actinomycetota
- Class: Actinomycetia
- Order: Micrococcales
- Family: Microbacteriaceae
- Genus: Microbacterium
- Species: M. hominis

Binomial name
- Microbacterium hominis Takeuchi and Hatano 1998

Type strain
- CCUG 52344 A CIP 105731; DSM 12509; DSMZ 12509; IAM 15210; IFO 15708; JCM 12413; LCDC 84-209; LCDC 840209; LMG 22182; NBRC 15708; NRRL B-24220; VKM Ac-2081

Species of bacterium

Microbacterium hominis is a bacterium from the genus Microbacterium which has been isolated from lung aspirate.
