= Microbacterium aurum =

Scientific classification
- Domain: Bacteria
- Kingdom: Bacillati
- Phylum: Actinomycetota
- Class: Actinomycetia
- Order: Micrococcales
- Family: Microbacteriaceae
- Genus: Microbacterium
- Species: M. aurum

Binomial name
- Microbacterium aurum Yokota et al. 1993

Type strain
- ATCC 51345; CIP 103994; DSM 8600; H-5; IFO 15204; JCM 9179; NBRC 15204; VKM Ac-1950

Species of bacterium

Microbacterium aurum is a bacterium of the family Microbacteriaceae.
