= Microbacterium sediminicola =

Scientific classification
- Domain: Bacteria
- Kingdom: Bacillati
- Phylum: Actinomycetota
- Class: Actinomycetia
- Order: Micrococcales
- Family: Microbacteriaceae
- Genus: Microbacterium
- Species: M. sediminicola

Binomial name
- Microbacterium sediminicola Kageyama et al. 2007

Type strain
- DSM 18905; JCM 15577; MBIC08264; YM10-847

Species of bacterium

Microbacterium sediminicola is a Gram-positive bacterium from the genus Microbacterium which has been isolated from sediments from the Samambula River on Fiji.
