= Microbacterium immunditiarum =

Scientific classification
- Domain: Bacteria
- Kingdom: Bacillati
- Phylum: Actinomycetota
- Class: Actinomycetia
- Order: Micrococcales
- Family: Microbacteriaceae
- Genus: Microbacterium
- Species: M. immunditiarum

Binomial name
- Microbacterium immunditiarum Krishnamurthi et al. 2012

Type strain
- JCM 14034; MTCC 7185; SK 18

Species of bacterium

Microbacterium immunditiarum is a Gram-positive and non-spore-forming bacterium from the genus Microbacterium which has been isolated from soil from a municipal landfill in Chandigarh, India.
