= Microbacterium binotii =

Scientific classification
- Domain: Bacteria
- Kingdom: Bacillati
- Phylum: Actinomycetota
- Class: Actinomycetia
- Order: Micrococcales
- Family: Microbacteriaceae
- Genus: Microbacterium
- Species: M. binotii

Binomial name
- Microbacterium binotii Clermont et al. 2009

Type strain
- CIP 101303; DSM 19164; JCM 16365

Species of bacterium

Microbacterium binotii is a Gram-positive, rod-shaped and non-spore-forming bacterium from the genus Microbacterium which has been isolated from human blood from Foch Hospital in Suresnes, France.
