= Microbacterium populi =

Scientific classification
- Domain: Bacteria
- Kingdom: Bacillati
- Phylum: Actinomycetota
- Class: Actinomycetia
- Order: Micrococcales
- Family: Microbacteriaceae
- Genus: Microbacterium
- Species: M. populi

Binomial name
- Microbacterium populi Li et al. 2015

Type strain
- CFCC 11275; KCTC 29152; 10-107-8; 1C-4; 3D-3; 4107_1_2; NHI3_6

Species of bacterium

Microbacterium populi is a Gram-positive, non-spore-formin and aerobic bacterium from the genus Microbacterium which has been isolated from the bark of Populus × euramericana.
