= Microbacterium shaanxiense =

Scientific classification
- Domain: Bacteria
- Kingdom: Bacillati
- Phylum: Actinomycetota
- Class: Actinomycetia
- Order: Micrococcales
- Family: Microbacteriaceae
- Genus: Microbacterium
- Species: M. shaanxiense

Binomial name
- Microbacterium shaanxiense Peng et al. 2015

Type strain
- DSM 28301; JCM 30164; CCNWSP60

Species of bacterium

Microbacterium shaanxiense is a Gram-positive and non-motile bacterium from the genus Microbacterium which has been isolated from the surface of a root nodule from a soybean (Glycine max).
