= Microbacterium neimengense =

Scientific classification
- Domain: Bacteria
- Kingdom: Bacillati
- Phylum: Actinomycetota
- Class: Actinomycetia
- Order: Micrococcales
- Family: Microbacteriaceae
- Genus: Microbacterium
- Species: M. neimengense

Binomial name
- Microbacterium neimengense Gao et al. 2013

Type strain
- 7087; ACCC 03008; DSM 24985

Species of bacterium

Microbacterium neimengense is a gram-positive, non-spore-forming, rod-shaped, and non-motile bacterium from the genus Microbacterium. It was isolated from the rhizosphere of a maize plant in China.
