= Microbacterium kyungheense =

Scientific classification
- Domain: Bacteria
- Kingdom: Bacillati
- Phylum: Actinomycetota
- Class: Actinomycetia
- Order: Micrococcales
- Family: Microbacteriaceae
- Genus: Microbacterium
- Species: M. kyungheense

Binomial name
- Microbacterium kyungheense Kook et al. 2014

Type strain
- JCM 18735; KACC 17124; THG-C26

Species of bacterium

Microbacterium kyungheense is a Gram-positive, aerobic, rod-shaped, non-spore-forming and non-motile bacterium from the genus Microbacterium which has been isolated from salty soil.
