= Microbacterium soli =

Scientific classification
- Domain: Bacteria
- Kingdom: Bacillati
- Phylum: Actinomycetota
- Class: Actinomycetia
- Order: Micrococcales
- Family: Microbacteriaceae
- Genus: Microbacterium
- Species: M. soli

Binomial name
- Microbacterium soli Srinivasan et al. 2010

Type strain
- DCY 17; JCM 17024; KCTC 19237; LMG 24010; Yang DCY 17

Species of bacterium

Microbacterium soli is a Gram-positive, aerobic, rod-shaped and non-motile bacterium from the genus Microbacterium which has been isolated from soil from a ginseng field in Daejeon, South Korea.
