= Microbacterium ulmi =

Scientific classification
- Domain: Bacteria
- Kingdom: Bacillati
- Phylum: Actinomycetota
- Class: Actinomycetia
- Order: Micrococcales
- Family: Microbacteriaceae
- Genus: Microbacterium
- Species: M. ulmi

Binomial name
- Microbacterium ulmi Rivas et al. 2004

Type strain
- CECT 5976; CIP 108339; DSM 16931; IAM 15295; JCM 14282; LMG 20991; XIL02

Synonyms
- Xylanomicrobium cellulosilyticum

Species of bacterium

Microbacterium ulmi is a Gram-positive, aerobic, xylanolytic, rod-shaped and non-motile bacterium from the genus Microbacterium which has been isolated from sawdust from the tree Ulmus nigra in Salamanca in Spain.
