= Microbacterium phyllosphaerae =

Scientific classification
- Domain: Bacteria
- Kingdom: Bacillati
- Phylum: Actinomycetota
- Class: Actinomycetia
- Order: Micrococcales
- Family: Microbacteriaceae
- Genus: Microbacterium
- Species: M. phyllosphaerae

Binomial name
- Microbacterium phyllosphaerae Behrendt et al. 2001

Type strain
- CIP 107138; DSM 13468; JCM 11571; LMG 19581; NBRC 103077; P 369/06

Species of bacterium

Microbacterium phyllosphaerae is a bacterium from the genus Microbacterium which has been isolated from the phyllosphere of grass in Germany.
