= Microbacterium petrolearium =

Scientific classification
- Domain: Bacteria
- Kingdom: Bacillati
- Phylum: Actinomycetota
- Class: Actinomycetes
- Order: Micrococcales
- Family: Microbacteriaceae
- Genus: Microbacterium
- Species: M. petrolearium

Binomial name
- Microbacterium petrolearium Wang et al. 2014

Type strain
- ACCC 00719; JCM 19612; LAM0410

Synonyms
- "Microbacterium huakuii" Wang et al. 2013

Species of bacterium

Microbacterium petrolearium is a Gram-positive, rod-shaped and aerobic bacterium from the genus Microbacterium which has been isolated from oil-contaminated water from the Dagang Oilfield in China.
