= Microbacterium barkeri =

Scientific classification
- Domain: Bacteria
- Kingdom: Bacillati
- Phylum: Actinomycetota
- Class: Actinomycetia
- Order: Micrococcales
- Family: Microbacteriaceae
- Genus: Microbacterium
- Species: M. barkeri

Binomial name
- Microbacterium barkeri (Collins et al. 1983) Takeuchi and Hatano 1998

Type strain
- ATCC 15954; BCRC 11642; Bhat; C748; CCM 1928; CCRC 11642; CCUG 33090; CGMCC 1.1902; CIP 102692; CNF 095; DSM 20145; Funke 684; HAMBI 1894; IAM 12585; IFO 15036; IMET 10688; IMSNU 10306; JCM 1343; KCTC 3197; LMG 16341; NBRC 15036; NCDO 2287; NCFB 2287; NCIB 9658; NCIMB 9658; NRRL B-24231; Suzuki CNF 095; VKM Ac-1020; VTT E-072706

Synonyms
- Aureobacterium barkeri (ex Dias et al. 1962) Collins et al. 1983; "Corynebacterium barkeri" Dias et al. 1962

Species of bacterium

Microbacterium barkeri is a bacterium from the genus Microbacterium which has been isolated from domestic sewage and from smear from a cheeses. Microbacterium barkeri has the ability to degrade polyvinyl alcohol.
