= Microbacterium flavum =

Scientific classification
- Domain: Bacteria
- Kingdom: Bacillati
- Phylum: Actinomycetota
- Class: Actinomycetia
- Order: Micrococcales
- Family: Microbacteriaceae
- Genus: Microbacterium
- Species: M. flavum

Binomial name
- Microbacterium flavum Kageyama et al. 2008

Type strain
- DSM 18909; JCM 15574; MBIC08278; YM18-098

Species of bacterium

Microbacterium flavum is a Gram-positive and aerobic bacterium from the genus Microbacterium which has been isolated from the tunicate Didemnum moseley in Nagasaki, Japan.
