= Microbacterium yannicii =

Scientific classification
- Domain: Bacteria
- Kingdom: Bacillati
- Phylum: Actinomycetota
- Class: Actinomycetia
- Order: Micrococcales
- Family: Microbacteriaceae
- Genus: Microbacterium
- Species: M. yannicii

Binomial name
- Microbacterium yannicii Karojet et al. 2012

Type strain
- DSM 23203; G72; JCM 18959; LMG 25521

Species of bacterium

Microbacterium yannicii is a Gram-positive, rod-shaped, microaerophilic and non-motile bacterium from the genus Microbacterium which has been isolated from roots of the plant Arabidopsis thaliana in Golm, Germany.
