= Phosphate solubilizing bacteria =

Bacteria

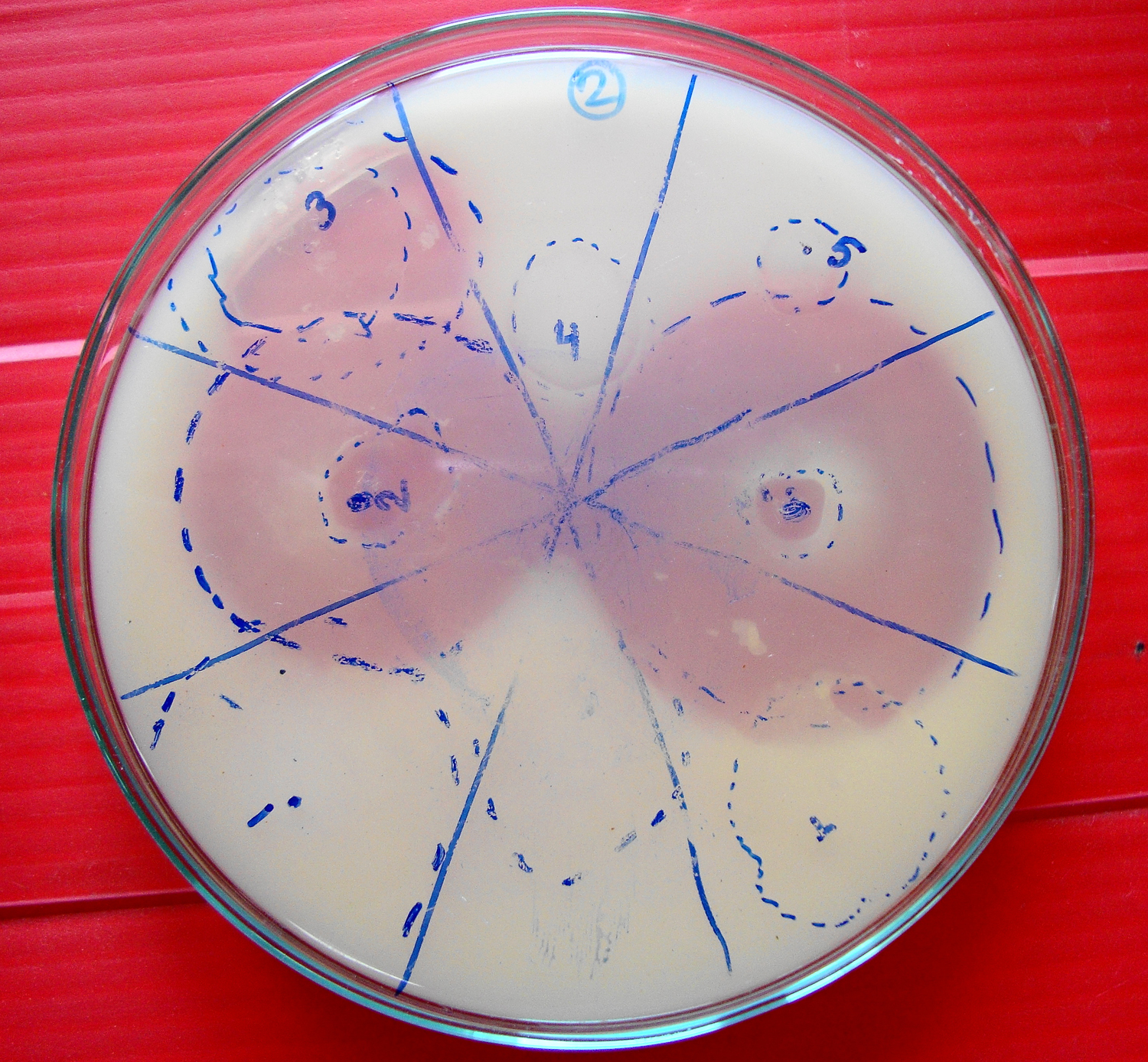
Phosphate solubilizing bacteria cultured in Petri dish. The zone of n clearance can be clearly seen.

Phosphate solubilizing bacteria (PSB) are beneficial bacteria capable of solubilizing inorganic phosphate from insoluble compounds. P-solubilization ability of rhizosphere microorganisms is considered to be one of the most important traits associated with plant phosphate nutrition. It is generally accepted that the mechanism of mineral phosphate solubilization by PSB strains is associated with the release of low molecular weight organic acids, through which their hydroxyl and carboxyl groups chelate the cations (ions that have positive charge on it) bound to phosphate, thereby converting it into soluble forms. PSB have been introduced to the Agricultural community as phosphate biofertilizer. Phosphorus (P) is one of the major essential macronutrients for plants and is applied to soil in the form of phosphate fertilizers. However, a large portion of soluble inorganic phosphate which is applied to the soil as chemical fertilizer is immobilized rapidly and becomes unavailable to plants. Currently, the main purpose in managing soil phosphorus is to optimize crop production and minimize P loss from soils. PSB have attracted the attention of agriculturists as soil inocula to improve the plant growth and yield. When PSB is used with phosphorite, it can save about 50% of the crop requirement of phosphatic fertilizer. The use of PSB as inoculants increases P uptake by plants. Simple inoculation of seeds with PSB gives crop yield responses equivalent to 30 kg/ha P_{2}O_{5}, or 50 percent of the need for phosphatic fertilizers. Alternatively, PSB can be applied through fertigation or in hydroponic operations. Many different strains of these bacteria have been identified as PSB, including Pantoea agglomerans (P5), Microbacterium laevaniformans (P7) and Pseudomonas putida (P13) strains are highly efficient insoluble phosphate solubilizers. Recently, researchers at Colorado State University demonstrated that a consortium of four bacteria synergistically solubilize phosphorus at a much faster rate than any single strain alone. Mahamuni and Patil (2012) isolated four strains of phosphate solubilizing bacteria from sugarcane (VIMP01 and VIMP02) and sugar beet rhizosphere (VIMP03 and VIMP 04). Isolates were strains of Burkholderia named as VIMP01, VIMP02, VIMP03 and VIMP04. VIMP (Vasantdada Sugar Institute Isolate by Mahamuni and Patil) cultures were identified as Burkholderia cenocepacia strain VIMP01 (JQ867371), Burkholderia gladioli strain VIMP02 (JQ811557), Burkholderia gladioli strain VIMP03 (JQ867372) and Burkholderia species strain VIMP04 (JQ867373).

Additionally, phosphate (P) compounds are capable of immobilizing heavy metals, especially lead (Pb), in contaminated environments through phosphate-heavy metal precipitation. However, most P compounds are not readily soluble in soils so it is not readily used for metal immobilization. PSB have the potential to enhance phosphate-induced immobilization of metals to remediate contaminated soil. However, there is a limit on the amount of phosphate which can be added to the environment due to the issue of eutrophication.

Phosphate is often adsorbed onto the surface of different type of minerals, for example iron containing minerals. Recent data suggest that bacteria growing under phosphorus starvation release iron-chelating molecules. Considering the geochemical interaction between these two elements, the authors suggest that some bacteria can dissolve iron-containing minerals in order to access the adsorbed phosphate.
