= Microbacterium halophilum =

Scientific classification
- Domain: Bacteria
- Kingdom: Bacillati
- Phylum: Actinomycetota
- Class: Actinomycetia
- Order: Micrococcales
- Family: Microbacteriaceae
- Genus: Microbacterium
- Species: M. halophilum

Binomial name
- Microbacterium halophilum Takeuchi and Hatano 1998

Type strain
- CIP 108905; DSM 12508; DSMZ 12508; IFO 16062; JCM 12077; NBRC 16062; NCIMB 13602; NRRL B-24219; N° 76; VKM Ac-2080

Species of bacterium

Microbacterium halophilum is a bacterium from the genus Microbacterium.<
