= Microbacterium terrae =

Scientific classification
- Domain: Bacteria
- Kingdom: Bacillati
- Phylum: Actinomycetota
- Class: Actinomycetes
- Order: Micrococcales
- Family: Microbacteriaceae
- Genus: Microbacterium
- Species: M. terrae

Binomial name
- Microbacterium terrae (Yokota et al. 1993) Takeuchi and Hatano 1998

Type strain
- A-1; ATCC 51476; CCM 4374; CIP 103816; DSM 8610; IAM 15209; FO 15300; JCM 9176; LMG 16471; NBRC 15300; NRRL B-24214; T. Sakane A-1; VKM Ac-1945

Synonyms
- Aureobacterium terrae Yokota et al. 1993

Species of bacterium

Microbacterium terrae is a bacterium from the genus of Microbacterium which has been isolated from soil in Osaka on Japan.
