= Microbacterium lindanitolerans =

Scientific classification
- Domain: Bacteria
- Kingdom: Bacillati
- Phylum: Actinomycetota
- Class: Actinomycetia
- Order: Micrococcales
- Family: Microbacteriaceae
- Genus: Microbacterium
- Species: M. lindanitolerans

Binomial name
- Microbacterium lindanitolerans Lal et al. 2010

Type strain
- CCM 7585; DSM 22422; MNA2

Species of bacterium

Microbacterium lindanitolerans is a Gram-positive, aerobic, rod-shaped bacterium from the genus Microbacterium. It was isolated from soil contaminated with hexachlorocyclohexane in India.
