= Microbacterium kitamiense =

Scientific classification
- Domain: Bacteria
- Kingdom: Bacillati
- Phylum: Actinomycetota
- Class: Actinomycetia
- Order: Micrococcales
- Family: Microbacteriaceae
- Genus: Microbacterium
- Species: M. kitamiense

Binomial name
- Microbacterium kitamiense Matsuyama et al. 1999

Type strain
- CIP 106320; DSM 13237; IAM 15189; IFO 16414; JCM 10270; Kitami C2; LMG 22055; NBRC 16414; NCIMB 13608; NRRL B-24226

Species of bacterium

Microbacterium kitamiense is a heterotrophic, strictly aerobic, mesophilic and non-motile bacterium from the genus Microbacterium which has been isolated from waste water from a sugar-beet factory in Kitami in Japan. Microbacterium kitamiense produces polysaccharide. Microbacterium kitamiense has a high GC-content.
