= Microbacterium halotolerans =

Scientific classification
- Domain: Bacteria
- Kingdom: Bacillati
- Phylum: Actinomycetota
- Class: Actinomycetes
- Order: Micrococcales
- Family: Microbacteriaceae
- Genus: Microbacterium
- Species: M. halotolerans

Binomial name
- Microbacterium halotolerans Li et al. 2005

Type strain
- CIP 108071; JCM 13013; KCTC 19017; YIM 70130

Species of bacterium

Microbacterium halotolerans is a Gram-positive, halophilic aerobic, non-spore-forming and non-motile bacterium from the genus Microbacterium which has been isolated from hypersaline soil in China.
