= Microbacterium ginsengisoli =

Scientific classification
- Domain: Bacteria
- Kingdom: Bacillati
- Phylum: Actinomycetota
- Class: Actinomycetia
- Order: Micrococcales
- Family: Microbacteriaceae
- Genus: Microbacterium
- Species: M. ginsengisoli

Binomial name
- Microbacterium ginsengisoli Park et al. 2008

Type strain
- DSM 18659; Gsoil 259; JCM 15304; KCTC 19189; Lee Gsoil 259; LMG 23807

Species of bacterium

Microbacterium ginsengisoli is a Gram-positive, heterotrophic, strictly aerobic bacterium from the genus Microbacterium which has been isolated from soil from a ginseng field in Daejeon, South Korea.
