= Microbacterium azadirachtae =

Scientific classification
- Domain: Bacteria
- Kingdom: Bacillati
- Phylum: Actinomycetota
- Class: Actinomycetia
- Order: Micrococcales
- Family: Microbacteriaceae
- Genus: Microbacterium
- Species: M. azadirachtae

Binomial name
- Microbacterium azadirachtae Madhaiyan et al. 2010

Type strain
- AI-S262; JCM 15681; KCTC 19668; LMG 24772

Species of bacterium

Microbacterium azadirachtae is a Gram-positive, non-spore-forming and motile bacterium from the genus Microbacterium which has been isolated from the rhizoplane of the plant Azadirachta indica from the Botanical Garden of Coimbatore in India. Microbacterium azadirachtae can promote plant growth by producing phytohormones.
