= Microbacterium amylolyticum =

Scientific classification
- Domain: Bacteria
- Kingdom: Bacillati
- Phylum: Actinomycetota
- Class: Actinomycetia
- Order: Micrococcales
- Family: Microbacteriaceae
- Genus: Microbacterium
- Species: M. amylolyticum

Binomial name
- Microbacterium amylolyticum Anand et al. 2012

Type strain
- CCM 7881; DSM 24221; N5

Species of bacterium

Microbacterium amylolyticum is a Gram-positive, heterotrophic, aerobic, non-spore-forming and non-motile bacterium from the genus Microbacterium which has been isolated from soil from an industrial waste site in Noida in India.
