= Microbacterium terricola =

Scientific classification
- Domain: Bacteria
- Kingdom: Bacillati
- Phylum: Actinomycetota
- Class: Actinomycetia
- Order: Micrococcales
- Family: Microbacteriaceae
- Genus: Microbacterium
- Species: M. terricola

Binomial name
- Microbacterium terricola corrig. Kageyama et al. 2007

Type strain
- JCM 14903; KV-448; NBRC 101801; NRRL B-24468

Synonyms
- Microbacterium terricolae Kageyama et al. 2007

Species of bacterium

Microbacterium terricola is a Gram-positive and non-motile bacterium from the genus Microbacterium which has been isolated from soil from Japan.
