= Microbacterium indicum =

Scientific classification
- Domain: Bacteria
- Kingdom: Bacillati
- Phylum: Actinomycetota
- Class: Actinomycetia
- Order: Micrococcales
- Family: Microbacteriaceae
- Genus: Microbacterium
- Species: M. indicum

Binomial name
- Microbacterium indicum Shivaji et al. 2007

Type strain
- BBH6; CIP 109607; DSM 19969; IAM 15355; JCM 21800; LMG 23459

Species of bacterium

Microbacterium indicum is a bacterium from the genus Microbacterium which has been isolated from deep-sea sediments from the Chagos Trench in the Indian Ocean.
