= Microbacterium paludicola =

Scientific classification
- Domain: Bacteria
- Kingdom: Bacillati
- Phylum: Actinomycetota
- Class: Actinomycetia
- Order: Micrococcales
- Family: Microbacteriaceae
- Genus: Microbacterium
- Species: M. paludicola

Binomial name
- Microbacterium paludicola Park et al. 2006

Type strain
- DSM 16915; JCM 14308; KCTC 19080; US15

Species of bacterium

Microbacterium paludicola is a Gram-positive, xylanolytic, short-rod-shaped and non-motile bacterium from the genus Microbacterium which has been isolated from swamp forest soil from Ulsan, Korea.
