= Microbacterium oxydans =

Scientific classification
- Domain: Bacteria
- Kingdom: Bacillati
- Phylum: Actinomycetota
- Class: Actinomycetes
- Order: Micrococcales
- Family: Microbacteriaceae
- Genus: Microbacterium
- Species: M. oxydans

Binomial name
- Microbacterium oxydans (Chatelain and Second 1966) Schumann et al. 1999

Type strain
- BCRC 12117; CCRC 12117; CIP 66.12; CIP 66.12T; CIP 6612; DSM 20578; IAM 15197; IFO 15586; JCM 12414; KCTC 3256; LMG 23389; NBRC 15586; NCIB 9944; NCIMB 9944; NRRL B-24236; VKM Ac-2116; X98

Synonyms
- Brevibacterium oxydans Chatelain and Second 1966 (Approved Lists 1980)

Species of bacterium

Microbacterium oxydans is a Gram-positive bacterium from the genus Microbacterium which occurs in human clinical specimens. Microbacterium oxydans has the ability to degrade alginate and laminarin.

Microbacterium oxydans can grow at lower temperatures (4°C); however, it struggles to grow at higher temperatures (48°C). It has been found as an endophyte within plant tissues. The bacterium is halotolerant with the ability to grow on media that is up to 10% sodium chloride. On a TSA (tryptic soy agar) plate, Microbacterium oxydans colonies exhibit a striking bright yellow color.
