= Microbacterium ginsengiterrae =

Scientific classification
- Domain: Bacteria
- Kingdom: Bacillati
- Phylum: Actinomycetota
- Class: Actinomycetia
- Order: Micrococcales
- Family: Microbacteriaceae
- Genus: Microbacterium
- Species: M. ginsengiterrae

Binomial name
- Microbacterium ginsengiterrae Kim et al. 2010

Type strain
- JCM 15516; KCTC 19526; DCY37

Species of bacterium

Microbacterium ginsengiterrae is a Gram-positive, heterotrophic, strictly aerobic and non-motile bacterium from the genus Microbacterium which has been isolated from soil from a ginseng field in Korea.
