= Microbacterium hydrothermale =

Scientific classification
- Domain: Bacteria
- Kingdom: Bacillati
- Phylum: Actinomycetota
- Class: Actinomycetia
- Order: Micrococcales
- Family: Microbacteriaceae
- Genus: Microbacterium
- Species: M. hydrothermale

Binomial name
- Microbacterium hydrothermale Zhang et al. 2014

Type strain
- 0704C9-2; CGMCC 1.12512; LMG 27542

Species of bacterium

Microbacterium hydrothermale is a Gram-positive, aerobic, rod-shaped and non-motile bacterium from the genus Microbacterium which has been isolated from hydrothermal sediments from the Indian Ocean.
