= Microbacterium aoyamense =

Scientific classification
- Domain: Bacteria
- Kingdom: Bacillati
- Phylum: Actinomycetota
- Class: Actinomycetia
- Order: Micrococcales
- Family: Microbacteriaceae
- Genus: Microbacterium
- Species: M. aoyamense

Binomial name
- Microbacterium aoyamense Kageyama et al. 2006

Type strain
- JCM 14900; KV-492; NBRC 101280; NRRL B-24451

Species of bacterium

Microbacterium aoyamense is a Gram-positive and non-motile bacterium from the genus Microbacterium which has been isolated from soil from Tokyo in Japan.
