= Microbacterium halimionae =

Scientific classification
- Domain: Bacteria
- Kingdom: Bacillati
- Phylum: Actinomycetota
- Class: Actinomycetia
- Order: Micrococcales
- Family: Microbacteriaceae
- Genus: Microbacterium
- Species: M. halimionae

Binomial name
- Microbacterium halimionae Alves et al. 2015

Type strain
- CECT 8593; DSM 27576; PA36

Species of bacterium

Microbacterium halimionae is a bacterium from the genus Microbacterium which has been isolated from the salt-marsh plant Halimione portulacoides near the Ria de Aveiro in Murtosa, Portugal.
