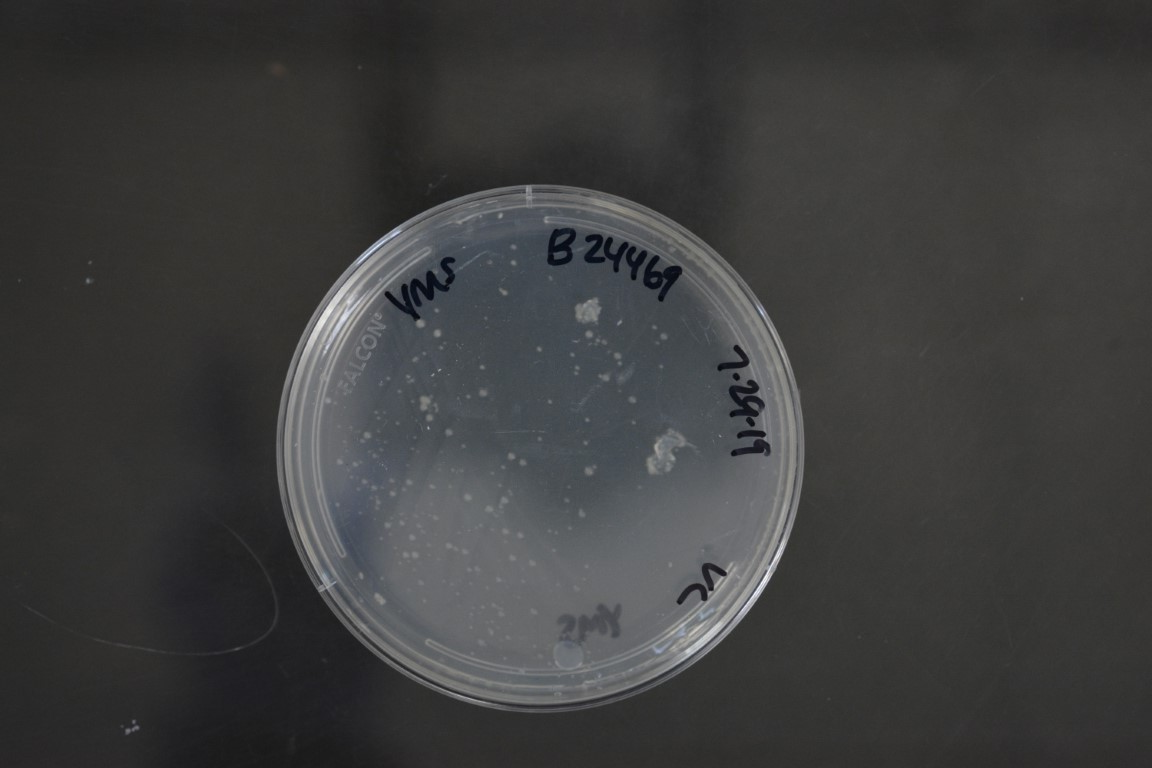

Scientific classification
- Domain: Bacteria
- Kingdom: Bacillati
- Phylum: Actinomycetota
- Class: Actinomycetes
- Order: Micrococcales
- Family: Microbacteriaceae
- Genus: Microbacterium
- Species: M. pygmaeum

Binomial name
- Microbacterium pygmaeum Kageyama et al. 2008

Type strain
- JCM 15925; NBRC 101800; NRRL B-24469; KV-490

= Microbacterium pygmaeum =

Species of bacterium

Microbacterium pygmaeum is a Gram-positive, aerobic and non-motile bacterium from the genus Microbacterium which has been isolated from soil from the Aoyama Cemetery in Tokyo, Japan.
