= Microbacterium ketosireducens =

Scientific classification
- Domain: Bacteria
- Kingdom: Bacillati
- Phylum: Actinomycetota
- Class: Actinomycetia
- Order: Micrococcales
- Family: Microbacteriaceae
- Genus: Microbacterium
- Species: M. ketosireducens

Binomial name
- Microbacterium ketosireducens Takeuchi and Hatano 1998

Type strain
- CIP 105732; DSM 12510; DSMZ 12510; IAM 15201; IFO 14548; Imai KN-2479; JCM 12078; KN-2479; NBRC 14548; NCIMB 13603; NRRL B-24221; VKM Ac-2082

Species of bacterium

Microbacterium ketosireducens is a bacterium from the genus Microbacterium which has been isolated from soil.
