= Microbacterium resistens =

Scientific classification
- Domain: Bacteria
- Kingdom: Bacillati
- Phylum: Actinomycetota
- Class: Actinomycetia
- Order: Micrococcales
- Family: Microbacteriaceae
- Genus: Microbacterium
- Species: M. resistens

Binomial name
- Microbacterium resistens (Funke et al. 1998) Behrendt et al. 2001

Type strain
- CCM 4912; CUG 28312; CCUG 38312; CIP 107265; DMMZ 1710; DSM 11986; Funke 1710; IAM 15192; IFM 10515; JCM 11686; LMG 22202; NBRC 103078; NRRL B-24216

Synonyms
- Aureobacterium resistens Funke et al. 1998

Species of bacterium

Microbacterium resistens is a bacterium from the genus Microbacterium which has been isolated from a corneal ulcer in Zürich, Switzerland.
