= Microbacterium aquimaris =

Scientific classification
- Domain: Bacteria
- Kingdom: Bacillati
- Phylum: Actinomycetota
- Class: Actinomycetia
- Order: Micrococcales
- Family: Microbacteriaceae
- Genus: Microbacterium
- Species: M. aquimaris

Binomial name
- Microbacterium aquimaris Kim et al. 2008

Type strain
- DSM 19713; JCM 15625; JS54-2; KCTC 19124

Species of bacterium

Microbacterium aquimaris is a Gram-positive, non-spore-forming and non-motile bacterium from the genus Microbacterium which has been isolated from seawater from Jeju in Korea. the major menaquinones of Microbacterium aquimaris are MK-11, MK-12 and MK-10.
