= Microbacterium arthrosphaerae =

Scientific classification
- Domain: Bacteria
- Kingdom: Bacillati
- Phylum: Actinomycetota
- Class: Actinomycetia
- Order: Micrococcales
- Family: Microbacteriaceae
- Genus: Microbacterium
- Species: M. arthrosphaerae

Binomial name
- Microbacterium arthrosphaerae Kämpfer et al. 2011

Type strain
- CC-VM-Y; CCM 7681; DSM 22421

Species of bacterium

Microbacterium arthrosphaerae is a Gram-positive and rod-shaped bacterium from the genus Microbacterium which has been isolated from the pill millipede Arthrosphaera magna in India.
