= Microbacterium murale =

Scientific classification
- Domain: Bacteria
- Kingdom: Bacillati
- Phylum: Actinomycetota
- Class: Actinomycetia
- Order: Micrococcales
- Family: Microbacteriaceae
- Genus: Microbacterium
- Species: M. murale

Binomial name
- Microbacterium murale Kämpfer et al. 2012

Type strain
- 01-Gi-001; CCM 7640; DSM 22178

Species of bacterium

Microbacterium murale is a Gram-positive bacterium from the genus Microbacterium which has been isolated from an indoor wall in Giessen in Germany.
