= Microbacterium endophyticum =

Scientific classification
- Domain: Bacteria
- Kingdom: Bacillati
- Phylum: Actinomycetota
- Class: Actinomycetia
- Order: Micrococcales
- Family: Microbacteriaceae
- Genus: Microbacterium
- Species: M. endophyticum

Binomial name
- Microbacterium endophyticum Alves et al. 2015

Type strain
- CECT 8354; DSM 27099; AAA-2014; PA15

Species of bacterium

Microbacterium endophyticum is a bacterium from the genus Microbacterium which has been isolated from the plant Halimione portulacoides from the Ria de Aveiro in Portugal.
