= Microbacterium paraoxydans =

Scientific classification
- Domain: Bacteria
- Kingdom: Bacillati
- Phylum: Actinomycetota
- Class: Actinomycetes
- Order: Micrococcales
- Family: Microbacteriaceae
- Genus: Microbacterium
- Species: M. paraoxydans

Binomial name
- Microbacterium paraoxydans Laffineur et al. 2003

Type strain
- CCUG 46601; CF36; CIP 108082; DSM 15019; DSM 15109; IAM 15196; IFM 10517; JCM 12372; LMG 23172; NBRC 103076; NRRL B-24275; UCL CF36; VTT E-072721

Species of bacterium

Microbacterium paraoxydans is a Gram-positive bacterium from the genus Microbacterium which was first isolated from the fish Nile tilapia in Mexico. This bacterium can cause disease in fish. Microbacterium paraoxydans metabolize (RS)-mandelonitrile to (R)-(-)mandelic acid. Microbacterium paraoxydans is a plant growth-promoting bacteria.
