= Microbacterium aurantiacum =

Scientific classification
- Domain: Bacteria
- Kingdom: Bacillati
- Phylum: Actinomycetota
- Class: Actinomycetia
- Order: Micrococcales
- Family: Microbacteriaceae
- Genus: Microbacterium
- Species: M. aurantiacum

Binomial name
- Microbacterium aurantiacum Takeuchi and Hatano 1998

Type strain
- 8-3-56; ATCC 49090; C820; CIP 105730; Dias & Bhat NCDO2288; DSM 12506; DSMZ 12506; IAM 15208; IFO 15234; JCM 9177; NBRC 15234; NCDO 2288; NCFB 2288; NCIMB 702288; NRRL B-24217; VKM Ac-2075

Species of bacterium

Microbacterium aurantiacum is a bacterium from the genus Microbacterium which has been isolated from sewage.
