= Microbacterium sediminis =

Scientific classification
- Domain: Bacteria
- Kingdom: Bacillati
- Phylum: Actinomycetota
- Class: Actinomycetia
- Order: Micrococcales
- Family: Microbacteriaceae
- Genus: Microbacterium
- Species: M. sediminis

Binomial name
- Microbacterium sediminis Yu et al. 2013

Type strain
- CCTCC AB2010363; DSM 23767; MCCC 1A06153; YLB-01

Synonyms
- Microbacterium marina

Species of bacterium

Microbacterium sediminis is a Gram-positive, rod-shaped, aerobic, psychrotolerant, thermotolerant, halotolerant, alkalitolerant bacterium from the genus Microbacterium which has been isolated from deep-sea sediments from the Indian Ocean.
