= Microbacterium marinilacus =

Scientific classification
- Domain: Bacteria
- Kingdom: Bacillati
- Phylum: Actinomycetota
- Class: Actinomycetia
- Order: Micrococcales
- Family: Microbacteriaceae
- Genus: Microbacterium
- Species: M. marinilacus

Binomial name
- Microbacterium marinilacus Kageyama et al. 2007

Type strain
- CIP 109809; CIP 109810; DSM 18904; JCM 16546; MBIC07778; YM11-607

Species of bacterium

Microbacterium marinilacus is a Gram-positive bacterium from the genus Microbacterium which has been isolated from the Sano Marine Lake in the Republic of Palau.
