= Microbacterium saccharophilum =

Scientific classification
- Domain: Bacteria
- Kingdom: Bacillati
- Phylum: Actinomycetota
- Class: Actinomycetia
- Order: Micrococcales
- Family: Microbacteriaceae
- Genus: Microbacterium
- Species: M. saccharophilum

Binomial name
- Microbacterium saccharophilum Ohta et al. 2013

Type strain
- K-1; NBRC 108778; NCIMB 14782

Species of bacterium

Microbacterium saccharophilums is a Gram-positive, non-spore-forming, rod-shaped and non-motile bacterium from the genus Microbacterium which has been isolated from soil from a sucrose-refining factory in Japan.
