= Microbacterium proteolyticum =

Scientific classification
- Domain: Bacteria
- Kingdom: Bacillati
- Phylum: Actinomycetota
- Class: Actinomycetia
- Order: Micrococcales
- Family: Microbacteriaceae
- Genus: Microbacterium
- Species: M. proteolyticum

Binomial name
- Microbacterium proteolyticum Alves et al. 2015

Type strain
- CECT 8356; DSM 27100; RZ36

Species of bacterium

Microbacterium proteolyticum is a bacterium from the genus Microbacterium which has been isolated from the roots of the plant Halimione portulacoides in Ria de Aveiro, Portugal.
