= Microbacterium mitrae =

Scientific classification
- Domain: Bacteria
- Kingdom: Bacillati
- Phylum: Actinomycetota
- Class: Actinomycetia
- Order: Micrococcales
- Family: Microbacteriaceae
- Genus: Microbacterium
- Species: M. mitrae

Binomial name
- Microbacterium mitrae Kim et al. 2011

Type strain
- JCM 16363; KACC 21129; M4-8

Species of bacterium

Microbacterium mitrae is a Gram-positive, non-spore-forming and non-motile bacterium from the genus Microbacterium which has been isolated from a turban shell in Korea.
