= Microbacterium laevaniformans =

Scientific classification
- Domain: Bacteria
- Kingdom: Bacillati
- Phylum: Actinomycetota
- Class: Actinomycetia
- Order: Micrococcales
- Family: Microbacteriaceae
- Genus: Microbacterium
- Species: M. laevaniformans

Binomial name
- Microbacterium laevaniformans (ex Dias and Bhat 1962) Collins et al. 1983

Type strain
- ATCC 15953; CIP 100934; DSM 20140; IFO 14471; JCM 9181; NBRC 14471; NCIB 9659; NCIMB 9659; VKM Ac-1138

Synonyms
- "Corynebacterium laevaniformans" Dias and Bhat 1962

Species of bacterium

Microbacterium laevaniformans is a bacterium from the genus Microbacterium.
