= Microbacterium foliorum =

Scientific classification
- Domain: Bacteria
- Kingdom: Bacillati
- Phylum: Actinomycetota
- Class: Actinomycetia
- Order: Micrococcales
- Family: Microbacteriaceae
- Genus: Microbacterium
- Species: M. foliorum

Binomial name
- Microbacterium foliorum Behrendt et al. 2001

Type strain
- CIP 107137; DSM 12966; IAM 15188; JCM 11569; KCTC 19915; LMG 19580; NBRC 103072; NRRL B-24224; P 333/02

Species of bacterium

Microbacterium foliorum is a bacterium from the genus Microbacterium which has been isolated from the phyllosphere of grasses in Germany.
