= Microbacterium esteraromaticum =

Scientific classification
- Domain: Bacteria
- Kingdom: Bacillati
- Phylum: Actinomycetota
- Class: Actinomycetia
- Order: Micrococcales
- Family: Microbacteriaceae
- Genus: Microbacterium
- Species: M. esteraromaticum

Binomial name
- Microbacterium esteraromaticum (Omelianski 1923) Takeuchi and Hatano 1998

Type strain
- ATCC 8091; CIP 103916; DSM 8609; IFO 3751; JCM 9172; LMG 4020; NBRC 3751; VKM Ac-1942

Synonyms
- Aureobacterium esteraromaticum (Omelianski 1923) Yokota et al. 1993; "Bacterium esteraromaticum" Omelianski 1923; Flavobacterium esteraromaticum (Omelianski 1923) Bergey et al. 1930 (Approved Lists 1980)

Species of bacterium

Microbacterium esteraromaticum is a rod shaped, gram positive species of bacteria under genus Microbacterium. Its G+C content of DNA is 69.3 to 69.7 mol%. It has other name, that is Flavobacterium esteraromaticum. In a culture of 30 degree Celsius it grows best.
