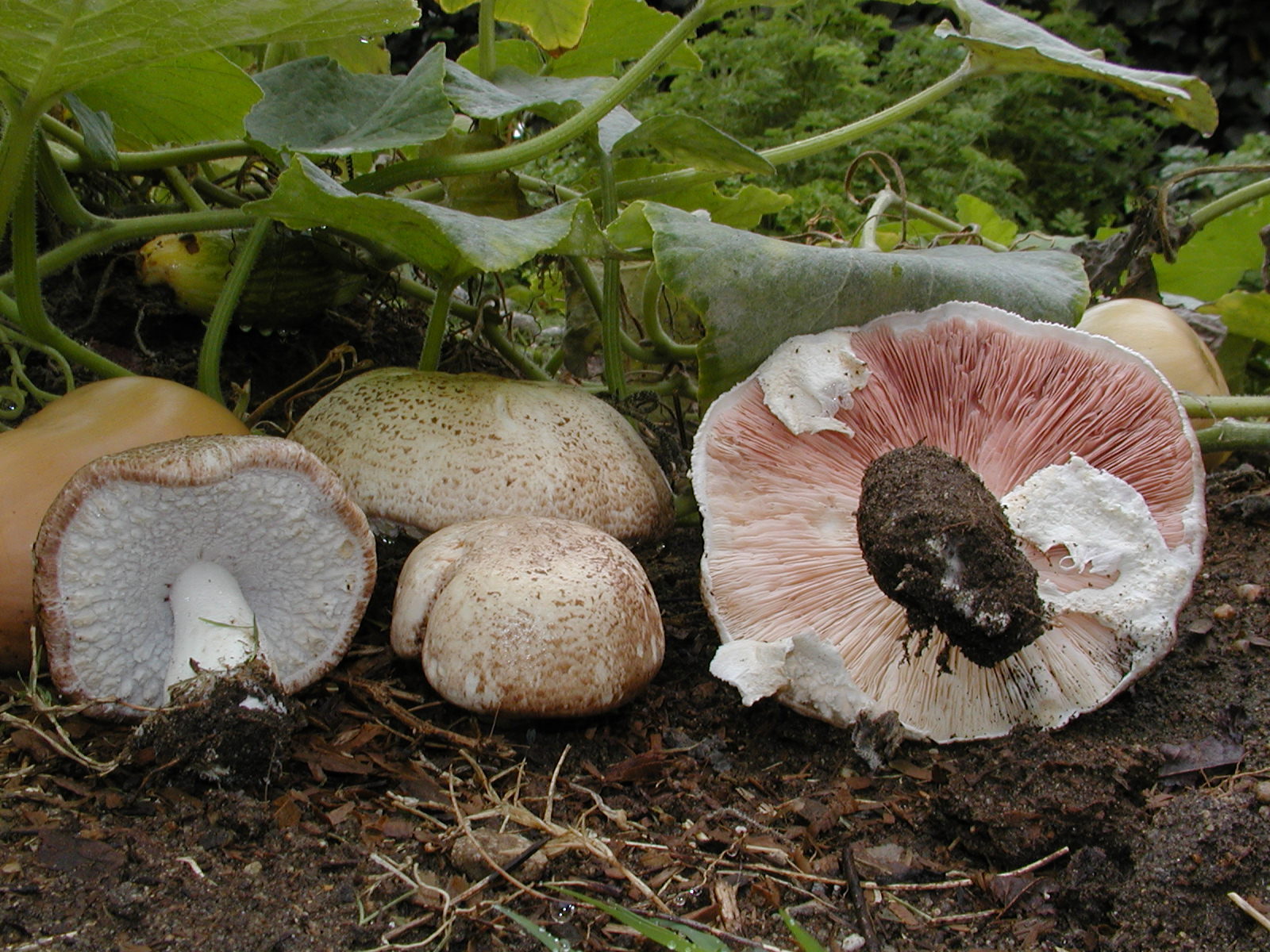
- Agaricus subrufescens
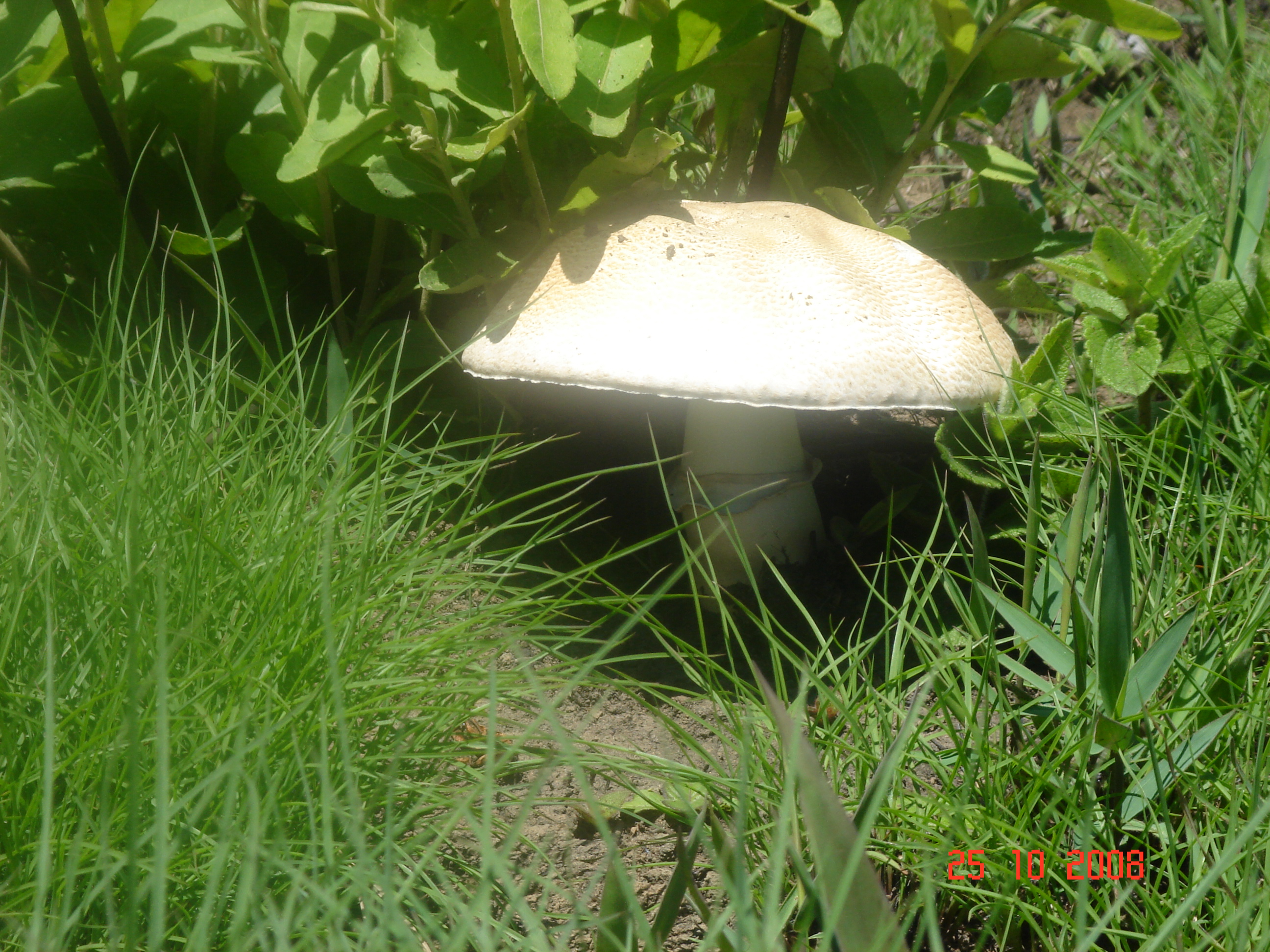

Scientific classification
- Kingdom: Fungi
- Division: Basidiomycota
- Class: Agaricomycetes
- Order: Agaricales
- Family: Agaricaceae
- Genus: Agaricus
- Species: A. subrufescens

Binomial name
- Agaricus subrufescens Peck (1893)

Synonyms
- Agaricus rufotegulis Nauta (1999); Agaricus brasiliensis Wasser, M. Didukh, Amazonas & Stamets (2002) [nom. illegit., non A. brasiliensis Fr. (1830)]; Agaricus blazei auct. non Murrill (1945)

= Agaricus subrufescens =

Species of fungus

Agaricus subrufescens
- Mycological characteristics
- Gills on hymenium
- Cap is convex
- Hymenium is free
- Stipe has a ring
- Spore print is brown
- Ecology is saprotrophic
- Edibility is not recommended

Agaricus subrufescens (syn. Agaricus blazei, A. brasiliensis or A. rufotegulis) is a species of fungus, commonly known as the almond mushroom. (Note: Other names include almond agaricus, mushroom of the sun, God's mushroom, mushroom of life, royal sun agaricus, jisongrong, or himematsutake (Chinese: 姬松茸, Japanese: 姫まつたけ, "princess matsutake").) It is edible for most people, with a somewhat sweet taste and a fragrance of almonds.

== Taxonomy ==
Agaricus subrufescens was first described by the American botanist Charles Horton Peck in 1893. During the late 19th and early 20th centuries, it was cultivated for the table in the eastern United States. It was discovered again in Brazil during the 1970s, and misidentified as Agaricus blazei Murrill, a species originally described from Florida. It was soon marketed for purported medicinal properties under various names, including ABM (for Agaricus blazei Murrill), cogumelo do sol (mushroom of the sun), cogumelo de Deus (mushroom of God), cogumelo de vida (mushroom of life), himematsutake, royal sun agaricus, Mandelpilz, and almond mushroom.

In 2002, Didukh and Wasser correctly rejected the name A. blazei for this species, but called the Brazilian fungus A. brasiliensis, a name that had already been used for a different species, Agaricus brasiliensis Fr. (1830). Richard Kerrigan undertook genetic and interfertility testing on several fungal strains, and showed that samples of the Brazilian strains called A. blazei and A. brasiliensis were genetically similar to, and interfertile with, North American populations of Agaricus subrufescens. These tests also found European samples called A. rufotegulis to be of the same species. Because A. subrufescens is the oldest name, it has taxonomical priority.

== Description ==
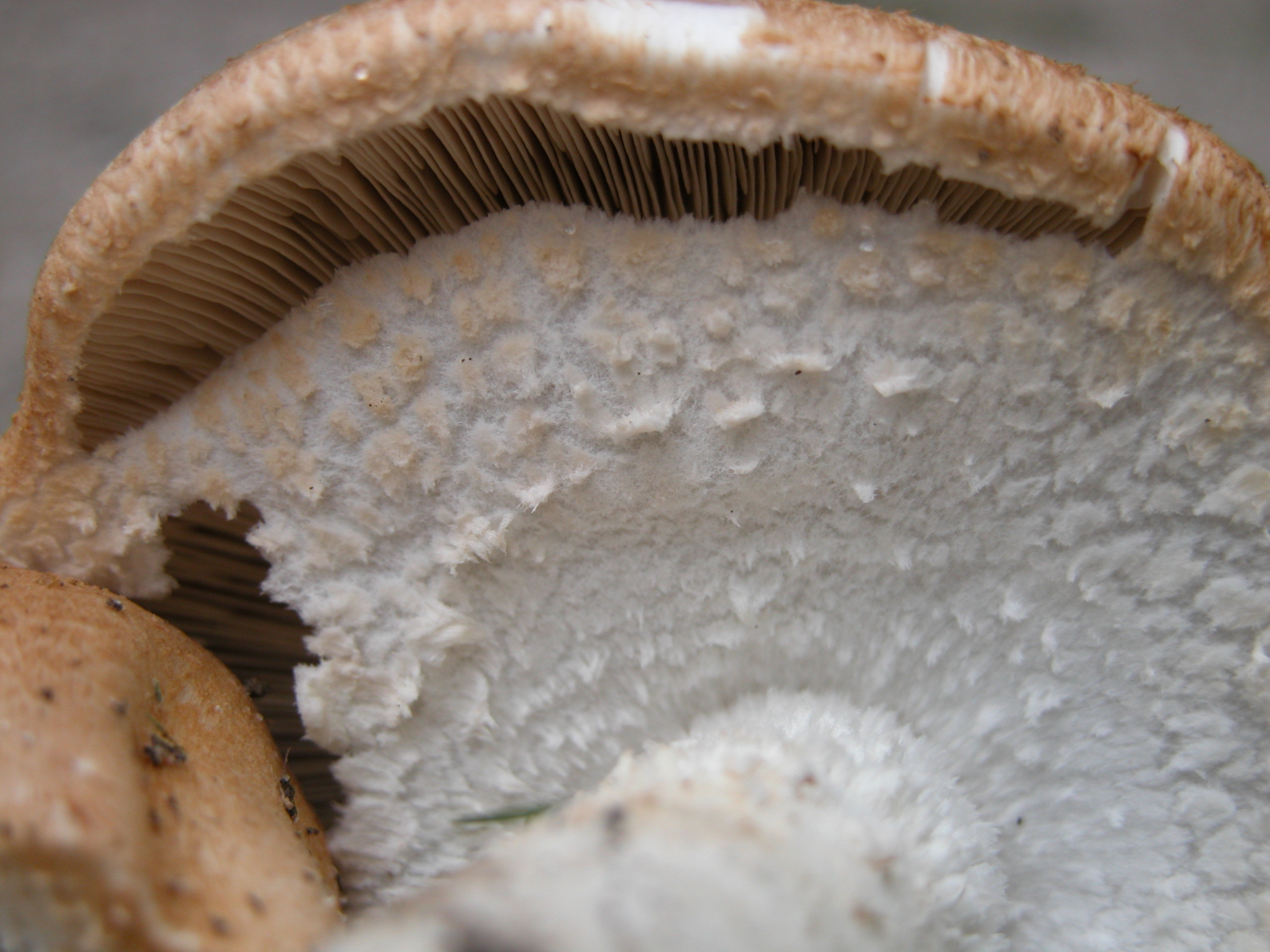
The floccose stipe and annulus of A. subrufescens

The cap is initially hemispherical, later becoming convex, with a diameter of 5 to 25 centimetres (2 to 10 inches). The color of the cap may range from white to grayish or dull reddish brown; it stains yellow in KOH. Its surface is covered with silk-like fibers, although in maturity it develops small scales (squamulose). The cap margin typically splits with age. The flesh is white, and has the taste of "green nuts", with the odor of almonds. The gills are not attached to the stalk (free), narrow, and crowded closely together. They start out whitish in color, then later pinkish, and finally black-brown as the spores mature. The spore print is brown. The spores are ellipsoid, smooth, dark purplish-brown when viewed microscopically, with dimensions of 5.5–7 by 4–5 μm.

The stipe is 6 to 15 cm (2 1/2 to 6 in) long and 1 to 4 cm (1/2 to 1 1/2 in) thick, and sometimes bulbous at the base. Initially solid, the stipe becomes hollow with age; it is cottony (floccose) to scaly toward the base. The annulus is abundant and double-layered; it is bent downward toward the stem, smooth and whitish on the upper side, and covered with cottony scales on the lower side.

A type of ergostane-type compounds called blazeispirols have been isolated from A. subrufescens.

=== Similar species ===
It resembles some related species, including A. hondensis.

== Distribution and habitat ==
A. subrufescens forms fruit bodies singly or in clusters in leaf litter in rich soil, often in domestic habitats. Originally described from the northeastern U.S. and Canada, it has been found growing in California, Hawaii, Great Britain, the Netherlands, Taiwan, Japan, Philippines, Iran, Australia, Brazil, and Uruguay.

== Toxicity ==
Preliminary research indicates Agaricus subrufescens may have toxic effects on liver function marked by increased serum level of liver enzymes, especially in people with ovarian cancer, and may cause allergic reactions.

Contrary to concerns about possible hepatotoxicity, multiple peer-reviewed studies suggest that A. subrufescens (A. blazei Murill) exhibits hepatoprotective effects rather than toxicity in both human and animal models.

- Clinical Study in Hepatitis B Patients: A 12-month open-label clinical study observed that 1,500 mg/day of A. blazei extract significantly reduced serum liver enzyme levels (ALT and AST) in chronic hepatitis B patients, indicating improved liver function without any adverse effects. No liver toxicity or renal abnormalities were reported in the patients throughout the study period.
- Animal Studies on Alcohol and CCl4-Induced Liver Injury: Experimental models in rats demonstrated that ABM extract has protective and antioxidant effects against liver injury caused by alcohol and carbon tetrachloride (CCl4). These studies reported normalization of liver enzymes, increased antioxidant levels (GSH, vitamins C and E), and reduced lipid peroxidation, without evidence of liver toxicity.

The U.S. Food and Drug Administration has issued warning letters to companies marketing Agaricus supplement products with unproven health claims of suggesting disease treatment or prevention, but these actions were based on regulatory compliance and lack of efficacy data rather then on evidence of toxicity.

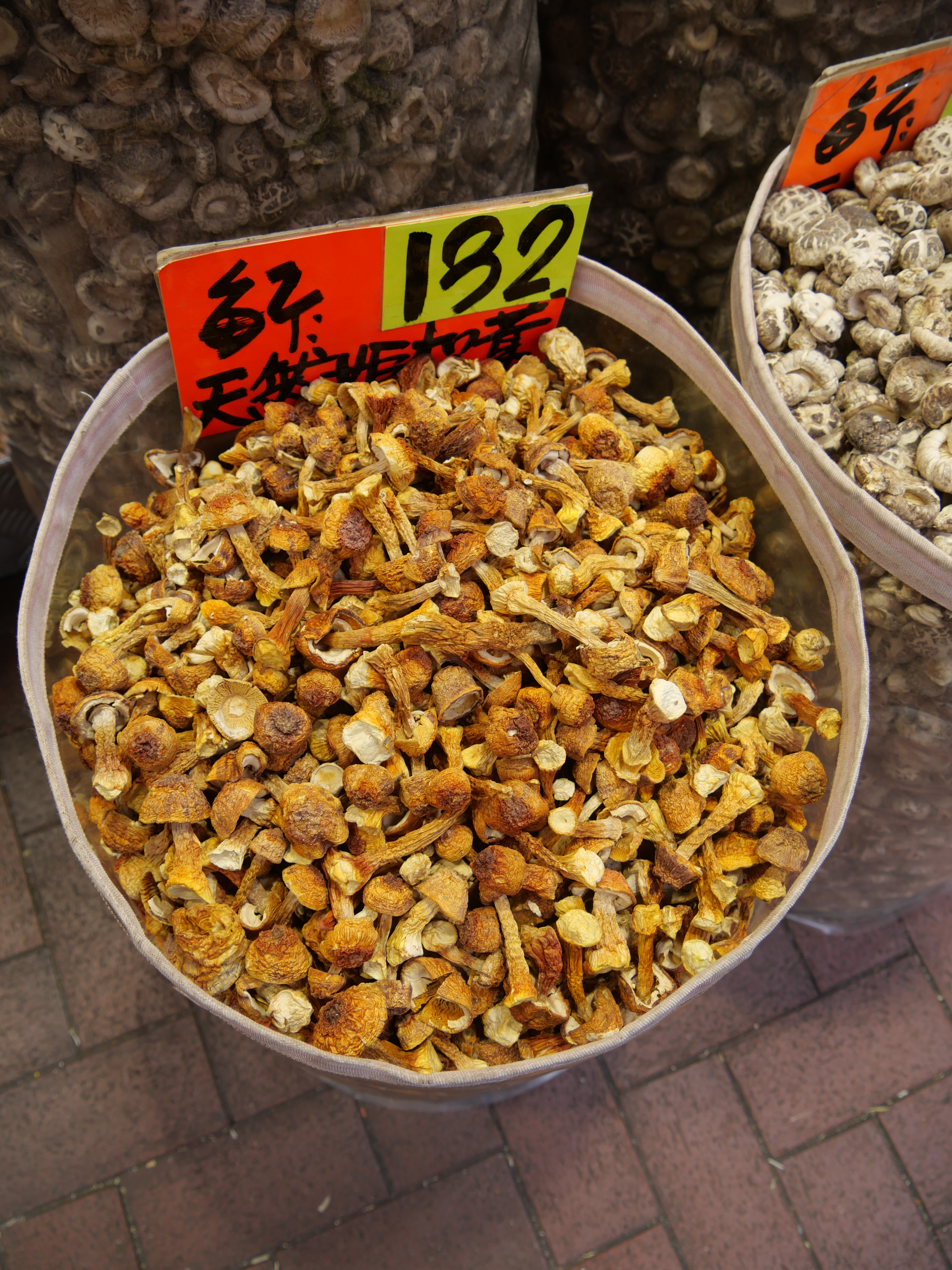
Dried jisongrong being sold in Tsuen Wan, Hong Kong

== Uses ==
The mushroom is edible for most people, with a somewhat sweet almond-like aroma and flavor resulting from benzaldehyde, benzyl alcohol, benzonitrile, and methyl benzoate.

Used in traditional and alternative medicine for supposed anti-cancer effects, Agaricus mushrooms have not been assessed by sufficient high-quality clinical research to define safety and biological properties upon consumption as a food, dietary supplement, or drug.

== See also ==
- List of Agaricus species
