= Microbiome =

Microbial community assemblage and activity

A microbiome (from Ancient Greek μικρός (mikrós) 'small' and βίος (bíos) 'life') is the community of microorganisms that can usually be found living together in any given habitat. It was defined more precisely in 1988 by Whipps et al. as "a characteristic microbial community occupying a reasonably well-defined habitat which has distinct physio-chemical properties. The term thus not only refers to the microorganisms involved but also encompasses their theatre of activity". In 2020, an international panel of experts published the outcome of their discussions on the definition of the microbiome. They proposed a definition of the microbiome based on a revival of the "compact, clear, and comprehensive description of the term" as originally provided by Whipps et al., but supplemented with two explanatory paragraphs, the first pronouncing the dynamic character of the microbiome, and the second clearly separating the term microbiota from the term microbiome.

The microbiota consists of all living members forming the microbiome. Most microbiome researchers agree bacteria, archaea, fungi, algae, and small protists should be considered as members of the microbiome. The integration of phages, viruses, plasmids, and mobile genetic elements is more controversial. Whipps's "theatre of activity" includes the essential role secondary metabolites play in mediating complex interspecies interactions and ensuring survival in competitive environments. Quorum sensing induced by small molecules allows bacteria to control cooperative activities and adapts their phenotypes to the biotic environment, resulting, e.g., in cell–cell adhesion or biofilm formation.

All animals and plants form associations with microorganisms, including protists, bacteria, archaea, fungi, and viruses. In the ocean, animal–microbial relationships were historically explored in single host–symbiont systems. However, new explorations into the diversity of microorganisms associating with diverse marine animal hosts is moving the field into studies that address interactions between the animal host and the multi-member microbiome. The potential for microbiomes to influence the health, physiology, behaviour, and ecology of marine animals could alter current understandings of how marine animals adapt to change. This applies to especially the growing climate-related and anthropogenic-induced changes already impacting the ocean and the phytoplankton microbiome in it. The plant microbiome plays key roles in plant health and food production and has received significant attention in recent years. Plants live in association with diverse microbial consortia, referred to as the plant microbiota, living both inside (the endosphere) and outside (the episphere) plant tissues. They play important roles in the ecology and physiology of plants. The core plant microbiome is thought to contain keystone microbial taxa essential for plant health and for the fitness of the plant holobiont. Likewise, the mammalian gut microbiome has emerged as a key regulator of host physiology, and coevolution between host and microbial lineages has played a key role in the adaptation of mammals to their diverse lifestyles.

Microbiome research originated in microbiology in the seventeenth century. The development of new techniques and equipment boosted microbiological research and caused paradigm shifts in understanding health and disease. The development of the first microscopes allowed the discovery of a new, unknown world and led to the identification of microorganisms. Infectious diseases became the earliest focus of interest and research. However, only a small proportion of microorganisms are associated with disease or pathogenicity. The overwhelming majority of microbes are essential for healthy ecosystem functioning and are known for beneficial interactions with other microbes and organisms. The concept that microorganisms exist as single cells began to change as it became increasingly obvious that microbes occur within complex assemblages in which species interactions and communication are critical. Discovery of DNA, the development of sequencing technologies, PCR, and cloning techniques enabled the investigation of microbial communities using cultivation-independent approaches. Further paradigm shifts occurred at the beginning of this century and still continue, as new sequencing technologies and accumulated sequence data have highlighted both the ubiquity of microbial communities in association within higher organisms and the critical roles of microbes in human, animal, and plant health. These have revolutionised microbial ecology. The analysis of genomes and metagenomes in a high-throughput manner now provides highly effective methods for researching the functioning of individual microorganisms as well as whole microbial communities in natural habitats.

== Background ==
=== History ===
Microbiome research originated in microbiology and started back in the seventeenth century. The development of new techniques and equipment has boosted microbiological research and caused paradigm shifts in understanding health and disease. Since infectious diseases have affected human populations throughout most of history, medical microbiology was the earliest focus of research and public interest. Additionally, food microbiology is an old field of empirical applications. The development of the first microscopes allowed the discovery of a new, unknown world and led to the identification of microorganisms.

Paradigm shift

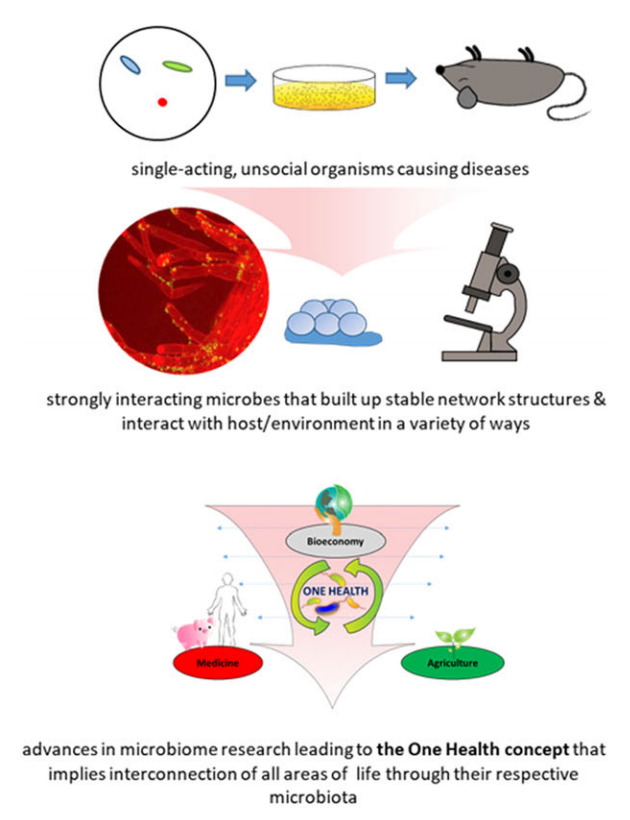
Shift of paradigm from microbes as unsocial organisms causing diseases to a holistic view of microorganisms as the centre of the One Health Concept interconnecting all areas of human lives.

Access to the previously invisible world opened the eyes and the minds of the researchers of the seventeenth century. Antonie van Leeuwenhoek investigated diverse bacteria of various shapes, fungi, and protozoa, which he called animalcules, mainly from water, mud, and dental plaque samples, and discovered biofilms as a first indication of microorganisms interacting within complex communities. Robert Koch's explanation of the origin of human and animal diseases as a consequence of microbial infection and development of the concept of pathogenicity was an important milestone in microbiology. These findings shifted the focus of the research community and the public on the role of microorganisms as disease-forming agents that needed to be eliminated.

However, comprehensive research over the past century has shown only a small proportion of microorganisms are associated with disease or pathogenicity. The overwhelming majority of microbes are essential for ecosystem functioning and known for beneficial interactions with other microbes as well as macroorganisms. In fact, maintaining a healthy microbiome is essential for human health and may be a target for new therapeutics. At the end of the nineteenth century, microbial ecology started with the pioneering work by Martinus W. Beijerinck and Sergei Winogradsky. The newly established science of environmental microbiology resulted in another paradigm shift: microorganisms are everywhere in natural environments, often associated with hosts and, for the first time, beneficial effects on their hosts were reported.

Subsequently, the concept that microorganisms exist as single cells began to change as it became increasingly obvious that microbes occur within complex assemblages in which species interactions and communication are critical to population dynamics and functional activities. Discovery of DNA, the development of sequencing technologies, PCR, and cloning techniques enabled the investigation of microbial communities using cultivation-independent, DNA and RNA-based approaches.

A further important step was the introduction of phylogenetic markers such as the 16S rRNA gene for microbial community analysis by Carl Woese and George E. Fox in 1977. Nowadays biologists can barcode bacteria, archaea, fungi, algae, and protists in their natural habitats, e.g., by targeting their 16S and 18S rRNA genes, internal transcribed spacer (ITS), or, alternatively, specific functional regions of genes coding for specific enzymes.

Another major paradigm shift was initiated at the beginning of this century and continues through today, as new sequencing technologies and accumulated sequence data have highlighted both the ubiquity of microbial communities in association within higher organisms and the critical roles of microbes in human, animal, and plant health. These new possibilities have revolutionized microbial ecology, because the analysis of genomes and metagenomes in a high-throughput manner provides efficient methods for addressing the functional potential of individual microorganisms as well as of whole communities in their natural habitats. Multiomics technologies including metatranscriptome, metaproteome and metabolome approaches now provide detailed information on microbial activities in the environment. Based on the rich foundation of data, the cultivation of microbes, which was often ignored or underestimated over the last thirty years, has gained new importance, and high throughput culturomics is now an important part of the toolbox to study microbiomes. The high potential and power of combining multiple "omics" techniques to analyze host-microbe interactions are highlighted in several reviews.

Timeline of microbiome research from the seventeenth century to the present
Technological advances	Year	Scientific discoveries	Scientists	Sources
microscopy	1670	discovery of microorganisms	Antonie van Leeuwenhoek father of microbiology	
microscopy	1729	classification of plants and fungi	Pier Antonio Micheli	
microscopy	1796	first vaccination	Edward Jenner	
microscopy	1837	yeast in alcoholic fermentation	Charles de la Tour; Friedrich Kützing; Theodor Schwann	
cultivation based approaches	1855 -1857	pasteurisation, fermentation, vaccine against rabies	Louis Pasteur	
cultivation based approaches	1875	foundation for bacteriological taxonomy	Ferdinand Cohn	
cultivation based approaches	1884	Koch's postulates	Robert Koch	
cultivation based approaches	1888	start of microbial ecology nitrification, nitrogen-fixation, soil microbiology, life cycle	Sergei Winogradsky	
cultivation based approaches	1892	tobacco mosaic virus extraction from leaves	Dmitri Ivanovsky; Martinus Beijerinck	
cultivation based approaches	1904	concept of the rhizosphere	Lorenz Hiltner	
fluorescence microscopy	1911			
mass spectrometry	1919		Francis Aston	
mass spectrometry	1922	chemolithotrophy	Sergei Winogradsky	
mass spectrometry	1928	transformation of genetic information to offspring	Frederick Griffith	
mass spectrometry	1928	discovery of antibiotics	Alexander Fleming	
scanning electron microscopy	1931 -1938			
scanning electron microscopy	1944	DNA as carrier of genetic information	Oswald Avery; Colin Macleod; Maclyn McCarty	
scanning electron microscopy	1946	"sexual reproduction" of bacteria	Joshua Lederberg; Edward Tatum	
scanning electron microscopy	1953	3D-double-helix structure	James Watson; Francis Crick	
in situ hybridisation iSIS	1969			
HPLC	1970s	central dogma of molecular biology	Francis Crick	
DNA array/colony hybridisation	1975			
Sanger sequencing	1977		Frederick Sanger	
Sanger sequencing	1977	discovery of Archaea	Carl Woese; George E. Fox	
Sanger sequencing	1977	first full genome sequence of a virus		
Sanger sequencing	1982	discovery of prions	Stanley B. Prusiner	
PCR technique	1983			
fluorescence in situ hybridisation	1988			
fluorescence in situ hybridisation	1991	theory of the holobiont	Eugene Rosenberg; Ilana Zilber-Rosenberg	
quantitative real-time PCR	1993			
quantitative real-time PCR	1993	the complex structure of biofilms	Hans-Curt Flemming	
full cycle rRNA approach	1995			
full cycle rRNA approach	1995	first full genome sequencing of Haemophilus influenzae	Craig Venter and colleagues	
next-generation sequencing	2005			
next-generation sequencing	2005	HMP: Human Microbiome Project		
third-generation sequencing	2008			
third-generation sequencing	2008	TerraGenome: Reference Soil Metagenome Project		
third-generation sequencing	2010	Earth Microbiome Project		

=== Etymology ===
The word microbiome (from the Greek micro meaning "small" and bíos meaning "life") was first used by J.L. Mohr in 1952 in The Scientific Monthly to mean the microorganisms found in a specific environment.

=== Definitions ===
Microbial communities have commonly been defined as the collection of microorganisms living together. More specifically, microbial communities are defined as multi-species assemblages, in which (micro) organisms interact with each other in a contiguous environment. In 1988, Whipps and colleagues working on the ecology of rhizosphere microorganisms provided the first definition of the term microbiome. They described the microbiome as a combination of the words micro and biome, naming a "characteristic microbial community" in a "reasonably well-defined habitat which has distinct physio-chemical properties" as their "theatre of activity". This definition represents a substantial advancement of the definition of a microbial community, as it defines a microbial community with distinct properties and functions and its interactions with its environment, resulting in the formation of specific ecological niches.

However, many other microbiome definitions have been published in recent decades. By 2020 the most cited definition was by Lederberg, and described microbiomes within an ecological context as a community of commensal, symbiotic, and pathogenic microorganisms within a body space or other environment. Marchesi and Ravel focused in their definition on the genomes and microbial (and viral) gene expression patterns and proteomes in a given environment and its prevailing biotic and abiotic conditions. All these definitions imply that general concepts of macro-ecology could be easily applied to microbe-microbe as well as to microbe-host interactions. However, the extent to which these concepts, developed for macro-eukaryotes, can be applied to prokaryotes with their different lifestyles regarding dormancy, variation of phenotype, and horizontal gene transfer as well as to micro-eukaryotes is not quite clear. This raises the challenge of considering an entirely novel body of conceptual ecology models and theory for microbiome ecology, particularly in relation to the diverse hierarchies of interactions of microbes with one another and with the host biotic and abiotic environments. Many current definitions fail to capture this complexity and describe the term microbiome as encompassing the genomes of microorganisms only.

Microbiome definitions
Definition type	Examples
Ecological	Definitions based on ecology describe the microbiome following the concepts derived from the ecology of multicellular organisms. The main issue here is that the theories from the macro-ecology do not always fit the rules in the microbial world.
Ecological	"A convenient ecological framework in which to examine biocontrol systems is that of the microbiome. This may be defined as a characteristic microbial community occupying a reasonably well-defined habitat which has distinct physio-chemical properties. The term thus not only refers to the microorganisms involved but also encompasses their theatre of activity".; "This term refers to the entire habitat, including the microorganisms (bacteria, archaea, lower and higher eukaryotes, and viruses), their genomes (i.e., genes), and the surrounding environmental conditions. This definition is based on that of "biome," the biotic and abiotic factors of given environments. Others in the field limit the definition of microbiome to the collection of genes and genomes of members of a microbiota. It is argued that this is the definition of metagenome, which combined with the environment constitutes the microbiome. The microbiome is characterized by the application of one or combinations of metagenomics, metabonomics, metatranscriptomics, and metaproteomics combined with clinical or environmental metadata".; "others use the term microbiome to mean all the microbes of a community, and in particular, for the plant microbiome, those microbial communities associated with the plant which can live, thrive, and interact with different tissues such as roots, shoots, leaves, flowers, and seeds".; "Ecological community of commensal, symbiotic and pathogenic microorganisms within a body space or other environment".
Organisms/host-dependent	The host-dependent definitions are based on the microbial interactions with the host. The main gaps here concern the question whether the microbial-host interaction data gained from one host can be transferred to another. The understanding of coevolution and selection in the host-dependent definitions is also underrepresented.
Organisms/host-dependent	"A community of microorganisms (such as bacteria, fungi, and viruses) that inhabit a particular environment and especially the collection of microorganisms living in or on the human body".; "Human Microbiome Project (HMP): [...] The Human Microbiome is the collection of all the microorganisms living in association with the human body. These communities consist of a variety of microorganisms including eukaryotes, archaea, bacteria and viruses".
Genomic/ method-driven	There is a variety of microbiome definitions available that are driven by the methods applied. Mostly, these definitions rely on DNA sequence-based analysis and describe microbiome as a collective genome of microorganisms in a specific environment. The main bottleneck here is that every new available technology will result in a need for a new definition.
Genomic/ method-driven	"The collective genomes of microorganisms inhabiting a particular environment and especially the human body".; "The microbiome comprises all of the genetic material within a microbiota (the entire collection of microorganisms in a specific niche, such as the human gut). This can also be referred to as the metagenome of the microbiota".; "Microbiome is a term that describes the genome of all the microorganisms, symbiotic and pathogenic, living in and on all vertebrates. The gut microbiome consists of the collective genome of microbes inhabiting the gut including bacteria, archaea, viruses, and fungi".; "Different approaches to define the population provide different information. a | Microbiota: 16S rRNA surveys are used to taxonomically identify the microorganisms in the environment. b | Metagenome: the genes and genomes of the microbiota, including plasmids, highlighting the genetic potential of the population. c | Microbiome: the genes and genomes of the microbiota, as well as the products of the microbiota and the host environment".; "Totality of genomes of a microbiota. Often used to describe the entity of microbial traits (=functions) encoded by a microbiota."
Combined	There are some microbiome definitions available that fit several categories with their advantages and disadvantages.
Combined	"A microbiome is the ecological community of commensal, symbiotic, and pathogenic microorganisms that literally share our body space."; "The microbiome is the sum of the microbes and their genomic elements in a particular environment".; "The genes and genomes of the microbiota, as well as the products of the microbiota and the host environment".

In 2020, a panel of international experts, organised by the EU-funded MicrobiomeSupport project, published the results of their deliberations on the definition of the microbiome. The panel was composed of about 40 leaders from diverse microbiome areas, and about one hundred further experts from around the world contributed through an online survey. They proposed a definition of the microbiome based on a revival of what they characterised as the "compact, clear, and comprehensive description of the term" as originally provided by Whipps et al. in 1988, amended with a set of recommendations considering subsequent technological developments and research findings. They clearly separate the terms microbiome and microbiota and provide a comprehensive discussion considering the composition of microbiota, the heterogeneity and dynamics of microbiomes in time and space, the stability and resilience of microbial networks, the definition of core microbiomes, and functionally relevant keystone species as well as co-evolutionary principles of microbe-host and inter-species interactions within the microbiome.

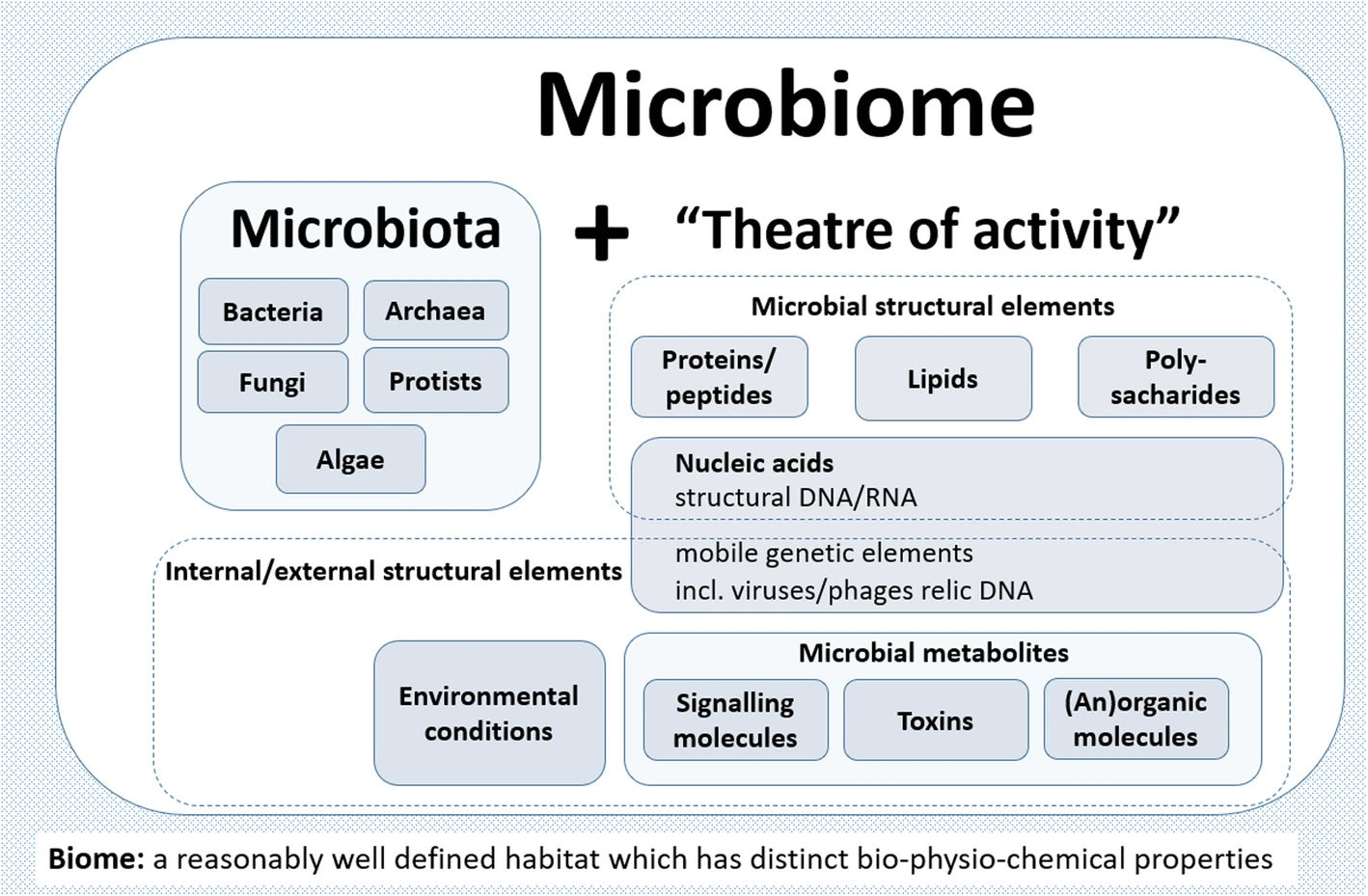
The term microbiome encompasses both the microbiota (community of microorganisms) and their "theatre of activity" (structural elements, metabolites/signal molecules, and the surrounding environmental conditions.

The panel extended the Whipps et al. definition, which contains all important points that are valid even 30 years after its publication in 1988, by two explanatory paragraphs differentiating the terms microbiome and microbiota and pronouncing its dynamic character, as follows:

- The microbiome is defined as a characteristic microbial community occupying a reasonable well-defined habitat which has distinct physio-chemical properties. The microbiome not only refers to the microorganisms involved but also encompass their theatre of activity, which results in the formation of specific ecological niches. The microbiome, which forms a dynamic and interactive micro-ecosystem prone to change in time and scale, is integrated in macro-ecosystems including eukaryotic hosts, and here crucial for their functioning and health.

- The microbiota consists of the assembly of microorganisms belonging to different kingdoms (prokaryotes (bacteria, archaea), eukaryotes (algae, protozoa, fungi etc), while "their theatre of activity" includes microbial structures, metabolites, mobile genetic elements (such as transposons, phages, and viruses), and relic DNA embedded in the environmental conditions of the habitat.

== Membership ==
=== Microbiota ===
The microbiota comprises all living members forming the microbiome. Most microbiome researchers agree bacteria, archaea, fungi, algae, and small protists should be considered as members of the microbiome. The integration of phages, viruses, plasmids, and mobile genetic elements is a more controversial issue in the definition of the microbiome. There is also no clear consensus as to whether extracellular DNA derived from dead cells, so-called "relic DNA", belongs to the microbiome. Relic DNA can be up to 40% of the sequenced DNA in soil, and was up to 33% of the total bacterial DNA on average in a broader analysis of habitats with the highest proportion of 80% in some samples. Despite its omnipresence and abundance, relic DNA had a minimal effect on estimates of taxonomic and phylogenetic diversity.

When it comes to the use of specific terms, a clear differentiation between microbiome and microbiota helps to avoid the controversy concerning the members of a microbiome. Microbiota is usually defined as the assemblage of living microorganisms present in a defined environment. As phages, viruses, plasmids, prions, viroids, and free DNA are usually not considered as living microorganisms, they do not belong to the microbiota.

The term microbiome, as it was originally postulated by Whipps and coworkers, includes not only the community of the microorganisms but also their "theatre of activity". The latter involves the whole spectrum of molecules produced by the microorganisms, including their structural elements (nucleic acids, proteins, lipids, polysaccharides), metabolites (signalling molecules, toxins, organic, and inorganic molecules), and molecules produced by coexisting hosts and structured by the surrounding environmental conditions. Therefore, all mobile genetic elements, such as phages, viruses, and "relic" and extracellular DNA, should be included in the term microbiome, but are not a part of microbiota. The term microbiome is also sometimes confused with the metagenome. Metagenome is, however, clearly defined as a collection of genomes and genes from the members of a microbiota.

Microbiome studies sometimes focus on the behaviour of a specific group of microbiota, generally in relation to or justified by a clear hypothesis. More and more terms like bacteriome, archaeome, mycobiome, or virome have started appearing in the scientific literature, but these terms do not refer to biomes (a regional ecosystem with a distinct assemblage of (micro) organisms, and physical environment often reflecting a certain climate and soil) as the microbiome itself. Consequently, it would be better to use the original terms (bacterial, archaeal, or fungal community). In contrast to the microbiota, which can be studied separately, the microbiome is always composed by all members, which interact with each other, live in the same habitat, and form their ecological niche together. The well-established term virome is derived from virus and genome and is used to describe viral shotgun metagenomes consisting of a collection of nucleic acids associated with a particular ecosystem or holobiont. Viral metagenomes can be suggested as a semantically and scientifically better term.

=== Networks ===
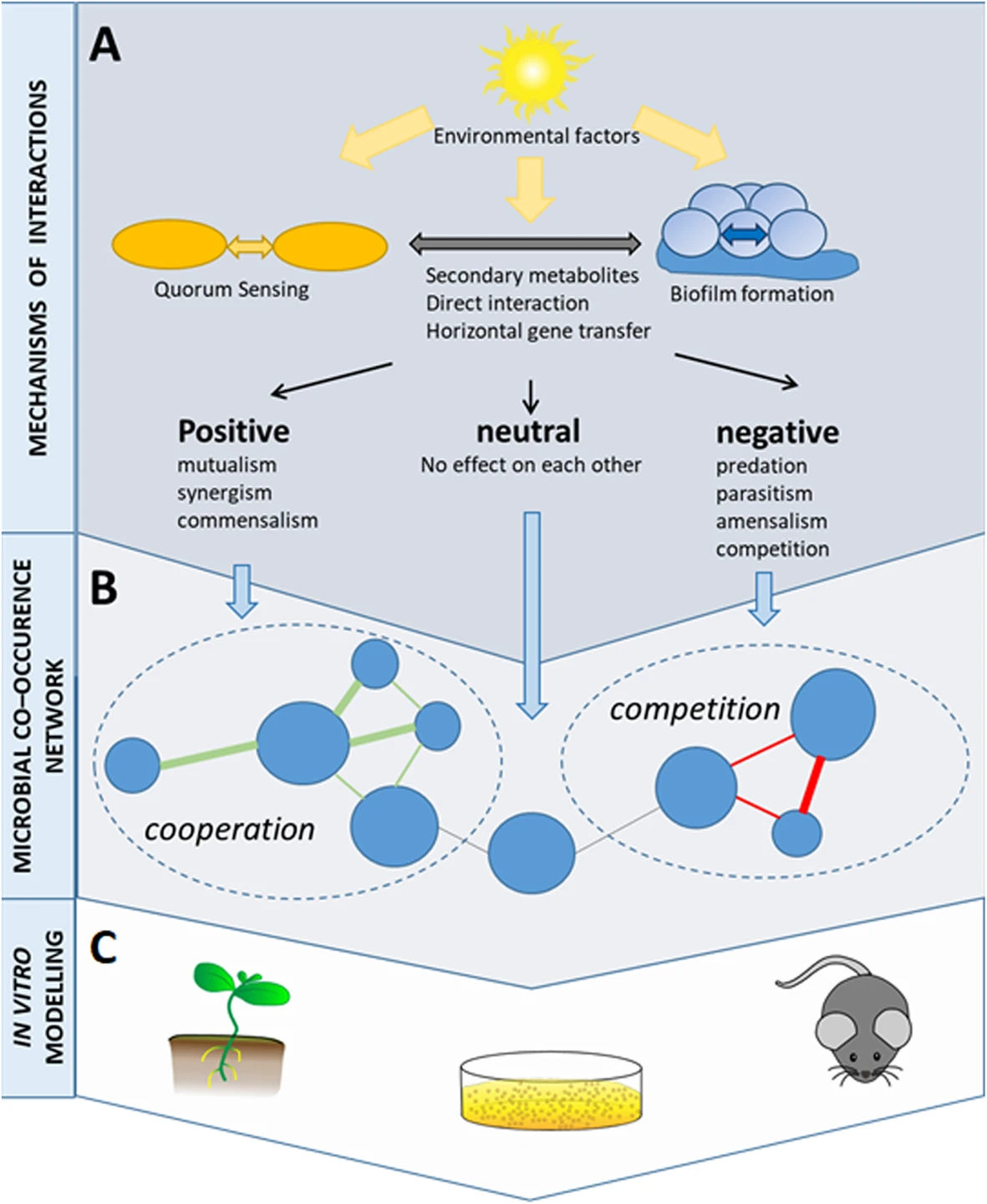
Co-occurrence networks help visualising microbial interactions
Nodes usually represent taxa of microorganisms, and edges represent statistically significant associations between nodes.
–––––––––––––––––––––––––––
Testing of the hypotheses resulted from the network analyses is required for a comprehensive study of microbial interactions.

Microbes interact with one another, and these symbiotic interactions have diverse consequences for microbial fitness, population dynamics, and functional capacities within the microbiome. The microbial interactions can either be between microorganisms of the same species or between different species, genera, families, and domains of life. The interactions can be separated into positive, negative, and neutral types. Positive interactions include mutualism, synergism, and commensalism. Negative interactions include amensalism, predation, parasitism, antagonism, and competition. Neutral interactions are interactions where there is no observed effect on the functional capacities or fitness of interacting species microbial life strategy concepts.

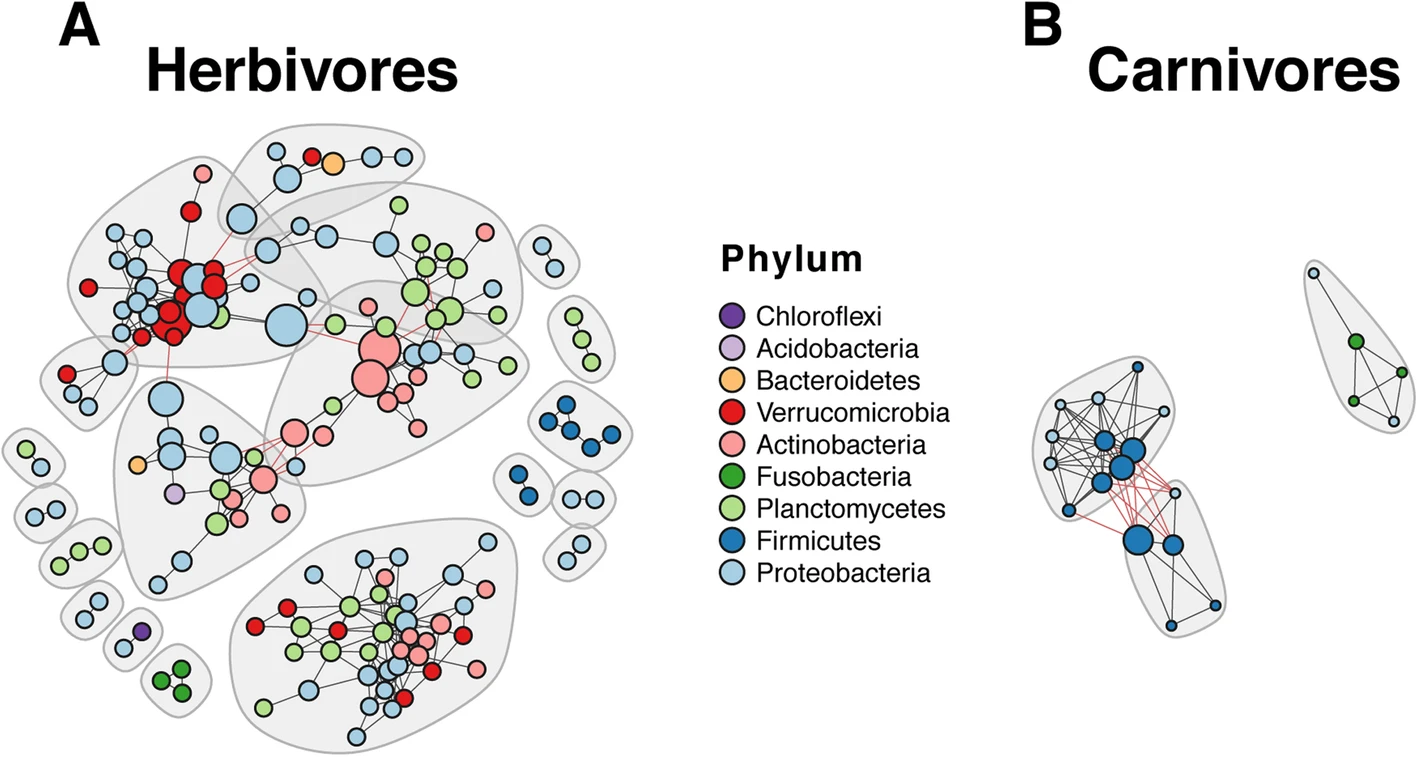
Co-occurrence networks show difference in gut microbiota between herbivorous and carnivorous cichlids
Nodes coloured according to phylum. The herbivore network has higher complexity (156 nodes and 339 edges) compared to the carnivore network (21 nodes and 70 edges).

Microbiomes exhibit different adaptive strategies. Oligotrophs are organisms that can live in an environment offering very low levels of nutrients, particularly carbon. They are characterised by slow growth, low rates of metabolism, and generally low population density. Oligotrophic environments include deep oceanic sediments, caves, glacial and polar ice, deep subsurface soil, aquifers, ocean waters, and leached soils. In contrast are the copiotrophs, which thrive in much higher carbon concentrations, and do well in high organic substrate conditions such as sewage lagoons.

In addition to oligotrophic and copiotrophic strategists, the competitor–stress tolerator–ruderals framework can influence the outcomes of interactions. For example, microorganisms competing for the same source can also benefit from each other when competing for the same compound at different trophic levels. Stability of a complex microbial ecosystem depends on trophic interactions for the same substrate at different concentration levels. As of 2020 microbial social adaptations in nature have been understudied. Here molecular markers can provide insight into social adaptations by supporting the theories, e.g., of altruists and cheaters in native microbiomes.

=== Coevolution ===
Shift in the understanding of the microbial-host coevolution

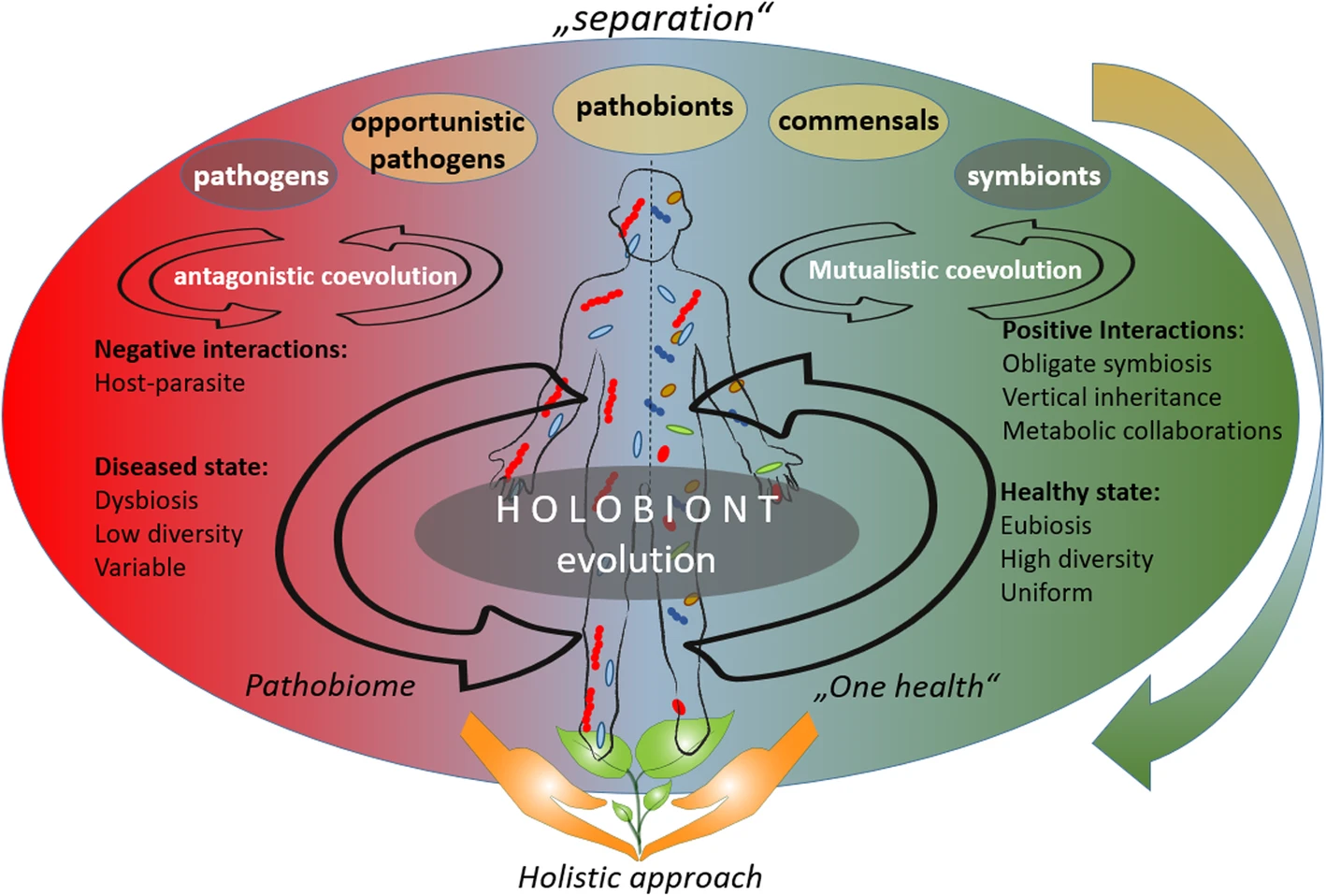
from "separation" theories to a holistic approach
In a holistic approach, the hosts and their associated microbiota are assumed to have coevolved with each other

According to the "separation" approach, the microorganisms can be divided into pathogens, neutral, and symbionts, depending on their interaction with their host. The coevolution between host and its associated microbiota may be accordingly described as antagonistic (based on negative interactions) or mutualistic (based on positive interactions).

As of 2020, the emergence in publications about opportunistic pathogens and pathobionts has produced a shift towards a holistic approach in the coevolutions theory. The holistic approach sees the host and its associated microbiota as one unit (the so-called holobiont), that coevolves as one entity. According to the holistic approach, holobiont's disease state is linked to dysbiosis, low diversity of the associated microbiota, and their variability: a so-called pathobiome state. The healthy state, on the other hand, is accompanied with eubiosis, high diversity, and uniformity of the respective microbiota.

== Types ==
=== Terrestrial ===
==== Plant ====
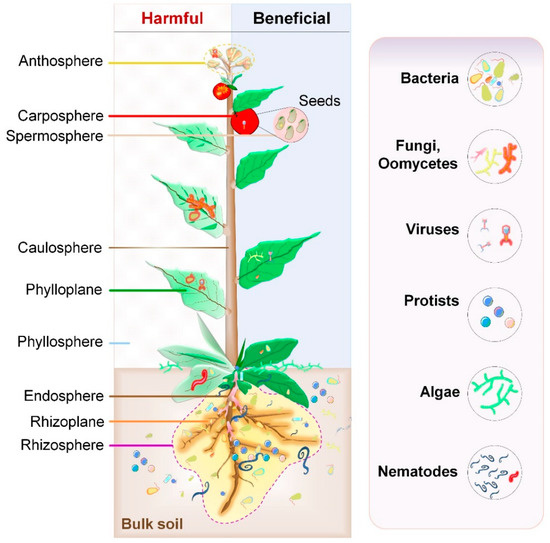
Microbiomes in the plant ecosystem

The plant microbiome plays roles in plant health and food production and has received significant attention in recent years. Plants live in association with diverse microbial consortia. These microbes, referred to as the plant's microbiota, live both inside (the endosphere) and outside (the episphere) of plant tissues, and play important roles in the ecology and physiology of plants. "The core plant microbiome is thought to comprise keystone microbial taxa that are important for plant fitness and established through evolutionary mechanisms of selection and enrichment of microbial taxa containing essential functions genes for the fitness of the plant holobiont".

Plant microbiomes are shaped by both factors related to the plant itself, such as genotype, organ, species and health status, as well as factors related to the plant's environment, such as management, land use and climate. The health status of a plant has been reported in some studies to be reflected by or linked to its microbiome.

Plant and plant-associated microbiota colonise different niches on and inside the plant tissue. All the above-ground plant parts together, called the phyllosphere, are a continuously evolving habitat due to ultraviolet (UV) radiation and altering climatic conditions. It is primarily composed of leaves. Below-ground plant parts, mainly roots, are generally influenced by soil properties. Harmful interactions affect the plant growth through pathogenic activities of some microbiota members. On the other hand, beneficial microbial interactions promote plant growth.

The addition of synthetic nitrogen fertiliser may have little impact on soil microbiome structure or composition, but drastically reduces the microbiome network connectivity.

==== Animal ====
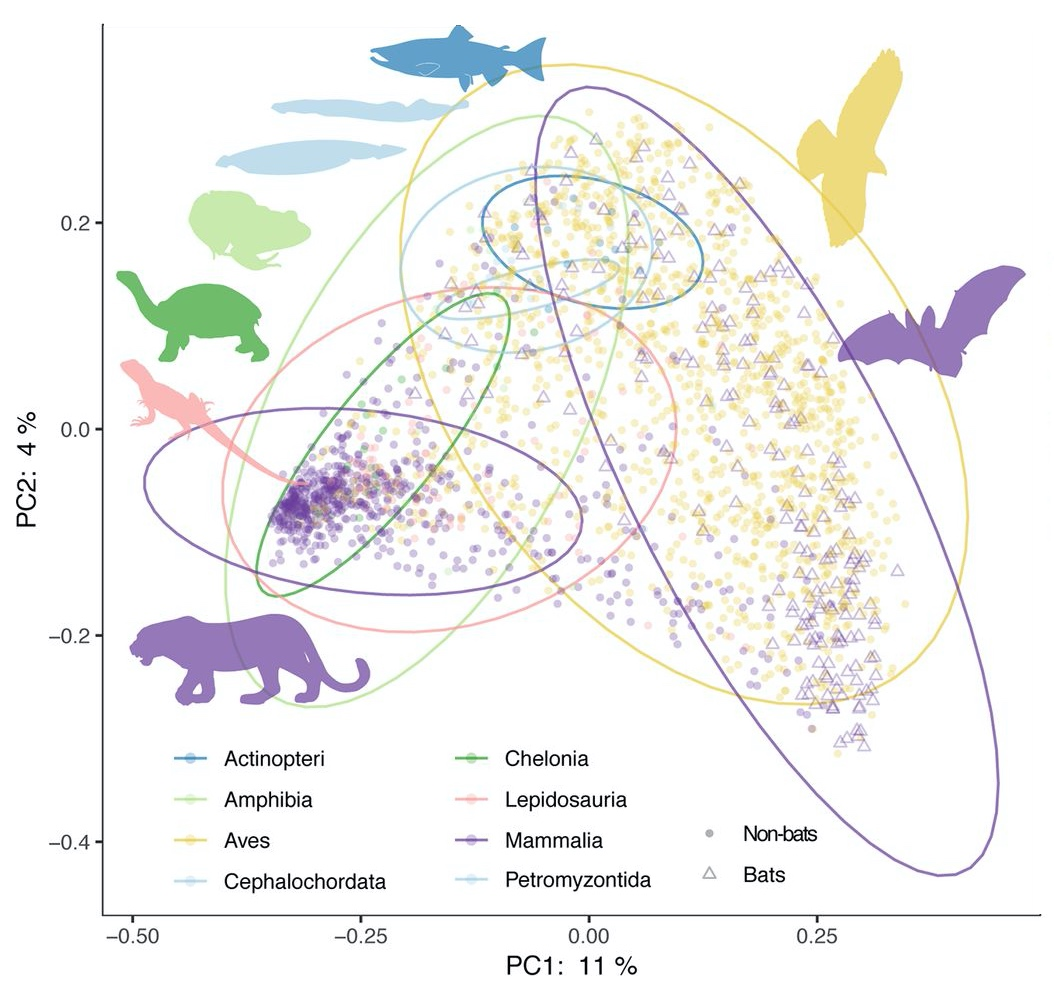
Principal coordinate analysis of animal gut microbiome data

The mammalian gut microbiome has emerged as a key regulator of host physiology, and coevolution between host and microbial lineages has played a key role in the adaptation of mammals to their diverse lifestyles. Diet, especially herbivory, is an important correlate of microbial diversity in mammals. Most mammalian microbiomes are also strongly correlated with host phylogeny, despite profound shifts in diet. This suggests host factors that themselves change across host phylogeny, such as gut physiology, play an important role in structuring the gut microbiomes across mammals. The vertebrate adaptive immune system is even speculated to have evolved as just such a factor for selective maintenance of symbiotic homeostasis.

The importance of phylogeny-correlated factors to the diversity of vertebrate microbiomes more generally is still poorly understood. Phylosymbiosis, or the observation that more closely related host species have more similar microbiomes, has been described in a number of nonmammalian taxa. Other analyses have found substantial variation in phylosymbiotic signals among mammalian taxa, sometimes with conflicting results. The presence of a robust phylosymbiotic correlation implies that host factors control microbial assembly. Even if the specific mechanisms are unknown, variation in the strength or presence of a measurable phylosymbiotic signal across host phylogeny could prove useful for identifying such mechanisms through comparative studies. However, as of 2020 most studies have focused on just a few taxa at a time, and variable methods for both surveying the microbiome and measuring phylosymbiosis and host specificity (or the restriction of microbes to specific host lineages) have made generalisations difficult.

Without broader evolutionary context, it is unclear how universally conserved patterns of host-microbe phylosymbiosis actually are. Growing evidence indicates that the strong patterns identified in mammals are the exception rather than the rule in vertebrates. Meta-analyses of fish and birds have failed to detect the strength of correlations to diet and phylogeny reported in mammals. A recent analysis of samples from more than 100 vertebrate species also found the strength of phylogenetic correlation to be much higher in mammals than in birds, reptiles, amphibians, or fish. It is increasingly appreciated in nonvertebrate animals that fundamental aspects of the host's relationship to its symbiotic community can change drastically between taxa: many insects depend entirely on microbes for key metabolites, while others seem to be devoid of resident gut microbes.

==== Human ====
The human microbiome is the aggregate of all microbiota that reside on or within human tissues and biofluids along with the corresponding anatomical sites in which they reside, including the skin, mammary glands, seminal fluid, uterus, ovarian follicles, lung, saliva, oral mucosa, conjunctiva, biliary tract, and gastrointestinal tract. Types of human microbiota include bacteria, archaea, fungi, protists and viruses. Though micro-animals can also live on the human body, they are typically excluded from this definition. In the context of genomics, the term human microbiome is sometimes used to refer to the collective genomes of resident microorganisms; the term human metagenome has the same meaning.

Humans are colonised by many microorganisms, with approximately the same order of magnitude of non-human cells as human cells. Some microorganisms that colonize humans are commensal, meaning they co-exist without harming or benefiting humans; others have a mutualistic relationship with their human hosts. Conversely, some non-pathogenic microorganisms can harm human hosts via the metabolites they produce, like trimethylamine, which the human body converts to trimethylamine N-oxide via FMO3-mediated oxidation. Certain microorganisms perform tasks that are known to be useful to the human host, but the role of most of them is not well understood. Those that are expected to be present, and that under normal circumstances do not cause disease, are sometimes deemed normal flora or normal microbiota.

The Human Microbiome Project (HMP) took on the project of sequencing the genome of the human microbiota, focusing particularly on the microbiota that normally inhabit the skin, mouth, nose, digestive tract, and vagina. It reached a milestone in 2012 when it published its initial results.

=== Marine ===
Marine animal host-microbiome relationship

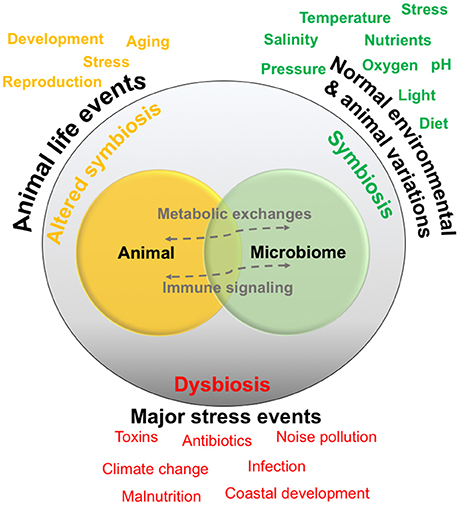
Relationships are generally thought to exist in a symbiotic state, and are normally exposed to environmental and animal-specific factors that may cause natural variations. Some events may change the relationship into a functioning but altered symbiotic state, whereas extreme stress events may cause dysbiosis or a breakdown of the relationship and interactions.

All animals on Earth form associations with microorganisms, including protists, bacteria, archaea, fungi, and viruses. In the ocean, animal–microbial relationships were historically explored in single host–symbiont systems. However, new explorations into the diversity of microorganisms associating with diverse marine animal hosts is moving the field into studies that address interactions between the animal host and a more multi-member microbiome. The potential for microbiomes to influence the health, physiology, behavior, and ecology of marine animals could alter current understandings of how marine animals adapt to change, and especially the growing climate-related and anthropogenic-induced changes already impacting the ocean environment.

The microbiomes of diverse marine animals are currently under study, from simplistic organisms including sponges and ctenophores to more complex organisms such as sea squirts and sharks.

The relationship between the Hawaiian bobtail squid and the bioluminescent bacterium Aliivibrio fischeri is one of the best studied symbiotic relationships in the sea and is a choice system for general symbiosis research. This relationship has provided insight into fundamental processes in animal-microbial symbioses, and especially biochemical interactions and signaling between the host and bacterium.

The gutless marine oligochaete worm Olavius algarvensis is another relatively well-studied marine host to microbes. These three centimetre long worms reside within shallow marine sediments of the Mediterranean Sea. The worms do not contain a mouth or a digestive or excretory system, but are instead nourished with the help of a suite of extracellular bacterial endosymbionts that reside upon coordinated use of sulfur present in the environment. This system has benefited from some of the most sophisticated 'omics and visualization tools. For example, multi-labeled probing has improved visualization of the microbiome and transcriptomics and proteomics have been applied to examine host–microbiome interactions, including energy transfer between the host and microbes and recognition of the consortia by the worm's innate immune system. The major strength of this system is that it does offer the ability to study host–microbiome interactions with a low diversity microbial consortium, and it also offers a number of host and microbial genomic resources

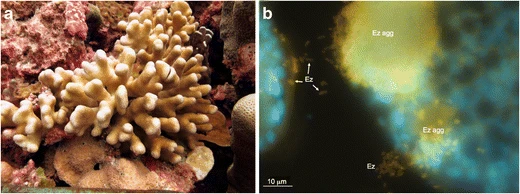
Stylophora pistillata coral colony and the bacteria Endozoicomonas (Ez) probed cells (yellow) within the tentacles of S. pistillata residing in aggregates (Ez agg) as well as just outside the aggregate (b).

Corals are one of the more common examples of an animal host whose symbiosis with microalgae can turn to dysbiosis, and is visibly detected as bleaching. Coral microbiomes have been examined in a variety of studies, which demonstrate how variations in the ocean environment, most notably temperature, light, and inorganic nutrients, affect the abundance and performance of the microalgal symbionts, as well as calcification and physiology of the host. Studies have also suggested that resident bacteria, archaea, and fungi additionally contribute to nutrient and organic matter cycling within the coral, with viruses also possibly playing a role in structuring the composition of these members, thus providing one of the first glimpses at a multi-domain marine animal symbiosis. The gammaproteobacterium Endozoicomonas is emerging as a central member of the coral's microbiome, with flexibility in its lifestyle. Given the recent mass bleaching occurring on reefs, corals will likely continue to be a useful and popular system for symbiosis and dysbiosis research.

Sponges are common members of the ocean's diverse benthic habitats and their abundance and ability to filter large volumes of seawater have led to the awareness that these organisms play critical roles in influencing benthic and pelagic processes in the ocean. They are one of the oldest lineages of animals, and have a relatively simple body plan that commonly associates with bacteria, archaea, algal protists, fungi, and viruses. Sponge microbiomes are composed of specialists and generalists, and complexity of their microbiome appears to be shaped by host phylogeny. Studies have shown that the sponge microbiome contributes to nitrogen cycling in the oceans, especially through the oxidation of ammonia by archaea and bacteria. Most recently, microbial symbionts of tropical sponges were shown to produce and store polyphosphate granules, perhaps enabling the host to survive periods of phosphate depletion in oligotrophic marine environments. The microbiomes of some sponge species do appear to change in community structure in response to changing environmental conditions, including temperature and ocean acidification, as well as synergistic impacts.

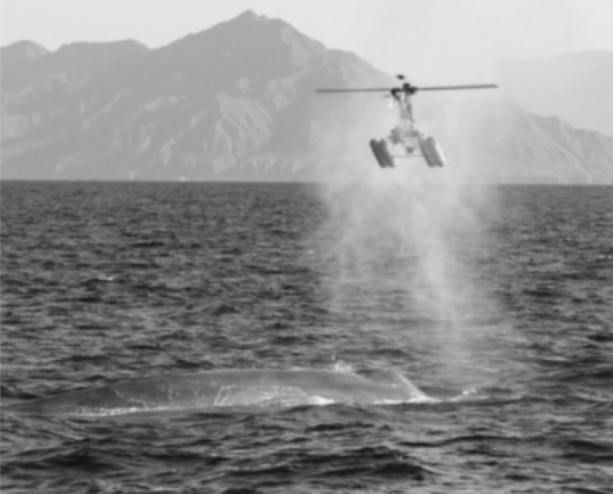
Collecting a sample of blow from a blue whale using a helicopter drone

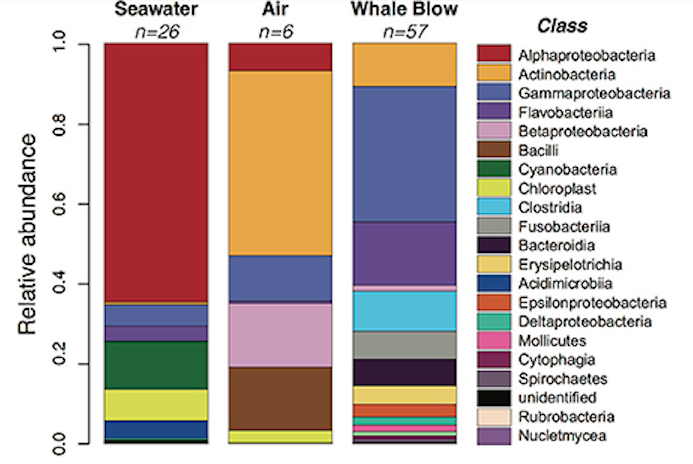
Relative abundance of bacterial classes from whale blow, air and seawater samples.

Cetacean microbiomes can be difficult to assess because of difficulties accessing microbial samples. For example, many whale species are rare and are deep divers. There are different techniques for sampling a cetacean's gut microbiome. The most common is collecting fecal samples from the environment and taking a probe from the center that is non-contaminated. The skin is a barrier protecting marine mammals from the outside world. The epidermal microbiome on the skin is an indicator of how healthy the animal is, and is also an ecological indicator of the state of the surrounding environment. Knowing what the microbiome of the skin of marine mammals looks like under typical conditions allows understanding of how these communities different from free microbial communities found in the sea. Cetaceans are in danger because they are affected by multiple stress factors which make them more vulnerable to various diseases. They have been high susceptibility to airway infections, but little is known about their respiratory microbiome. Sampling the exhaled breath or "blow" of cetaceans can provide an assessment of their state of health. Blow is composed of a mixture of microorganisms and organic material, including lipids, proteins, and cellular debris derived from the linings of the airways which, when released into the relatively cooler outdoor air, condense to form a visible mass of vapor, which can be collected. There are various methods for collecting exhaled breath samples, one of the most recent is through the use of aerial drones. This method provides a safer, quieter, and less invasive alternative and often a cost-effective option for monitoring fauna and flora. Blow samples are taken to the laboratory where the respiratory tract microbiota are amplified and sequenced. The use of aerial drones has been more successful with large cetaceans due to slow swim speeds and larger blow sizes.

== Assessment ==
Currently available methods for studying microbiomes, so-called multi-omics, range from high throughput isolation (culturomics) and visualization (microscopy), to targeting the taxonomic composition (metabarcoding), or addressing the metabolic potential (metabarcoding of functional genes, metagenomics) to analyze microbial activity (metatranscriptomics, metaproteomics, metabolomics). Based on metagenome data, microbial genomes can be reconstructed. While first metagenome-assembled genomes were reconstructed from environmental samples, in recent years, several thousands of bacterial genomes were binned without culturing the organisms behind. For example, 154,723 microbial genomes of the global human microbiome were reconstructed in 2019 from 9,428 metagenomes.

Methods for assessing microbial functioning

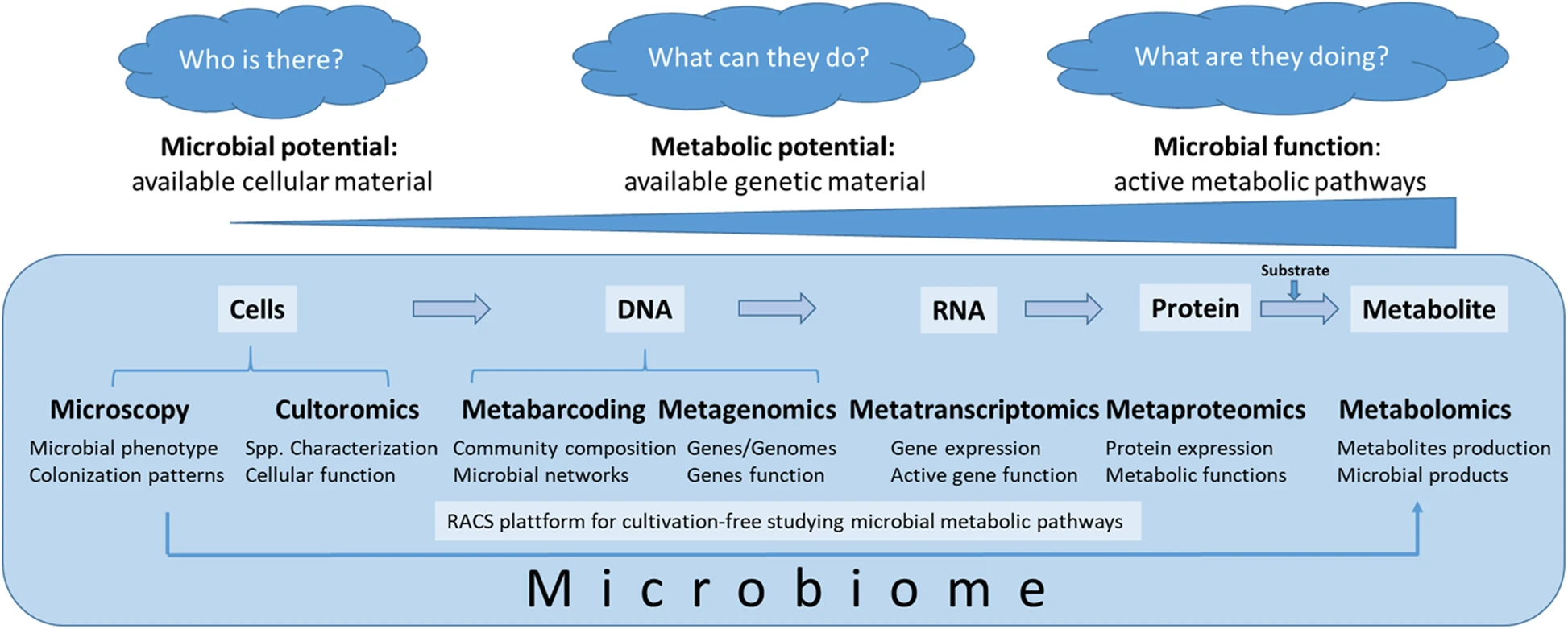
Methods for assessing microbial functioning
Complex microbiome studies cover various areas, starting from the level of complete microbial cells (microscopy, culturomics), followed by the DNA (single cell genomics, metabarcoding, metagenomics), RNA (metatranscriptomics), protein (metaproteomics), and metabolites (metabolomics). In that order, the focus of the studies shifts from the microbial potential (learning about available microbiota in the given habitat) over the metabolic potential (deciphering available genetic material) towards microbial functioning (e.g., the discovery of the active metabolic pathways).

Computational modeling of microbiomes has been used to complement experimental methods for investigating microbial function by utilizing multi-omic data to predict complex inter-species and host-species dynamics. A popular in silico method is to combine metabolic network models of microbial taxa present in a community and use a mathematical modeling strategy such as flux balance analysis to predict the metabolic function of the microbial community at a taxon and community-level.

As of 2020, understanding remains limited due to missing links between the massive availability of microbiome DNA sequence data on the one hand and limited availability of microbial isolates needed to confirm metagenomic predictions of gene function on the other hand. Metagenome data provides a playground for new predictions, yet much more data is needed to strengthen the links between sequence and rigorous functional predictions. This becomes obvious when considering that the replacement of one single amino acid residue by another may lead to a radical functional change, resulting in an incorrect functional assignment to a given gene sequence. Additionally, cultivation of new strains is needed to help identify the large fraction of unknown sequences obtained from metagenomics analyses, which for poorly studied ecosystems can be more than 70%. Depending on the applied method, even in well-studied microbiomes, 40–70% of the annotated genes in fully sequenced microbial genomes have no known or predicted function. As of 2019, 85 of the then established 118 phyla had not had a single species described, presenting a challenge to understanding prokaryotic functional diversity.

The number of prokaryotic phyla may reach hundreds, and archaeal ones are among the least studied. The growing gap between the diversity of Bacteria and Archaea held in pure culture and those detected by molecular methods has led to the proposal to establish a formal nomenclature for not-yet cultured taxa, primarily based on sequence information. According to this proposal, the concept of Candidatus species would be extended to the groups of closely related genome sequences, and their names would be published following established rules of bacterial nomenclature.

Each microbiome system is suited to address different types of questions based on the culturability of microbes, genetic tractability of microbes and host (where relevant), ability to maintain system in laboratory setting, and ability to make host/environment germfree.

Underlying complexity

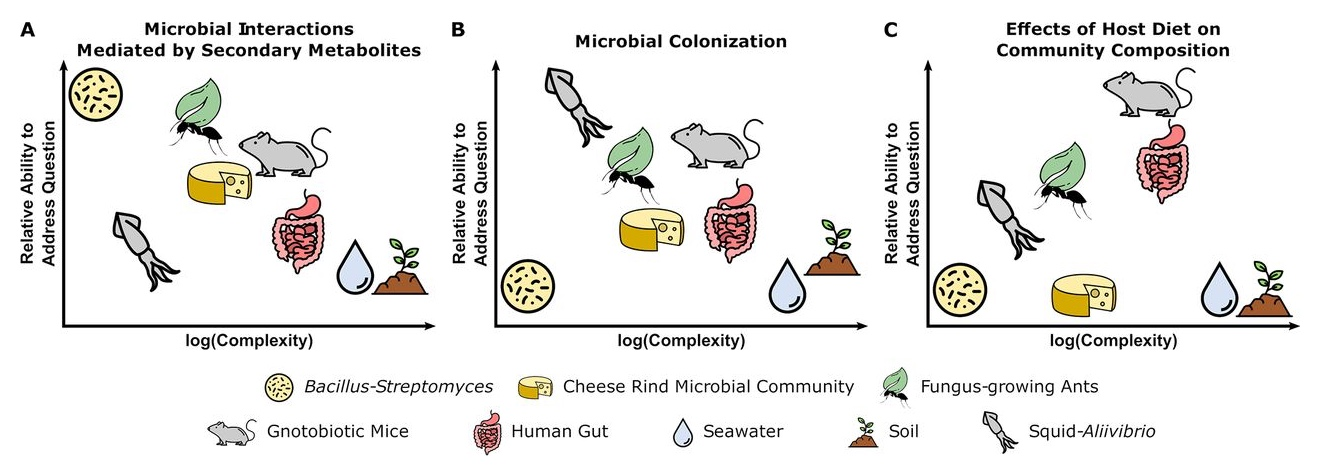
Tradeoffs between experimental questions and complexity of microbiome systems
(A) Pairwise interactions between the soil bacteria Bacillus subtilis and Streptomyces spp. are well-suited for characterizing the functions of secondary metabolites in microbial interactions.
(B) The symbiosis between bobtail squid and the marine bacterium Aliivibrio fischeri is fundamental to understanding host and microbial factors that influence colonization.
(C) The use of gnotobiotic mice is crucial for making links between host diet and the effects on specific microbial taxa in a community.

== See also ==
- Earth Microbiome Project
- Human microbiome
- Initial acquisition of microbiota
- Microbial population biology
- Microbiomes of the built environment
- Mycobiome
