= Cloverleaf model of tRNA =

Model of tRNA's molecular structure

Secondary cloverleaf structure of tRNA^{Phe} from yeast.

The cloverleaf model of tRNA is a model that depicts the molecular structure of tRNA. The model revealed that the chain of tRNA consists of two ends—sometimes called "business ends"—and three arms. Two of the arms have a loop, D-loop (dihydro U loop) and Tψc-loop with a ribosome recognition site. The third arm, known as the "variable arm", has a stem with optional loop. One end of the chains (with a double stranded structure in which the 5' and 3' ends are adjacent to each other), the amino acids acceptor stem, usually attaches to amino acids and such reactions are often catalyzed by a specific enzymes, aminoacyl tRNA synthetase. For example, if the amino acid that attach to the end is phenylalanine, the reaction will be catalyzed by phenylalanine-tRNA synthase to produce tRNA^{phe}.

The other end—the bottom often called the "DNA arm"—consists of a three base sequence that pairs with a complementary base sequence in a mRNA.

== See also ==
- Plaque hybridization
