= Plaque hybridization =

Plaque hybridization is a technique used in Molecular biology for the identification of recombinant phages. The procedure can also be used for the detection of differentially represented repetitive DNA. The technique (similar to colony hybridization) involves hybridizing isolated phage DNA to a label probe for the gene of study. This is followed by autoradiography to detect the position of the label. The plaque hybridization procedure has some advantages over colony hybridization due to the smaller and well defined area of the filter to which the DNA binds.
