= Phylosymbiosis =

Phyletic symbiosis in microbiome research

In the field of microbiome research, a group of species is said to show a phylosymbiotic signal if the degree of similarity between the species' microbiomes recapitulates to a significant extent their evolutionary history. In other words, a phylosymbiotic signal among a group of species is evident if their microbiome similarity dendrogram could prove to have significant similarities with their host's phylogenic tree. For the analysis of the phylosymbiotic signal to be reliable, environmental differences that could shape the host microbiome should be either eliminated or accounted for. One plausible mechanistic explanation for such phenomena could be, for example, a result of host immune genes that rapidly evolve in a continuous arms race with members of its microbiome.

== Animals ==
Across the animal kingdom there are many notable examples of phylosymbiosis. For instance, in non-human primates it was found that host evolutionary history had a substantially greater influence on the gut microbiome than either host dietary niche or geographic location. It was speculated that changes in gut physiology within the evolutionary history of non-human primates was the primary reason. This finding was particularly interesting as it contradicted previous research which reported that dietary niche was a strong factor in determining the gut microbiome of mammals.

== Plants ==
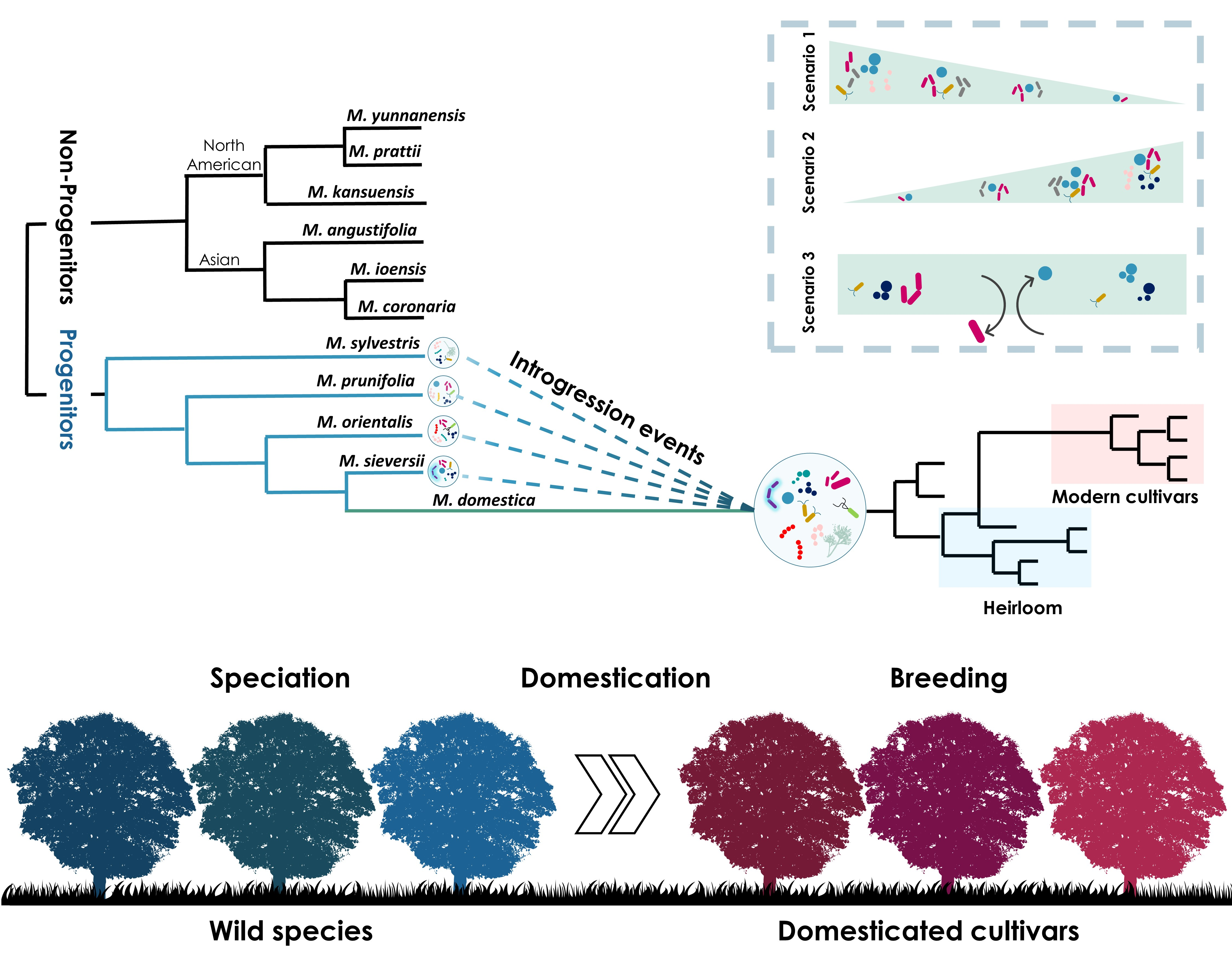
A conceptual figure on the impact of domestication on the plant endophytic microbiome. (a) A phylogenetic distance among Malus species which contains wild species (black branches) and progenitor wild species (blue branches). The extended green branch represents Malus domestica with its close affiliation its main ancestor (M. sieversii). Dashed lines indicate introgression events between Malus progenitors which contributed to the formation of M. domestica. (b) The predicted three scenarios: Scenario 1, reduction in species diversity due to loss in microbial species; Scenario 2, increase in microbial diversity due to introgressive hybridization during the apple domestication; Scenario 3, diversity was not affected by domestication.

Plant kingdoms has shown strong relationships of phylosymbiosis with notable examples in Malus (apple family) and Poaceae. (grass family) species where endophytic communities mirror host evolutionary relationships. During plant domestication, three scenarios of phylosymbiotic patterns have been observed: reduction in microbial diversity, increased diversity through hybridization, or maintenance of existing diversity levels. In the Malus species case, including wild and domesticated cultivars, Malus harbored endophytic communities that corresponded to their phylogenetic relationship.

== Factors that impact phylosymbiosis and distinction from coevolution ==
The concept of phylosymbiosis extends beyond simple correlation between host phylogeny and microbiome composition, encompassing deeper evolutionary implications. One crucial aspect is the distinction between phylosymbiosis and coevolution - while phylosymbiosis describes a pattern of association between host evolutionary relationships and microbiome communities, it does not necessarily imply coevolution between hosts and their microbes. This distinction is particularly important because phylosymbiotic patterns can arise through various ecological and evolutionary processes, not all of which involve direct coevolutionary relationships.

Vellend's four principles - selection, drift, speciation, and dispersal provide a comprehensive framework for understanding how phylosymbiotic patterns emerge in host-microbiome relationship s. Selection impacts through host physiology and immune responses shapes microbial communities, while drift influences random population changes, speciation leads to host-specific adaptations, and dispersal affects microbiome transmission between hosts. These principles help explain why phylosymbiosis can exist without strict coevolution, as the observed patterns may result from any combination of these ecological processes rather than requiring direct evolutionary relationships between hosts and their microbiomes. Recent research has revealed that phylosymbiosis can be disrupted by various factors, including host diet, environmental changes, and disease states. This disruption provides valuable insights into the stability and resilience of host-microbe associations. For instance, studies in Nasonia wasps have demonstrated that hybrid hosts often show broken phylosymbiotic patterns, suggesting that genetic incompatibilities between hosts and microbes can emerge during speciation. This observation has led to the hypothesis that phylosymbiosis might contribute to speciation through microbiome-mediated reproductive isolation.

The implications of phylosymbiosis for host health and adaptation are particularly relevant in the context of global change. As species face novel environmental challenges, understanding how phylosymbiotic relationships influence host adaptation becomes increasingly important. Research has shown that microbiomes can facilitate host adaptation to new environments, and the strength of phylosymbiotic relationships may influence this adaptive potential. This has led to growing interest in using phylosymbiotic principles to inform conservation strategies and predict species' responses to environmental change.

== Investigational Methods ==
Methodologically, the study of phylosymbiosis has been revolutionized by advances in high-throughput sequencing technologies and bioinformatics tools. Modern analyses often employ sophisticated statistical approaches to account for the compositional nature of microbiome data and the complex hierarchical structure of host-microbe associations. These methods include techniques such as distance-based redundancy analysis, structural equation modeling, and phylogenetic generalized linear mixed models, which help researchers disentangle the various factors contributing to phylosymbiotic patterns.

== Applications ==
=== Agricultural and Livestock ===
In agricultural contexts, phylosymbiosis has emerged as a valuable framework for crop improvement and pest management. Understanding phylosymbiotic patterns in crop species can guide strategies for enhancing plant resistance to pathogens and improving nutrient uptake efficiency. Similarly, in livestock management, phylosymbiotic insights are being used to optimize animal health through microbiome manipulation, taking into account the evolutionary relationships between host species and their associated microbial communities.

=== Personalized Medicine and Microbiome Therapeutics ===
Research into phylosymbiotic relationships has revealed that human genetic ancestry influences microbiome composition, which in turn affects drug metabolism and therapeutic outcomes. This understanding has led to:

- Improved prediction of drug responses based on host-microbiome interactions

== See also ==
- Microbial ecology
- Microbiome
