= Phytoplankton microbiome =

Marine community of plankton and microbes

A phytoplankton microbiome is the community of microorganisms—mainly bacteria, but also including fungi and viruses—that live in association with phytoplankton. These microbiomes play a critical role in marine ecosystems by supporting phytoplankton health, facilitating nutrient cycling, sustaining food webs, and contributing to climate regulation.

Microbial partners help decompose organic matter and recycle key nutrients like nitrogen and carbon, sustaining primary production, and supporting ocean productivity and phytoplankton community structure. Diazotrophic cyanobacteria, for example, fix atmospheric nitrogen, boosting productivity in nutrient-poor waters. As primary producers, phytoplankton absorb CO_{2} through photosynthesis, contributing to the biological carbon pump and long-term carbon sequestration.

Phytoplankton–microbiome interactions are central to the global biogeochemical cycles. Microbial diversity influences host physiology and ecosystem functions, while environmental factors such as temperature, nutrient levels, and ocean chemistry shape microbiome composition and function. Chemical signaling—through Quorum sensing and Infochemicals—regulate microbial behavior, impacting bloom dynamics, symbiosis, and defense mechanisms. Viruses also affect phytoplankton populations by driving nutrient turnover and mediating carbon flow.

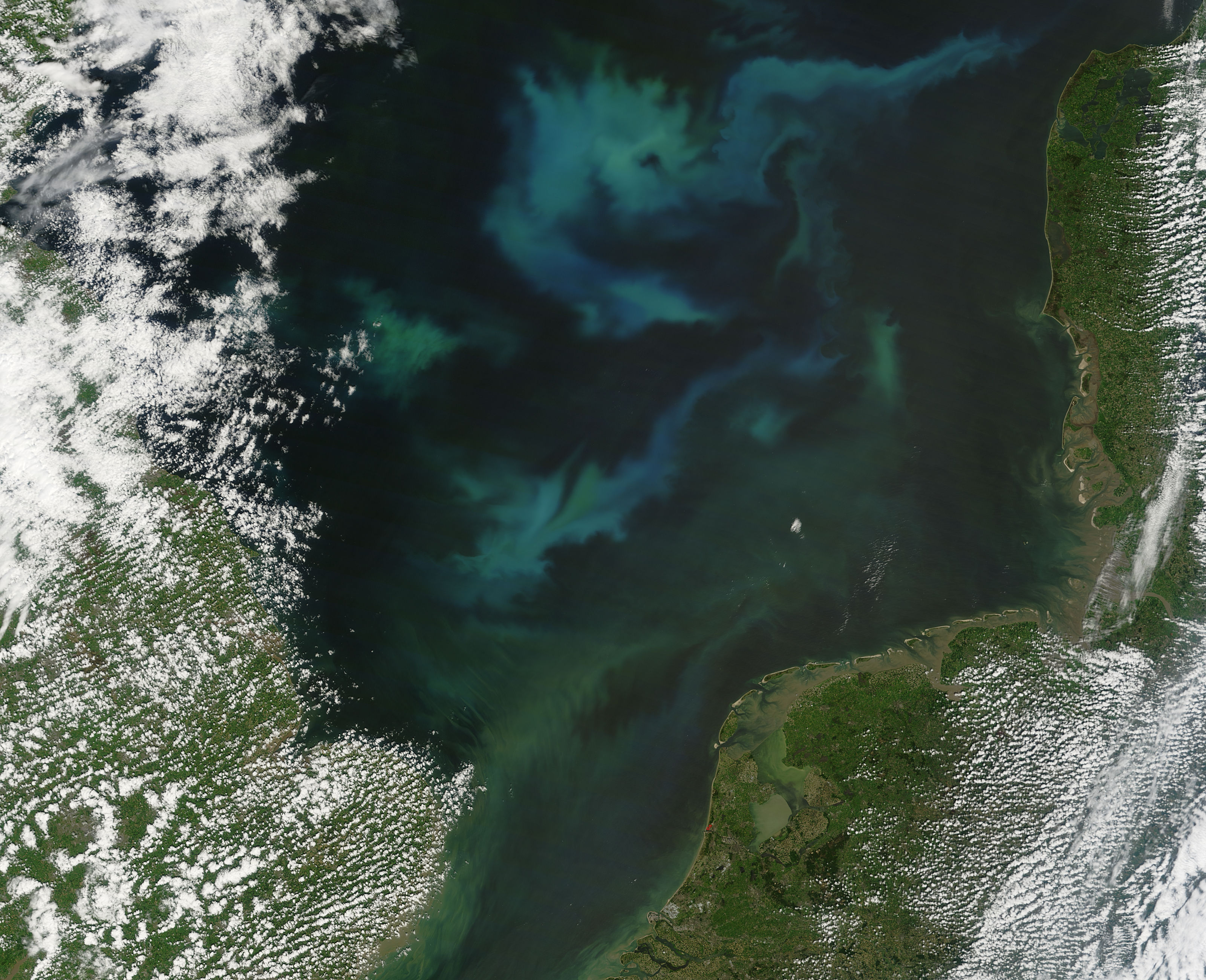
Swirling patterns of a massive phytoplankton bloom in the North Sea, captured by NASA's Terra satellite on June 6, 2015. Though microscopic, phytoplankton blooms can span vast areas and play a crucial role in marine food webs and the global carbon cycle.

Current research focuses on microbial diversity, environmental drivers, and chemical communication, all of which are crucial to understanding the phytoplankton microbiome's ecological functions. These microbial interactions shape marine ecosystem stability, food web dynamics, and global climate processes.

== Ecological role and function ==
Symbiotic relationships between phytoplankton and their microbiomes are crucial for promoting phytoplankton growth, resilience to stress, and overall ecological stability. Microorganisms, including bacteria and archaea, provide essential nutrients like nitrogen and phosphorus through nitrogen fixation and nutrient recycling. In return, phytoplankton offer a stable habitat, supplying organic compounds and surface areas where microbes can attach.

These interactions bolster the phytoplankton's ability to cope with environmental challenges, such as oxidative stress, pathogens, and harmful algal blooms, through the protective functions of specific microbial communities. Additionally, microbiomes influence marine primary production by enhancing nutrient uptake and stimulating phytoplankton growth, which in turn supports higher trophic levels in marine food webs.

Moreover, the microbes associated with phytoplankton are key players in biogeochemical cycles. They facilitate nitrogen fixation and break down organic matter, releasing usable nitrogen and carbon that fuel phytoplankton growth and help close crucial nutrient loops. These dynamic interactions between phytoplankton and their microbiomes are instrumental in maintaining ocean productivity and the functioning of marine ecosystems.

== Microbial diversity and environmental influences ==
=== Role of microbiomes in phytoplankton physiology and ecological interactions ===
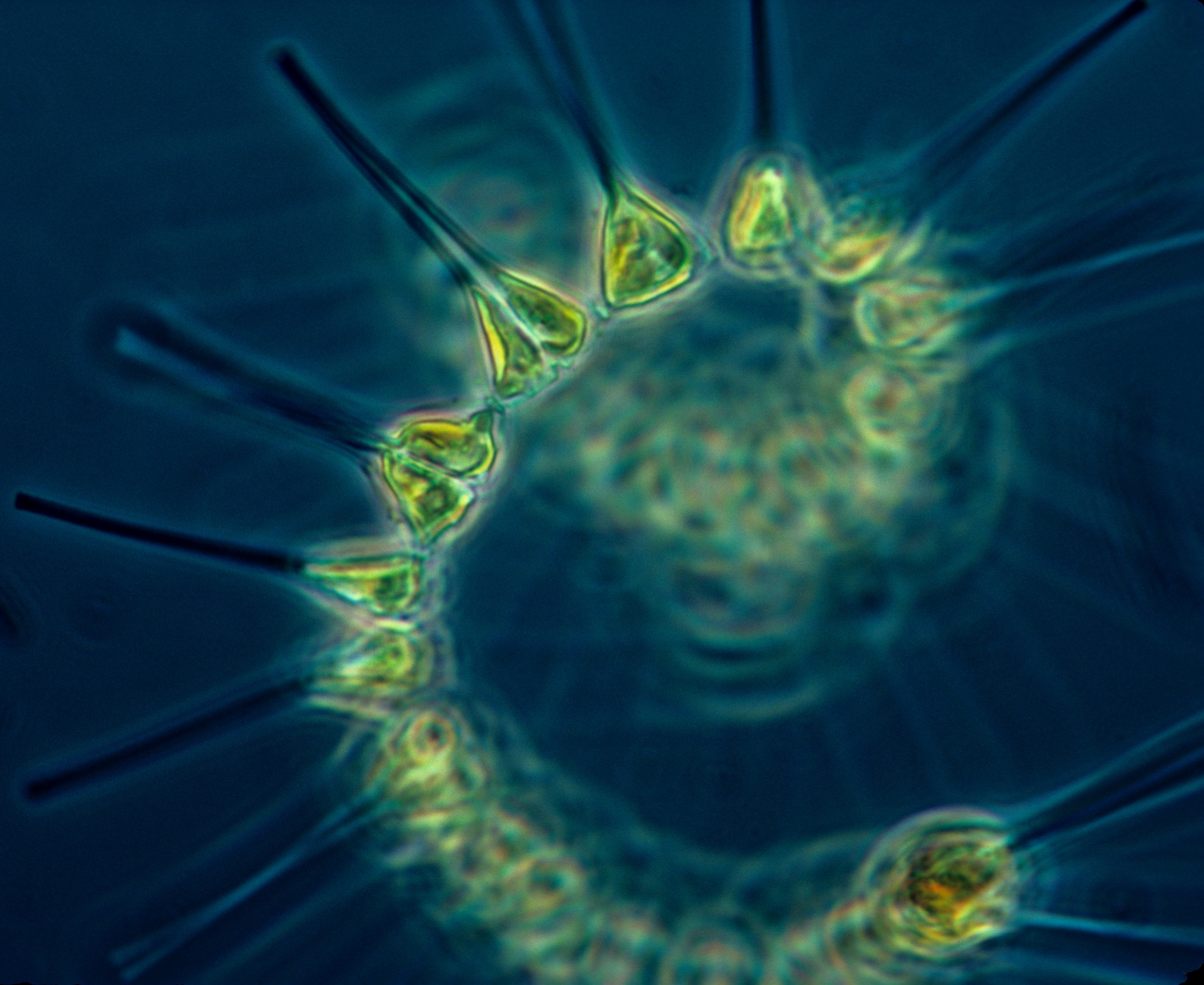
Marine phytoplankton

Microbial diversity within eukaryotes influences host physiology, nutrient cycling, and community dynamics in marine ecosystems. Higher microbiome diversity correlates with increased bacterial phenotypic and taxonomic diversity, while lower diversity leads to reduced bacterial diversity. The microbiome of phytoplankton also affects phytoplankton growth and survival rates, which affect oceanic cycles. Additionally, microbial diversity affects phytoplankton biomass, with low diversity linked to higher biomass and higher diversity to lower biomass. Under stressful conditions, such as rising water temperatures, the impact of microbiome diversity on phytoplankton community structure is amplified, decreasing community diversity and abundance. Increased microbial diversity also elevates the levels of dissolved nitrogen and phosphorus in the water.

Phytoplankton are genetically diverse, spanning 12 taxonomic divisions, yet maintain conserved metabolic functions vital for biogeochemical stability, such as photosynthesis and nutrient cycling. Cyanobacteria, an ancient group, dominate modern phytoplankton populations and contributed to the evolution of eukaryotic algae and plants through endosymbiosis. This functional redundancy has ensured phytoplankton's resilience despite environmental changes. Environmental stresses, including chemical alterations in ocean chemistry by phytoplankton, drive phylogenetic diversity and reinforce ecosystem stability.

Phytoplankton release dissolved organic matter (DOM), which sustains their microbiome and part of the bacterioplankton community. Microbial communities in these systems are shaped by deterministic processes, enhancing host function, while free-living communities are more flexible and less diverse. Microevolution through host-microbe interactions supports ecological adaptation and niche differentiation.

=== Influence of host genotype on phytoplankton-associated microbiomes ===
The phycosphere refers to the region surrounding individual phytoplankton, where algae, bacteria, archaea, and viruses interact. Among these organisms, bacteria have the most significant influence on the phycosphere. The specific conditions of the phycosphere help select particular bacterial populations, which in turn shape the microbial community. Over time, as these communities evolve, they can also enhance the fitness of the host.

The interactions between bacteria and phytoplankton are complex. In marine ecosystems, it remains unclear whether the genetic makeup of the host influences the bacterial community composition. However, it is known that phytoplankton species are categorized into populations based on their genetic traits, often linked to their ability to survive in specific environmental conditions. For instance, a study on T. rotula showed that the genotype of the host phytoplankton influences the microbial community surrounding it.

=== Influence of chemical signaling on phytoplankton-associated microbiomes and algal blooms ===
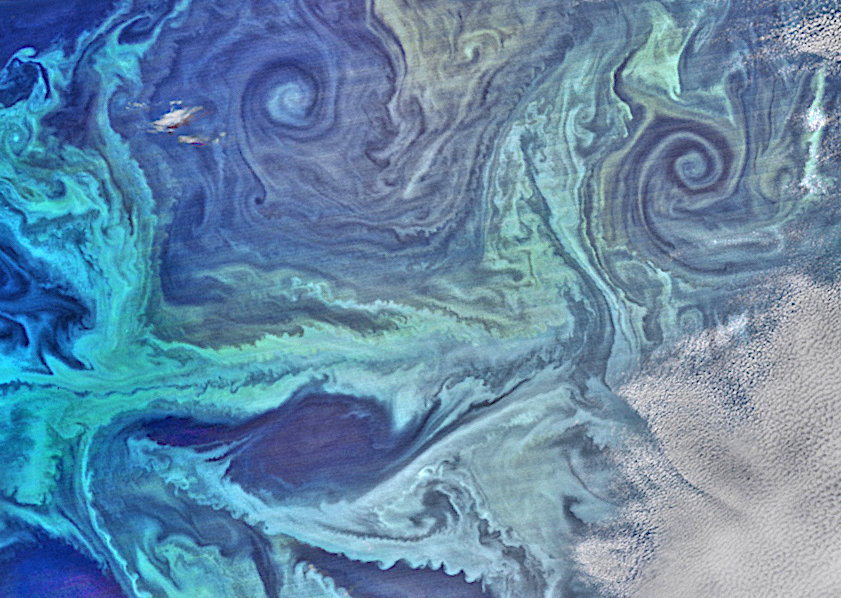
NASA satellite view of Southern Ocean phytoplankton bloom

Phytoplankton interact with surrounding microbial communities through chemical signaling, exchanging compounds that influence growth, metabolism, and community composition. Microbes provide essential nutrients such as vitamins and nitrogen, while phytoplankton release organic molecules that help structure microbial populations.

These interactions are often concentrated in the phycosphere, however, during large blooms, chemical signals can operate over broader scales due to increased cell density and compound concentration.

Throughout the bloom cycle—ranging from dormancy to demise—chemical signals mediate different ecological roles. In early stages, signals like DMSP attract beneficial bacteria. During peak growth, microbes exchange growth-promoting compounds, while in later stages, stress-related signals may trigger defense or cell death, contributing to bloom decline and nutrient recycling.

These microscale chemical exchanges shape microbial succession and impact broader ecosystem functions, including carbon and nutrient cycling.

=== Composition and diversity of phytoplankton-associated microbial communities ===
Phytoplankton exhibit vast genetic diversity across 12 taxonomic divisions but share conserved metabolic pathways that support critical biogeochemical processes, including oxygenic photosynthesis and nutrient cycling. Cyanobacteria, among the oldest phytoplankton, shaped evolutionary history by contributing to eukaryotic algal development through endosymbiosis. Despite significant environmental changes, phytoplankton persist due to functional redundancy and genetic adaptation. Their microbiomes are sustained by dissolved organic matter (DOM) excreted by the host, influencing both associated and free-living microbial communities. Deterministic processes drive microbial diversity, shaping phytoplankton functions, while microevolution supports niche adaptation.

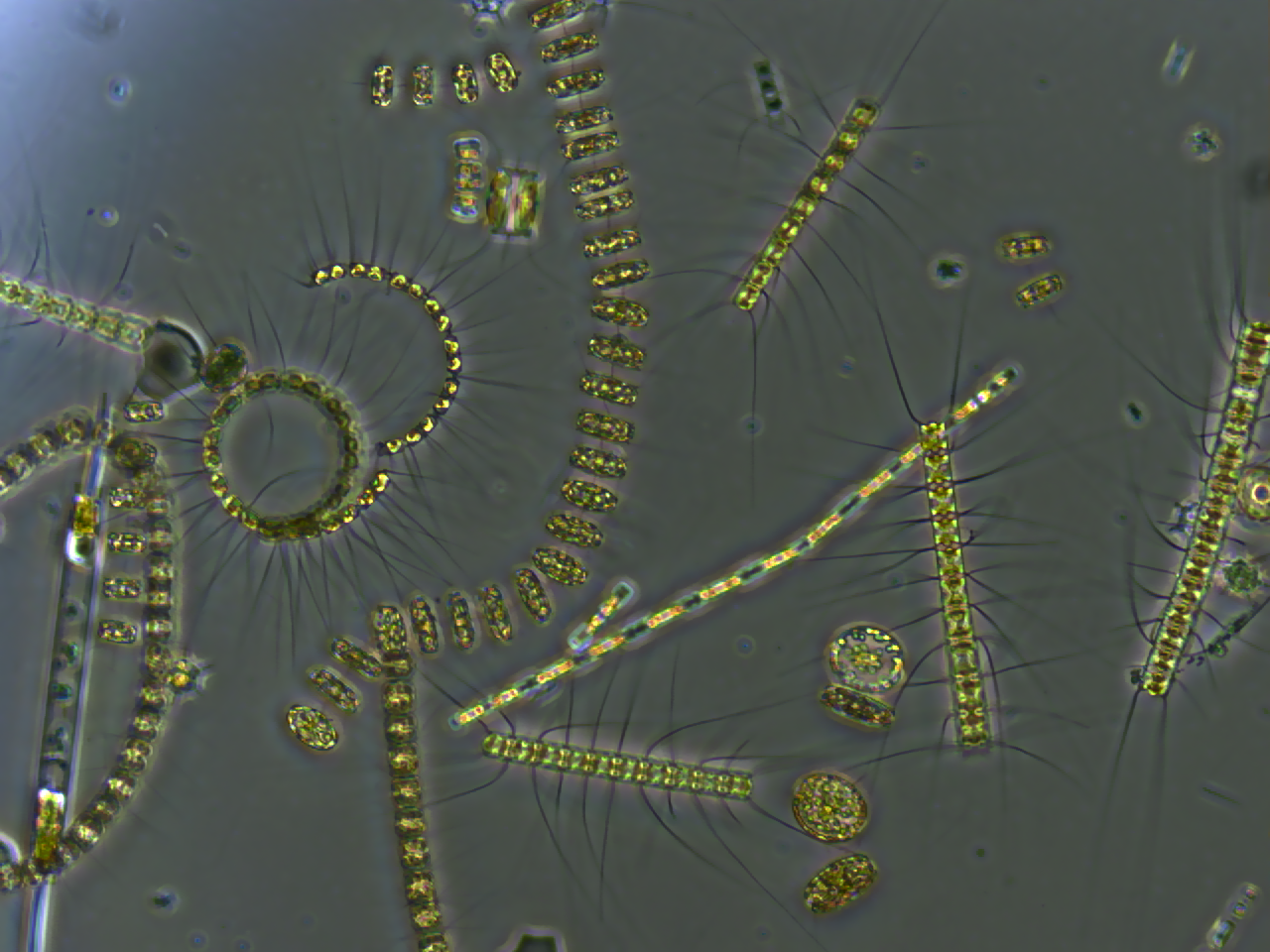
A vibrant mixed phytoplankton community captured on August 15, 2018, during NASA's Earth Expeditions. These microscopic organisms form the foundation of marine food webs and play a key role in global carbon cycling.

=== Influence of host on microbiome structure ===
Phytoplankton significantly shape their microbiomes, with host genotype playing a crucial role in determining microbial community structure. Microbial diversity is more closely linked to host genetics than environmental factors, with these patterns observed across ocean basins. Host-driven microbiome recruitment influences both composition and function, and this specificity can persist over generations. While these microbiomes contribute to host fitness, the extent of the benefits can vary by species, and long-term shifts in microbial composition can influence how hosts adapt to changing environments.

=== Environmental factors affecting microbial composition ===
Multiple environmental factors regulate phytoplankton microbiomes:

- Nutrient Type and Availability: Levels of nitrogen, phosphorus, and iron shape microbial diversity and function, favoring taxa specialized in nutrient uptake.
- Temperature: Affects microbial metabolism and diversity, with warming favoring specific bacterial lineages while reducing overall diversity.
- Light Conditions: Influences phytoplankton photosynthesis and DOM release, altering microbial composition based on organic compound availability
- Salinity: Impacts microbial community structure by selecting for salt-tolerant taxa and influencing metabolic functions.
- Chemical Interactions: Phytoplankton excrete compounds such as exopolysaccharides and lipids that shape microbial composition, while pollutants and toxins select for bacteria with detoxification capabilities.

These environmental variables interact with host genetics to structure microbiomes, influencing ecological processes like nutrient cycling and carbon sequestration.

=== Microbial interactions with phytoplankton and microbiome effects on host ===
Phytoplankton–microbial interactions can be:

- Beneficial: Mutualistic bacteria provide essential vitamins and siderophores, while phytoplankton supply dissolved organic carbon. Sulfitobacter bacteria release indole-3-acetic acid (IAA), promoting algal cell division.
- Neutral: Some bacteria coexist with phytoplankton without significantly altering host physiology, forming commensal relationships.
- Harmful: Antagonistic interactions include algicidal bacteria producing lytic enzymes that degrade phytoplankton, or competitive exclusion where bacteria outcompete phytoplankton for nutrients.

Understanding these interactions is essential for elucidating phytoplankton population dynamics and their broader ecological roles.

=== Chemical signaling and microbial interactions ===
Chemical signaling through infochemicals is crucial for microbial interactions and the regulation of aquatic ecosystems. These signals enable both intraspecific and interspecific communication, influencing microbial community dynamics and ecological processes. Phytoplankton release allelopathic compounds that affect microbial growth, community composition, and toxin production, particularly in species like Alexandrium spp. and Prymnesium spp. Quorum sensing (QS) molecules also regulate bacterial behavior, playing a significant role in microbial communication. In the phycosphere, Sulfitobacter species enhance diatom growth by secreting IAA. Furthermore, intraspecific signaling in microalgae fosters reproduction and genetic diversity, maintaining ecological balance and community structure.

== Microbial functions ==
=== Microbial assembly and metabolic exchanges ===
The structure of microbial communities is influenced not only by species composition but also by the biotic interactions involving the flow of energy and metabolites that drive trophic dynamics. While traditional ecological theory emphasizes interspecific competition and abiotic constraints (e.g., temperature and nutrient availability) as the main determinants of community assembly, recent studies suggest that the success of different microbial species also depends on their ability to interact with other microbes and have metabolic interdependencies among them.

At the base of ecological composition is trophic interactions and the creation of opportunities for species to establish themselves and reassemble an environment. Environmental disturbances such as seasonal mixing, upwelling, and viral infections can disrupt established communities, allowing microbial colonizers to enter. After a species has entered a system, its persistence in a disturbed environment depends on its efficiency in using available resources and its ability to engage in metabolic exchanges with surrounding microbes. If unable to form metabolic linkages, a species can be subject to competitive exclusion by more efficient species depending on its environmental conditions.

In high-resource environments, competition dominates, while in lower resource environments, the exchange of metabolites allows for less dominant species to coexist together. These interactions form cross-feeding networks, in which one species' metabolic byproducts (e.g., amino acids, acetates, and organic molecules) can be utilized as another species' substrates. For example, another species may use a bacterium that produces acetate as a waste product, as a source of carbon or energy source. These interactions encourage coexistence by creating symbiotic or obligatory relationships between microbes.

=== Nutrient cycling and carbon sequestration ===
As decomposers and chemical converters, microorganisms function by breaking down organic matter and facilitating the transformation between inorganic and organic forms of matter. Through this conversion, microbes release nutrients that can be redistributed to primary producers, enabling microbes to help facilitate the cycling of nutrients such as nitrogen, phosphorus, and iron. Nitrogen cycling, in particular, involves several microbial pathways that determine the amount of bioavailable nitrogen:

- Nitrification: the aerobic oxidation of ammonia (NH_{4}^{+}) to nitrite (NO_{2}^{-}) and then nitrate (NO_{3}^{-})
- Denitrification: the anaerobic conversion of nitrate to nitrogen gas (N_{2})
- Anammox (anaerobic ammonium oxidation): the reaction of ammonium to form nitrite to form N_{2}
- DNRA (dissimilatory nitrate reduction to ammonium): the reduction of nitrate back to ammonium, retaining nitrogen in a bioavailable form.

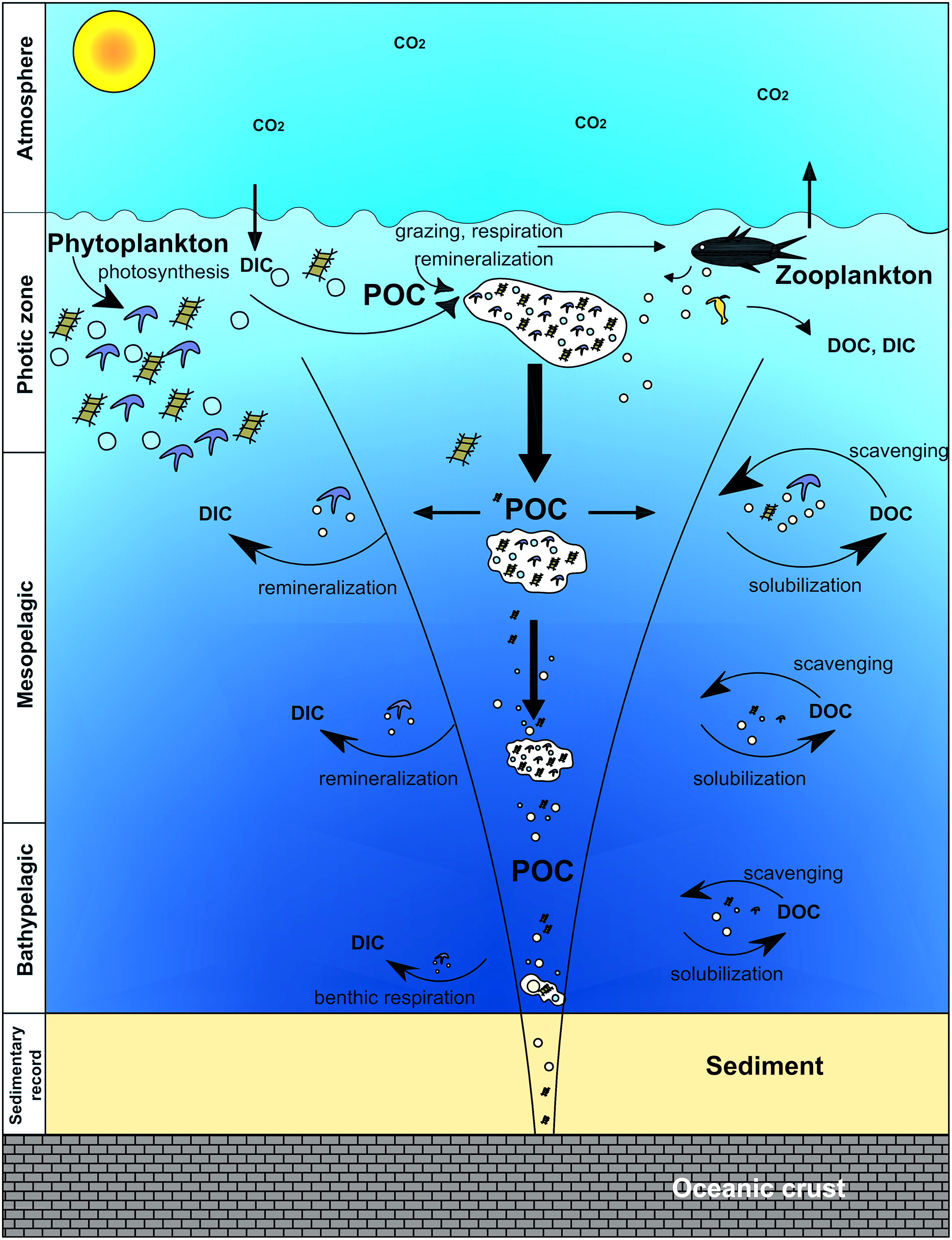
Vertical transport of carbon in the ocean. POC aggregates sink through the water column leading to remineralization and long-term carbon storage.

These transformations regulate the ratio of dissolved inorganic nitrogen (DIN) and particulate organic nitrogen (PON) available. In the case of the mineralization of nutrients, heterotrophic microbes break down organic matter and release inorganic nutrients (phosphate and ammonium) into its more oxidized forms of nitrate and orthophosphate. In these forms, organic compounds can be broken down easily and be quickly recycled in part of short-term productivity.

As a by-product of remineralization in the upper ocean, microbes interact with phytoplankton and sinking organic matter to help form recalcitrant dissolved organic matter (RDOM) and facilitate long-term carbon storage in the deep ocean. When phytoplankton die or are consumed, their biomass forms larger aggregates and sink through the water column, contributing to the flux of carbon part of the biological carbon pump. As these particles descend, heterotrophic bacteria break down the organic matter through enzymatic degradation and release dissolved organic and inorganic carbon in the forms of CO_{2} and HCO_{3}^{-}.

=== Microbial-viral interaction ===
While trophic interactions and metabolic dependences have roles in shaping microbial assembly, they are also regulated by viral infections. In particular, viruses that infect bacteria (bacteriophages) and phytoplankton are seen to influence the coexistence of microbial populations through host-specific lytic infections.

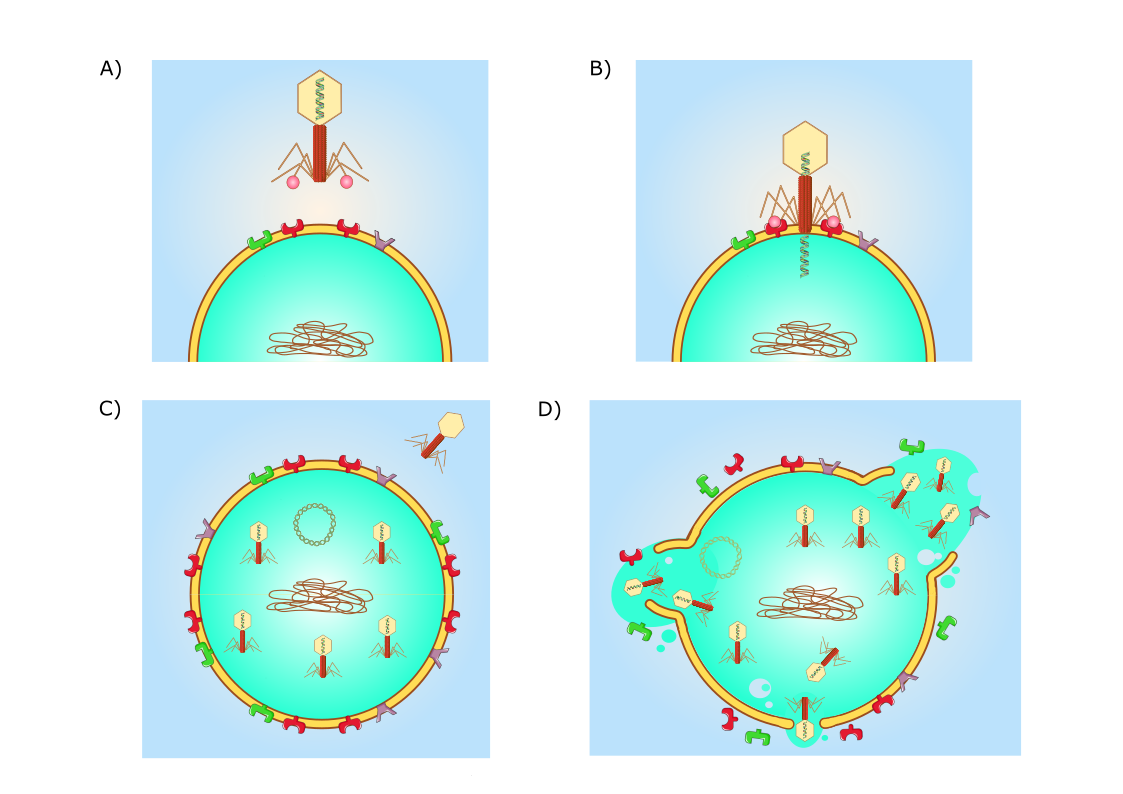
Overview of the lytic cycle of a bacteriophage. (A). The phage binds to the surface of a bacterial cell. (B) Genetic material is injected into the host. (C) The host's machinery is hijacked to reproduce viral DNA. (D). Bacteriophages build up until the intracellular contents burst, releasing the virus to be taken up again.

In 1961, George Evelyn Hutchinson introduced the "paradox of the plankton", which questioned how numerous species could coexist in a relatively isotopic or unstructured environment and compete without a single dominant competitor. The idea follows conventional theory, where in an unstructured environment, competitive exclusion should occur and leave a microbial community to a population of a single species; however, this was not seen in some settings. To explain this dilemma, viral infections were noted, as viruses help prevent any single species from dominating by infecting the most abundant hosts. When a virus infects a microbial cell, it infiltrates the host's machinery to reproduce, causing the cell to burst and release its intracellular contents as dissolved organic matter. This is part of a process called the viral shunt. The released dissolved organic matter is taken up by heterotrophic bacteria to be recycled and remineralized.

This type of viral control is modeled by the boom-and-busted dynamics (BBeD) framework. After a phytoplankton species blooms and experiences an increase in population, it becomes more susceptible to viral infection and, once infected, is subject to an equally rapid decrease or bust in population. In this way, viral infections can impose top-down regulation on a dominant species by saturating the environment with host-specific viruses. This adds a layer of species-specific regulation where potentially hyper-successful species are prevented from having successive blooms and ecological space is created for other, less dominant species to compete in the same system.

== Microbial adaptations ==
=== Microbial adaptations to changing environmental conditions impact ecosystem dynamics ===
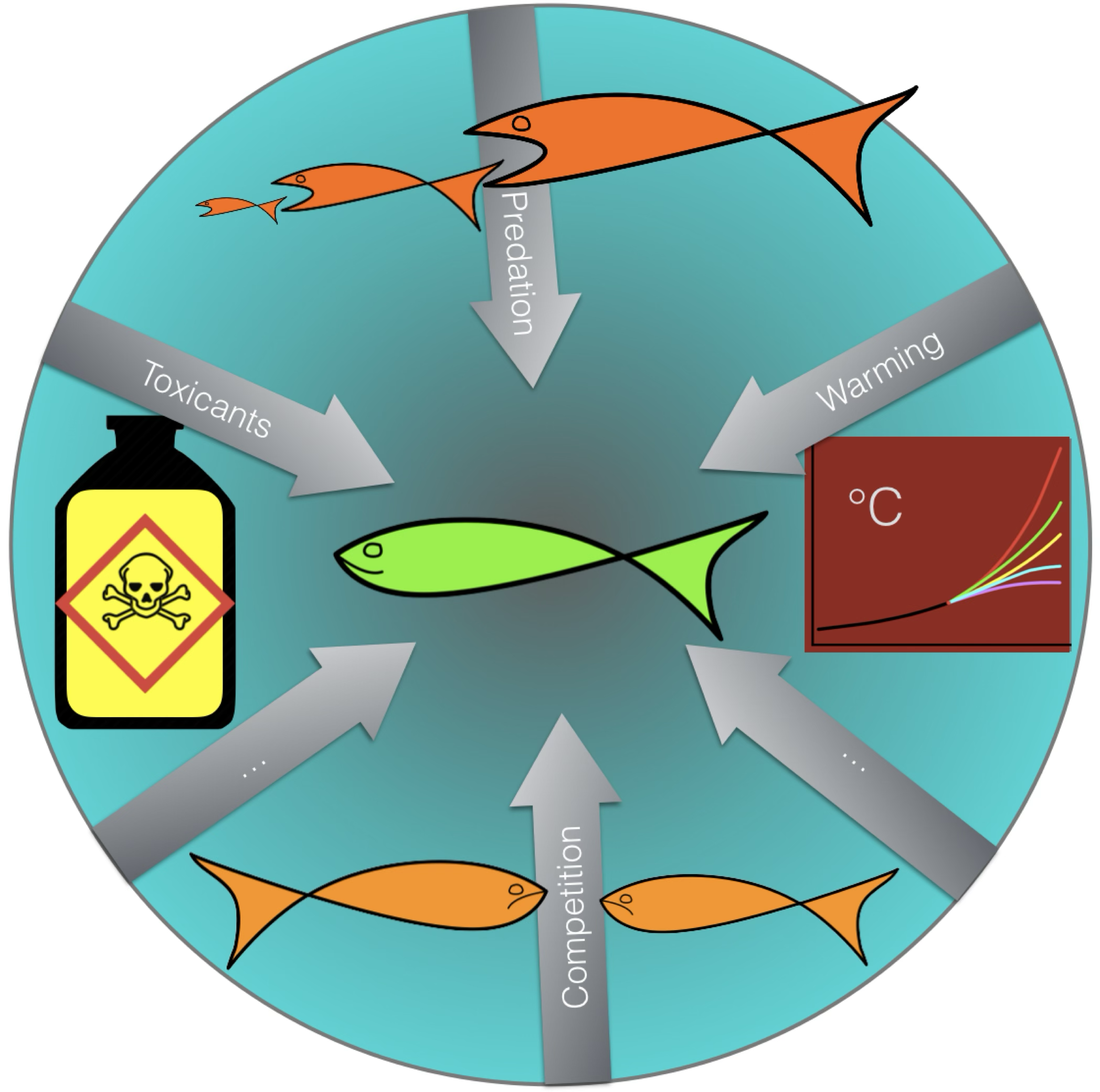
Examples of environmental and anthropogenic stressors on marine organisms

Phytoplankton microbial community structures and diversity are dictated by environmental conditions. Environmental and anthropogenic stressors such as elevated temperatures and changes in nutrient availability drive changes in the phycosphere, which consequently impacts ecosystem dynamics and biogeochemical cycling.

Distinct microbiome compositions have been characterized in a study that performed metagenomic analysis to compare phytoplankton communities sampled from polar and non-polar regions. The differences in microbiome compositions were hypothesized to be due to differences in environmental conditions and stressors, such as sea ice and thermohaline mixing. The same study also uncovered differences in metabolic pathways involved in nutrient acquisition and utilization, correlated to geographical location.

=== Microbiomes play important roles in maintaining the health and fitness of phytoplankton hosts ===
Phytoplankton microbiomes play important roles in maintaining host health and fitness. The symbiotic interactions within the phycosphere impacts the biological processes of both counterparts: host and microbiome, dictating their ecological roles. Additionally, the phytoplankton microbiome has been shown to be integral in the adaptation of the phycosphere to stressors such as toxic pollutants and parasite infections.

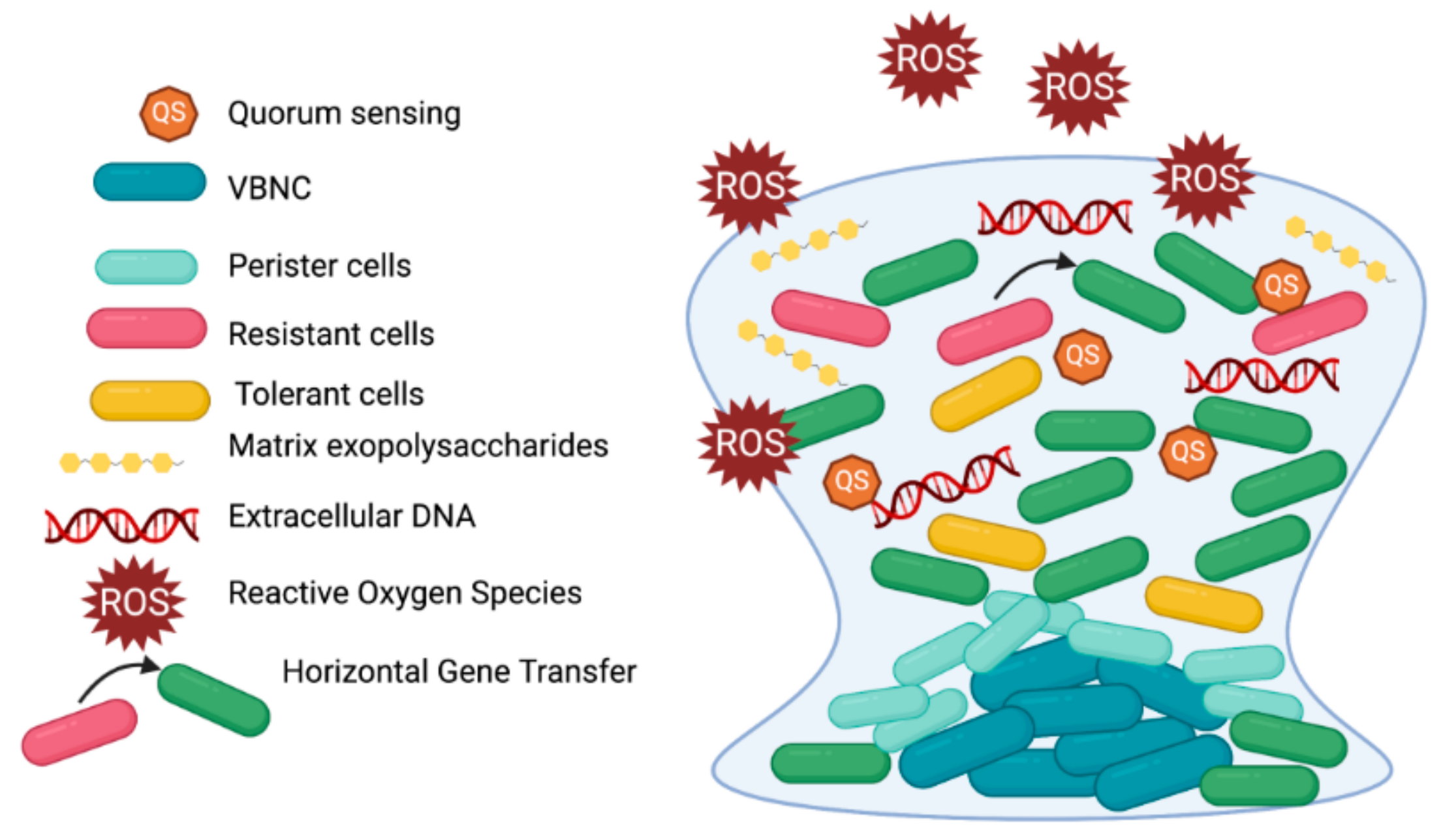
The composition of a biofilm

Toxic anthropogenic inputs into the ocean, such as herbicides and pesticides, have been linked to impaired function of photosynthetic pigments in phytoplankton. These phytoplankton are impacted more significantly by these pollutants than their microbiome counterparts, which can convert toxic compounds into growth stimulating molecules, promoting the survivability of phytoplankton in polluted environmental conditions. Additionally, horizontal gene transfer of tolerance genes contribute to the survivability of marine phytoplankton in the presence of toxins.

Extracellular polymeric substances (EPSs) produced by microbes contribute to the formation of biofilms that acts as a protective layer; trapping and metabolizing toxic compounds into less harmful compounds.

Polar diatoms and their associated microbiomes have been observed to work in synergy to produce EPSs in order to disrupt ice crystal formation and reduce the freezing point of ice. Since polar diatoms are often incorporated into sea ice, it is hypothesized that they use ice binding proteins and EPSs to modulate their icy environment and maintain an aqueous brine channel system to preserve access to nutrients.

=== Projected impacts of anthropogenic stressors on microbiome diversity ===
Environmental conditions modulate phytoplankton associated microbiome function and diversity. Ocean environments are changing as a result of human activity: causing variations in temperature, nutrient availability, and toxic pollutants. As ocean ecosystems continue to be impacted by anthropogenic disturbances, shifts in phytoplankton community composition and diversity may drive changes in global primary productivity trends. While current knowledge on the impacts of climate change on phytoplankton microbiomes is fairly limited, monitoring for changes using metagenomics and metatranscriptomics is a promising field that may provide more insight and predictions regarding the responses in phytoplankton microbiomes to global warming.

Spatial distribution of Oxygen Minimum Zones (OMZs) in the global open-oceans at 400 and 800 m depths. Station data at the center of each OMZ is also included on the right with their respective abbreviated names.

Anthropogenic stressors causing increased temperature and changes in nutrient availability contribute to and exacerbate decreasing microbiome diversity, which has been shown to impact nutrient cycling. Most notably, resulting in depleted nitrogen and phosphorus. As nitrogen and phosphorus are already considered to be common limiting nutrients in ocean environments, depletion of these nutrients can directly impact the primary productivity in the region. Among other complex changes in ecosystem dynamics, ocean acidification has been shown to inhibit nitrification by microbes, while increasing oxygen minimum zones (OMZs) are associated with denitrification driven by microbial processes. These shifts may result in restructured nutrient cycling which may have cascading effects on ocean ecosystems on a large scale.

Changes in phytoplankton morphology—shifting towards a smaller cell size—and community composition have also been observed in response to decreased microbiome diversity. This is hypothesized to be due to host cell stress as a result of nitrogen and phosphorus limitation.
