= Pathobiont =

Microbibal ecological classification

A pathobiont is an organism that is native to the host's microbiome that under certain environmental or genetic changes can become pathogenic and induce disease.

Pathobionts differ from opportunistic pathogens in the sense that they are normally native to the microbiome, where opportunistic pathogens are acquired from outside that microbiome.

== Etymology ==
The term was originally coined in 2008 by Sarkis Mazmanian to describe Helicobacter hepaticus and its ability to cause colitis under certain environmental conditions.

The term pathobiont had mixed reception among the microbiology field. The main argument against using the term is that some bacteria labelled as pathobionts also exhibit beneficial effects to hosts under normal conditions. The notion that their pathogenesis is tied to environmental or genetic changes from a perceived normal state would point to a firm understanding of a normal gut microbiome, which can vary drastically. Arguers against the term state all bacteria have metabolism that are environmentally dependent, and even symbionts have been shown to exhibit deleterious clinical effects under certain conditions. The argument has led to the development of a proposed term, pathogenic potential, to describe a microbe's ability to cause disease. Both terms are currently used within the field.
