= Mycobiome =

Fungal community in and on an organism

The mycobiome, mycobiota, or fungal microbiome, is the fungal community in and on an organism.

The word "mycobiome" comes from the ancient Greek μύκης (mukēs), meaning "fungus" with the suffix "biome" derived from the Greek βίος (bíos), meaning "life." The term was coined in the 2009 paper by Gillevet et al.

Most species of fungi are decomposers with the ability to break down complex polymers. Fungi are commonly found within plant cells in an endophytic relationship or as a pathogen. Most plants also form mutualistic relationships with fungi that accelerate nutrient uptake among their root structures. The most common phyla present in the fungal communities that live alongside animals and in aquatic environments are Ascomycota and Basidiomycota. Animals will typically form a commensal relationship with fungi with the occasional occurrence of a pathogenic interaction.

== Interactions with other microbes ==
Fungal microbes are amongst a wide variety of other microbes involved in a symbiotic relationship involving multicellular organisms. In mammals, the gut flora is usually met with vastly diverse populations of microbes from many kingdoms, where fungal populations make up less than 1% of the entire gut biome. Due to the coexistence of fungal populations with other microbes in most cases of host-symbiont associations, it's important to assess common dynamics that may occur.

Most interactions between microbes in the gut are either competitive or cooperative. This can be seen with multiple fungal microbes as well by observing populations through the treatment of antibiotics and antifungals. Research on microbial populations in animal models has resulted in noticeable fluctuations in microbe populations. Antibiotic treatment has mostly shown increases in parasitic fungal presence, suggesting competitive behaviors between microbes against fungi. Additionally, application of antifungal molecules have resulted in colitis in mice, suggesting that commensal fungi are responsible for balancing bacterial populations that are involved in dysbiosis. Despite limited knowledge on the gut mycobiome, this research suggests that interactions between fungal and bacterial microbes in the mammalian gut are largely competitive.

=== Lichen ===
Lichens are the symbiotic relationship between a wide range of fungi and photosynthesizing microbes that are either algal chlorophytes or cyanobacteria. The primary symbiosis involves fungi gaining energy from their photosynthesizing symbiotic microbe, and in return, provides a structural scaffold from the hyphae. These interactions are classically seen as mutualistic, but have been questioned if fungi might also be capable of playing a controlled parasitic role.

== Plants ==
Plants also have mutualistic symbiotic relationships with fungal communities that are found in a microbe abundant layer of the soil called the rhizosphere. Fungi can be vertically transmitted to progeny plants, or horizontally through fungal diffusion in the soil. Regardless of transmission, the most common cases of fungal plant symbiosis happens when fungal communities colonize plant root structure. There are some cases of symbiosis that begin before maturity such as the Orchidaceae family, in which symbiosis begins at the seed germination phase. Arbuscular mycorrhizal fungi supply the plant essential inorganic nutrients (in the form of minerals) for 80% of terrestrial plant species. In return the plant will provide fungi with plant assimilated carbon that can easily be metabolized and used for energy.

=== Evolutionary Symbiosis ===
DNA sequencing and fossil records have derived evidence that this mutualistic relationship between fungi and plants is extremely ancient. It is even suggested that different subspecies of fungi have played major roles in shaping the plants immune system in the early evolutionary moments of plants colonizing land. Specific gene clusters in the plant's genome used to code for fungicidal properties like the production of isoflavonoids in the Fabaceae plant family are toxic and used to regulate the growth of expected fungal presence. In a coevolutionary response, arbuscular fungal communities breed quickly and evolutionarily selected for the development of specific gene clusters to detoxify and metabolize a wide variety of organic antifungal chemicals. This exchange of evolutionary pressures has given a variety of plant species better immune systems, while simultaneously giving mutualist fungal communities new sources of plant energy at the genomic level.

== Insects ==
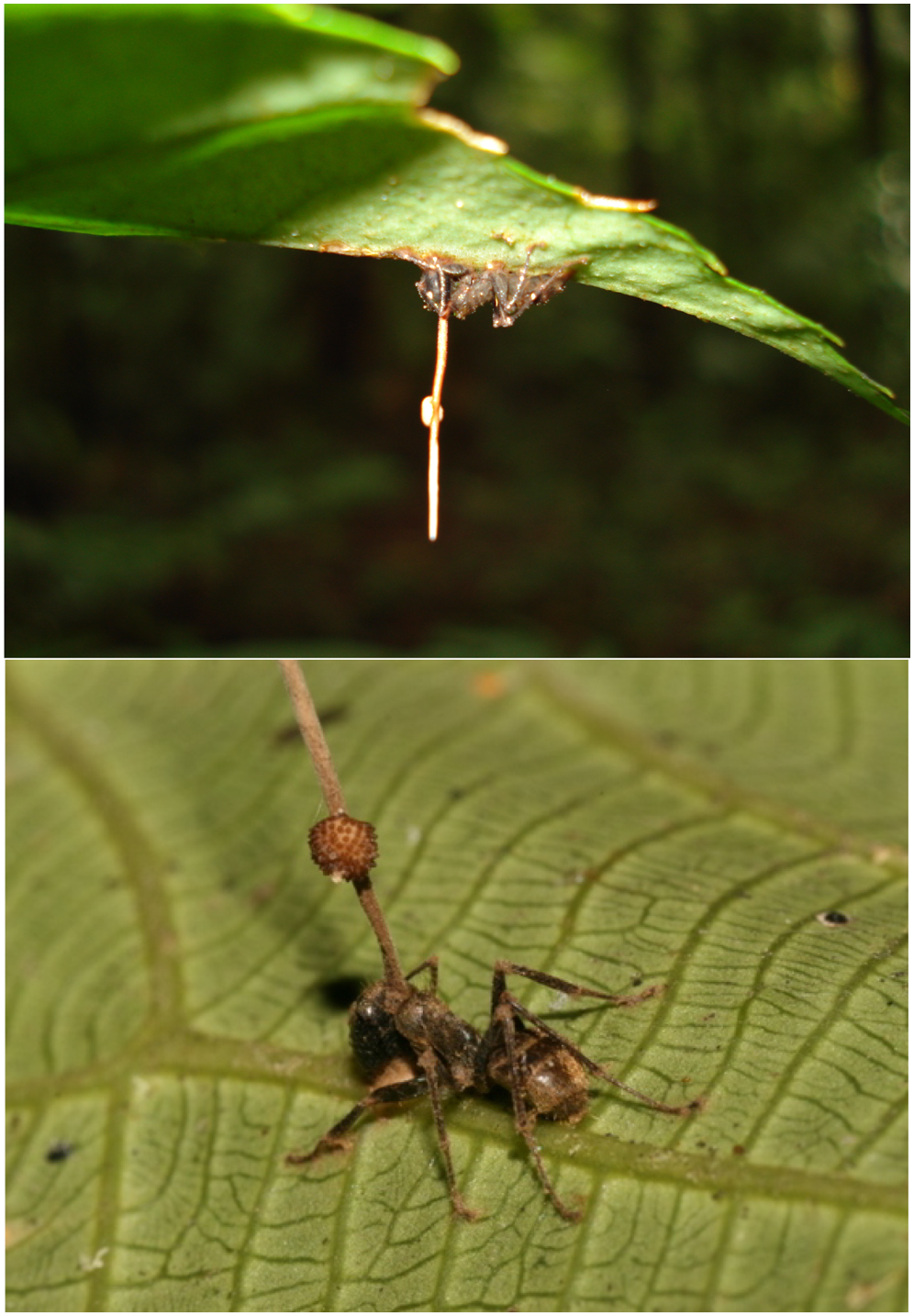
Top: Ant infected with Ophiocordyceps unilateralis fungus clinging to underside of leaf with fungus sprouting from its head. Bottom: Detail of Ophiocordyceps unilateralis sprouting from ants head.

Interactions between fungi and insects are incredibly common and most of these relationships are either commensal or pathogenic.

=== Commensal ===
The commensal relationships typically benefit the insect by allowing them to digest tough materials such as wood. For example, wood-ingesting passalid beetle guts are populated with bacteria, yeasts, and other eukaryotic organisms that aid in digestion and nutrient absorption. Without the help of the yeasts to break down xylose from plant cells, these beetles would be unable to efficiently digest this tough material.

=== Pathogenic ===
Insect pathogenic fungi slowly kill their hosts while replicating rapidly inside the infected insect. They typically attach to the external surface of the insect as spores before germinating, perforating the cuticle, and colonizing the internal cavity. The insect is typically killed and new spores are dispersed from the reproductive structures in the body of the insect.

A prominent example of an entomopathogenic fungus is Ophiocordyceps unilateralis, nicknamed the "zombie-ant" fungus. The fungus infects ants and alters their natural behavioral patterns causing the ant to leave their usual environment in the trees in favor of the forest floor – a more suitable environment for fungal growth. The insects will then attach themselves to the underside of a leaf until it dies. Fungal spores then sprout out of the dead ant's head and are dispersed.

One of the first descriptions of insect pathogenic fungi was published in 1835 during an infestation of Beauveria bassiana in a silkworm population that upset the silk industry.

== Humans ==
There is a low abundance of fungi associated with most human body sites, such as the gastrointestinal tract, where fungi typically compose just 0.001 - 0.1% of the microbial community. However, fungi compose a significant fraction of the microbiome at some locations, such as the ear canal.

The mycobiome is relevant to human physiology as fungi may be important in maintaining microbial community structure, metabolic function, and immune-priming. Mutualism between humans and fungi is not yet well understood, and there is much to be learned about how fungi interact with the nonfungal constituents of the microbiome.

Many human diseases, including hepatitis, cystic fibrosis, obesity, and inflammatory bowel disease have been associated with changes in the human mycobiome, and it has been proposed that any fungal colonization of the GI tract is a sign of disease. Moreover, detecting tumor-associated mycobiomes may be a novel way of cancer screening – it could be used in synergy with other biomarkers such as of bacteriomes.

Fungal interactions in the human host can be opportunistic, mutualistic, parasitic, commensalistic, and amensalistic. Though there is a small amount of fungi considered to be true pathogens due to causing disease in healthy individuals, the majority of fungi are considered opportunistic, only affecting an immunosuppressed host. In these cases, pathogen-mediated damage is dependent upon the host; disease could only occur if the host has either a hyperactive or weakened immune system. Commensal relationships between human host and pathogen are possible when the fungi are present in a host for long periods of time without causing disease. One example of a fungus that forms a commensal relationship in a human host is Cryptococcus. Candida albicans can also form a long-time commensal relationship with its host.

Some fungi are niche specific symbionts in the human host. Some fungi can be introduced to the host from the environment by skin contact, oral or respiratory routes, while others are acquired vertically through birth.

In the human GI tract, there are about 50 observed genera of fungi. Some are acquired through diet; as such showing that the stability of the fungal population is dependent on the diet of the host and host immune status.

About 20 genera of fungi have been observed in the vaginal niche. Most fungi that colonize the vagina show a commensalistic relationship with the host, but factors like antibiotic uses and pregnancy could influence the vaginal mycobiome.
