= Cetacean microbiome =

Group of communities of microorganisms that reside within whales

The cetacean microbiome is the group of communities of microorganisms that reside within whales.

Microbiomes play an important role in individual health and ecology and in particular in the discovery of different microbiomes in gut, skin and nose permitted to analyze their conditions and the condition of the Microbiome environment in which they live.

== Gut ==
The access of microbial samples from the gut out of marine mammals is limited because most species are rare, endangered, and deep divers. There are different techniques for sampling the cetacean's gut microbiome. The most common is collecting fecal samples from the environment and taking a probe from the center that is non-contaminated. There are also studies from rectal swabs and rare studies from stranded dead or living animals direct from the intestine.

The intestinal microbiome of Cetaceans is a complex ecosystem that plays an important role in the metabolism, health, and immunity of the host. The microbial communities of marine mammals are diverse and distinct from terrestrial mammals, and the community depends on different factors like kind of diet, phylogeny, health, and age.

As the microbiome is involved in the decomposition of food, diet is a predominant factor for the microbial community. Different studies have shown that members of Bacteroidetes and Firmicutes are the most abundant phyla of gut microorganisms in animals that are cephalopod predators or zooplankton predators like in short-finned pilot whales and baleen whales. Especially the genus Bacteroides (phyla Bacteroidetes) seems to play a major role in the decomposition of the chitin-rich diet of these species and were also found in the gut microbiome of baleen whales.

In toothed cetacean species which food consumption is mainly piscivore the most abundant phyla are Firmicutes, Fusobacteria, and Proteobacteria. Proteobacteria are classified as a minor important group for marine mammals that consume cephalopods and zooplankton but are highly abundant in piscivorous predators like bottlenose dolphins, East Asian finless porpoises, and belugas. These findings could mirror the different dietary niches of these species.

Besides the dietary also the age seems to determine the differences in the microbial community between cetaceans. Maron et al. have shown that the microbial community is changing in right whale caves during their development. Interestingly the genera Bilophila, Peptococcus, and Treponema are more abundant in older calves. The higher abundance of Bilophila might be a response to the greater milk intake of the older calves.

== Skin ==
The skin is the first barrier that protects the individual from the outside world and the epidermal microbiome on it is considered an indicator not only of the health of the animal but is also considered an ecological indicator that shows the state of the surrounding environment. Knowing the microbiome of the skin of marine mammals under ''normal'' conditions has allowed us to understand how these communities are different from the free microbial communities found in the sea and how they can change according to abiotic and biotic variations, and also ''communities vary between healthy and sick individuals''.

Different studies on migratory marine mammals in particular Megaptera novaeangliae, killer whales, Orcinus orca, and Beluga whales, which are exposed to different habitats host different communities of Bacterioplankton and in many cases diatoms growing on the backs of migrating killer whales.

Although studies on the microbiome of the skin of these marine mammals are quite limited, thanks to the amplification of SSU rRNA genes, were discovered communities belonging to the phylum Bacteroidetes, in particular of the family Flavobacteriaceae, the genus Tenacibaculum dicentrarchi, and it seems that the role of these bacteria is to regulate the microbiome present on the skin of marine mammals, acting as predators and limit the exponential growth of other communities.

Another type of bacterium found on the skin of cetaceans is Phychrobacter, able to tolerate low temperatures and therefore present during migratory routes to high latitudes, it was also discovered that this bacterium is one of those controlled by T. dicentrarchi; while in skin lesions the bacterium spp. Moraxella was found, but not only also in healthy skin such as blowholes and mouths of dolphins

It is not well known whether these communities of microorganisms are transient colonizers of the skin surface or have adapted to that environment, thus subjecting themselves to variations in extrinsic and intrinsic factors that go to change the communities of the skin microbiome, such as UV rays, skin detachment, which seems to be involved in the change of the microbial communities, the change of pressure and temperature, which influences a regional and temporal variability of the skin microbiome, the sex, the age and the health status of the individual, all influence the microbiome and the change of the skin communities. In conjunction with these factors, climate change has been shown to further influence the growth and presence of certain bacterial communities as well as the health status of these cetaceans.

== Respiratory system ==
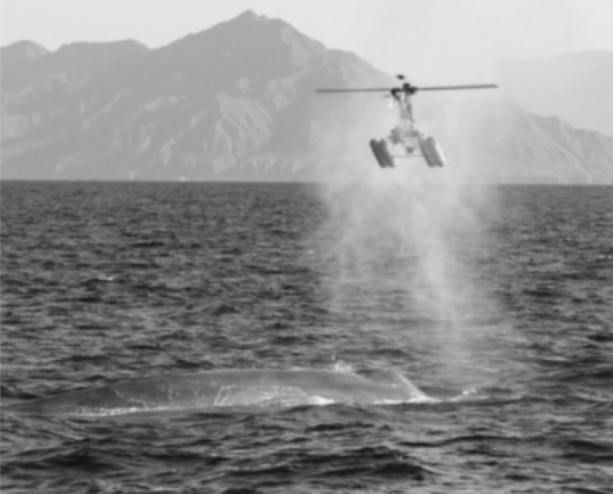
Collection of blow from a blue whale using a radio-controlled helicopter

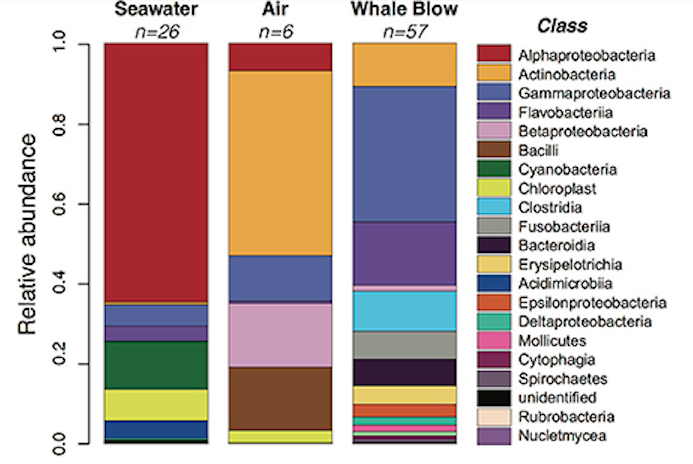
Relative abundance of taxonomic classes identified as whale-, air- or seawater-specific in each sample type.

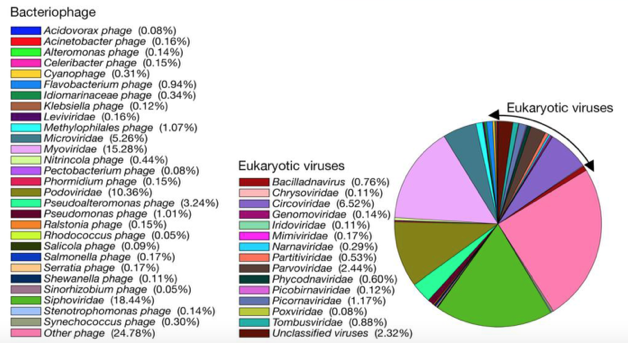
Relative abundance of viruses and their taxonomic families. This included 42 viral families, including 29 families of bacteriophage. Percentages indicate relative abundance of all viruses in the sequence library.

=== Impact of cetacean respiratory system microbiome ===
The cetaceans are in danger because they are affected by multiple stress factors, especially anthropogenature, which make them more vulnerable to various diseases. These animals have been noted to show high susceptibility to airway infections, but very little is known about their respiratory microbiome. Therefore, the sampling of the exhaled breath or "blow" of the cetaceans can provide an assessment of the state of health. Blow is composed of a mixture of microorganisms and organic material, including lipids, proteins, and cellular debris derived from the linings of the airways which, when released into the relatively cooler outdoor air, condense to form a visible mass of vapor, which can be collected. There are various methods for collecting exhaled breath samples, one of the most recent is through the use of aerial drones. This method provides a safer, quieter, and less invasive alternative and often a cost-effective option for monitoring fauna and flora. The use of aerial drones has been more successful with large cetaceans due to slow swim speeds and larger blow sizes.

In all the studies carried out, in addition to exhaled breath samples, seawater and air samples were collected to more accurately identify the specific microorganisms for exhaled breath.

Through various studies carried out on different cetaceans, among which, Humpback whales (Megaptera novaeangliae), Blue whale (Balænoptera musculus), Gray whale (Eschrichtius robustus), Sperm whale (Physeter macrocephalus), Killer whale ( Orcinus orca) and bottlenose dolphins (Tursiops truncatus), the respiratory microbiome has begun to be defined, i.e., a microbial community formed by a complex diversity of common microorganisms to all the specimens examined. These are very recent studies, so knowledge is very limited, only some microorganisms are known while others have not yet been identified and little is known about their functional role within these animals. Overall, the most common bacteria identified at the phylum level included Pseudomonadota, Bacillota, Actinomycetota, and Bacteroidota.

=== Types of bacteria found in the respiratory systems of cetaceans ===
Among the Pseudomonadota, bacteria belonging to the families Brucellaceae and Enterobacteriaceae and to the genera "Candidatus Pelagibacter", Acidovorax, Cardiobacterium, Pseudomonas, Burkholderia, and Psychrobacter have been recognized.

Among the Bacillota, bacteria belonging to the Clostridia and Erysipelotrichia classes and to the genera Anoxybacillus, Paenibacillus and Leptotrichia have been recognized.

Bacteria belonging to the Acidimicrobiia class, to the Microbacteriaceae family, and to the genera Corynebacterium, Mycobacterium and Propionibacterium (Cutibacterium), have been recognized among the Actinomycetota.

Among the Bacteroidota, bacteria belonging to the genus Tenacibaculum have been recognized.

To these are added bacteria belonging to the phylum Fusobacteriota and Mycoplasmatota.

Finally, potential respiratory pathogens were also detected, such as Balneatrix (proteobacteria) and a range of Gram-positive Clostridia and Bacilli, such as Staphylococcus and Streptococcus (both firmicutes). Furthermore, one of the most common bacteria in the various cetacean species is the Haemophilus bacterium. These are opportunistic gram-negative coccobacilli, also found in the respiratory tract of humans and other animals, which tend to colonize but without causing the onset of infection. But during periods of immunosuppression these organisms can cause damage by generating meningitis and pneumonia.

In addition to bacteria, some viruses have also been identified in whale exhaled breath. Among the most abundant bacteriophages were the Siphoviridae and Myoviridae, while among the viral families there were small single-stranded DNA viruses (ss), in particular the Circoviridae, members of the Parvoviridae, and a family of RNA viruses, the Tombusviridae.
