= Adaptive strategies =

The expression adaptive strategies is used by anthropologist Yehudi Cohen to describe a society's system of economic production. Cohen argued that the most important reason for similarities between two (or more) unrelated societies is their possession of a similar adaptive strategy. In other words, similar economic causes have similar sociocultural effects.

For example, there are clear similarities among societies that have a foraging (hunting and gathering) strategy. Cohen developed a typology of societies based on correlations between their economies and their social features. His typology includes these five adaptive strategies: foraging, horticulture, agriculture, pastoralism, and industrialism.

Until 10,000 years ago people everywhere were foragers. However, environmental differences did create contrasts among the world's foragers. Some, like the people who lived in Europe during the ice ages, were big game hunters. Today, hunters in the Arctic still focus on large animals and herd animals; they have much less vegetation and variety in their diets than do tropical foragers. The foraging way of life held on in certain forests, deserts, islands, and very cold areas–-places where food production was not practicable with simple technology.

Horticulture and agriculture are the two types of cultivation found in nonindustrial societies. Both differ from the farming systems of industrial nations like the United States and Canada, which use large land areas, machinery, and petrochemicals. According to Cohen, horticulture is cultivation that does not make any intensive use of the usual factors of production: land, labor, capital, and machinery. Agriculture is a type of cultivation that requires more labor than horticulture does, because it uses land intensively and continuously. The greater labor demands associated with agriculture reflect its use of domesticated animals, irrigation, and/or terracing.

Pastoralists live in North Africa, the Middle East, Europe, Asia, and sub-Saharan Africa. These herders are people whose activities focus on such domesticated animals such as cattle, sheep, goats, camels, yak, and reindeer. Industrialization is the transformation of “traditional” into “modern” societies through industrialization of the economy. Wealthy people sought investment opportunities and eventually found them in machines and engines to drive machines. Industrialization increased production in both farming and manufacturing.

== Sources ==
- Conrad Philip Kottak, "Windows on Humanity"
