= Culturomics (microbiology) =

Culturomics is the high-throughput cell culture of bacteria that aims to comprehensively identify strains or species in samples obtained from tissues such as the human gut or from the environment. This approach was conceived as an alternative, complementary method to metagenomics, which relies on the presence of homologous sequences to identify new bacteria. Due to the limited phylogenetic information available on bacteria, metagenomic data generally contains large amounts of "microbial dark matter", sequences of unknown origin. Culturomics provides some of the missing gaps with the added advantage of enabling the functional study of the generated cultures. Its main drawback is that many bacterial species remain effectively uncultivable until their growth conditions are better understood. Therefore, optimization of the culturomics approach has been done by improving culture conditions.

Unlike metagenomics, which relies on direct shotgun sequencing or 16S rRNA gene sequencing, culturomics is based on matrix-assisted laser desorption/ionization–time-of-flight (MALDI-TOF) mass spectrometry. However, culturomics also uses 16S RNA sequencing to identify new species.

== See also ==
- Genomics
- Microbiota
