= Colony hybridization =

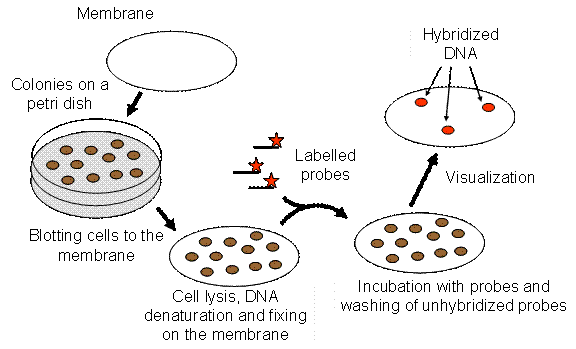
The process of colony hybridization: growth of cell colonies, replication on filter, hybridization, and identification of desired colonies.

Colony hybridization is a method of selecting bacterial colonies with desired genes through a straightforward cloning and transfer process. The genes of interest have been added to a bacterial plasmid previously through recombination, allowing genes from other organisms to be analyzed within a bacterial colony. The overall process involves a transfer of genetic material from one medium to another, typically using nitrocellulose filter paper, with the intended goal of identifying and isolating a specific gene. Radiographed RNA is used to find the desired sequence within the new bacterial colony and essentially "light it up" so that the sequence can be identified for transfer. The most common purpose of colony hybridization is to verify that a certain DNA sequence was able to successfully enter into a new cell, meaning that the cells being analyzed through this method are the result of recombination between a specific piece of DNA and a bacterial plasmid. This method was discovered by Michael Grunstein and David S. Hogness.

== Methods ==
Colony hybridization begins with a desire to extract a segment of DNA containing a specific gene, such as a gene that conveys antibiotic resistance. A specific piece of DNA is removed from its respective cell culture and inserted into a bacterial plasmid via a process known as recombination. These bacterial plasmids are cultured on a nutrient agar plate, leading to the formation of bacterial colonies, some of which ideally continue to contain the gene of interest. A nitrocellulose filter is then washed three times with distilled water, placed in between absorbent sheets, and heated at high temperatures to kill bacteria or other microorganism. This filter, which has a pore size of .45 μm, undergoes these processes to ensure that there is no contamination during the transfer, thus allowing for accuracy in results. The bacterial colonies are then symmetrically replicated onto the nitrocellulose filter by direct contact. At this point, the cells on the filter membrane are lysed in order to open up the plasmids for easier access and their DNA is denatured, which allows it to bind to the filter. These DNA clusters are then hybridized to a desired radioactively-labelled RNA or DNA probe and screened by autoradiography. The RNA (or DNA) probe was selected specifically beforehand based on the DNA carrying the desired gene, since the probe must contain the complementary strand that will allow it to bind accurately to the correct genetic material. Through use of the radioactive probe, the clusters that exhibit the desired gene are identified to be used in further research. Frequently, they are then matched up to the corresponding (living) bacterial colonies, which have not undergone the cell lysis procedure, which may also be isolated for further growth and experimentation.

== History ==
The initial discovery of this technique used Drosophila melanogaster DNA segments as the genetic material of choice, which was placed into a plasmid of E. Coli. The purpose, as described in the 1975 publication by Michael Grunstein and David S. Hogness, references the prior inability of isolating a specific desired sequence out of a hybridized cell, thus prompting them to pursue steps in order to make this a possibility. They came to the conclusion that the technique they had developed, which would be named colony hybridization, was suitable for the isolation of any DNA segment given that the correct complementary RNA is available to identify the selected sequence.

Several years later, in 1978, Brigitte Cami and Philippe Kourilsky performed further experiments too increase the efficiency of colony hybridization, specifically by increasing the numbers of bacterial colonies per plate. The procedure they developed used a prophage that is thermally induced in order to lyse all of the cells on the plate. By developing this technique, Cami and Kourilsky sped up the process of colony hybridization and prevented each colony from having to be hybridized individually, which was the case in the earliest procedures.

== Common uses ==
There are countless uses available for colony hybridization techniques but there are a few publications from recent years that highlight the use of this process in unconventional ways. In 2006 the Department of Microbiology and Immunology in British Columbia published a paper detailing the use of colony hybridization as a form of wastewater treatment. The purpose of the experimental procedure was to decide if this process was suitable for accurately screening for specific DNA samples within wastewater, since there are a significant number of colonies that can be screened at one time. There have also been many different DNA hybridization techniques utilized in the analysis of infectious diseases. N. gonorrhoeae and C. trachomatis are two different well-known diseases that been recommended for analysis with colony hybridization techniques by national health organizations, including the Centers for Disease Control. These are just a few specific examples detailing exactly how colony hybridization can be used in different scientific fields and for a variety of purposes.
