= Marine holobiont =

The holobiont concept is a renewed paradigm in biology that can help to describe and understand complex systems, like the host-microbe interactions that play crucial roles in marine ecosystems. However, there is still little understanding of the mechanisms that govern these relationships, the evolutionary processes that shape them and their ecological consequences. The holobiont concept posits that a host and its associated microbiota with which it interacts, form a holobiont, and have to be studied together as a coherent biological and functional unit to understand its biology, ecology, and evolution.

== History ==
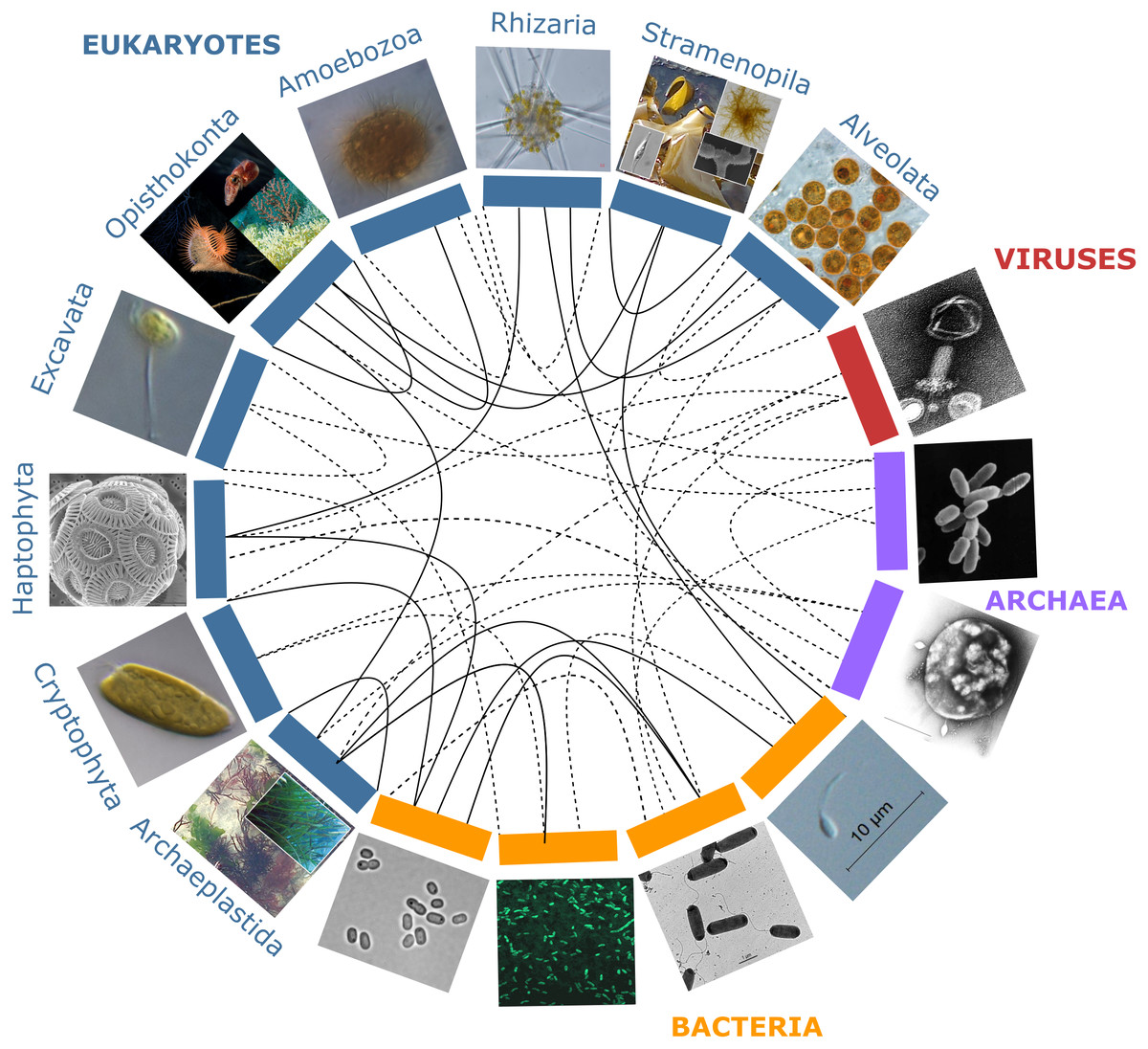
Partners forming marine holobionts

The idea of holism started to regain popularity in biology when the endosymbiosis theory was first proposed by Konstantin Mereschkowski in 1905 and further developed by Ivan Wallin in 1925. Still accepted today, this theory posits a single origin for eukaryotic cells through the symbiotic assimilation of prokaryotes to form first mitochondria and later plastids (the latter through several independent symbiotic events) via phagocytosis (reviewed in Archibald, 2015). These ancestral and founding symbiotic events, which prompted the metabolic and cellular complexity of eukaryotic life, most likely occurred in the ocean.

Despite the general acceptance of the endosymbiosis theory, the term holobiosis or holobiont did not immediately enter the scientific vernacular. It was coined independently by the German Adolf Meyer-Abich in 1943, and by Lynn Margulis in 1990, who proposed that evolution has worked mainly through symbiosis-driven leaps that merged organisms into new forms, referred to as "holobionts", and only secondarily through gradual mutational changes. However, the concept was not widely used until it was co-opted by coral biologists over a decade later. Corals and the dinoflagellate algae called Zooxanthellae are one of the most iconic examples of symbioses found in nature; most corals are incapable of long-term survival without the products of photosynthesis provided by their endosymbiotic algae. Rohwer et al. (2002) were the first to use the word holobiont to describe a unit of selection sensu Margulis for corals, where the holobiont comprised the cnidarian polyp (host), Zooxanthellae algae, various ectosymbionts (endolithic algae, prokaryotes, fungi, other unicellular eukaryotes), and viruses.

Although initially driven by studies of marine organisms, much of the research on the emerging properties and significance of holobionts has since been carried out in other fields of research: the microbiota of the rhizosphere of plants or the animal gut became predominant models and have led to an ongoing paradigm shift in agronomy and medical sciences. Holobionts occur in terrestrial and aquatic habitats alike, and several analogies between these ecosystems can be made. For example, in all of these habitats, interactions within and across holobionts such as induction of chemical defenses, nutrient acquisition, or biofilm formation are mediated by chemical cues and signals in the environment, dubbed infochemicals. Nevertheless, we can identify two major differences between terrestrial and aquatic systems. First, the physicochemical properties of water result in higher chemical connectivity and signaling between macro- and micro-organisms in aquatic or moist environments. In marine ecosystems, carbon fluxes also appear to be swifter and trophic modes more flexible, leading to higher plasticity of functional interactions across holobionts. Moreover, dispersal barriers are usually lower, allowing for faster microbial community shifts in marine holobionts. Secondly, phylogenetic diversity at broad taxonomic scales (i.e., supra-kingdom, kingdom and phylum levels), is higher in aquatic realms compared to land, with much of the aquatic diversity yet to be uncovered, especially marine viruses.

== Russian Doll complexity ==
The boundaries of holobionts are usually delimited by a physical gradient, which corresponds to the area of local influence of the host, e.g., in unicellular algae the so-called phycosphere. However, they may also be defined in a context-dependent way as a Russian matryoshka doll, setting the boundaries of the holobiont depending on the interactions and biological functions that are being considered. Thus holobionts may encompass all levels of host-symbiont associations from intimate endosymbiosis with a high degree of co-evolution up to the community and ecosystem level; a concept referred to as "nested ecosystems" (see diagram).

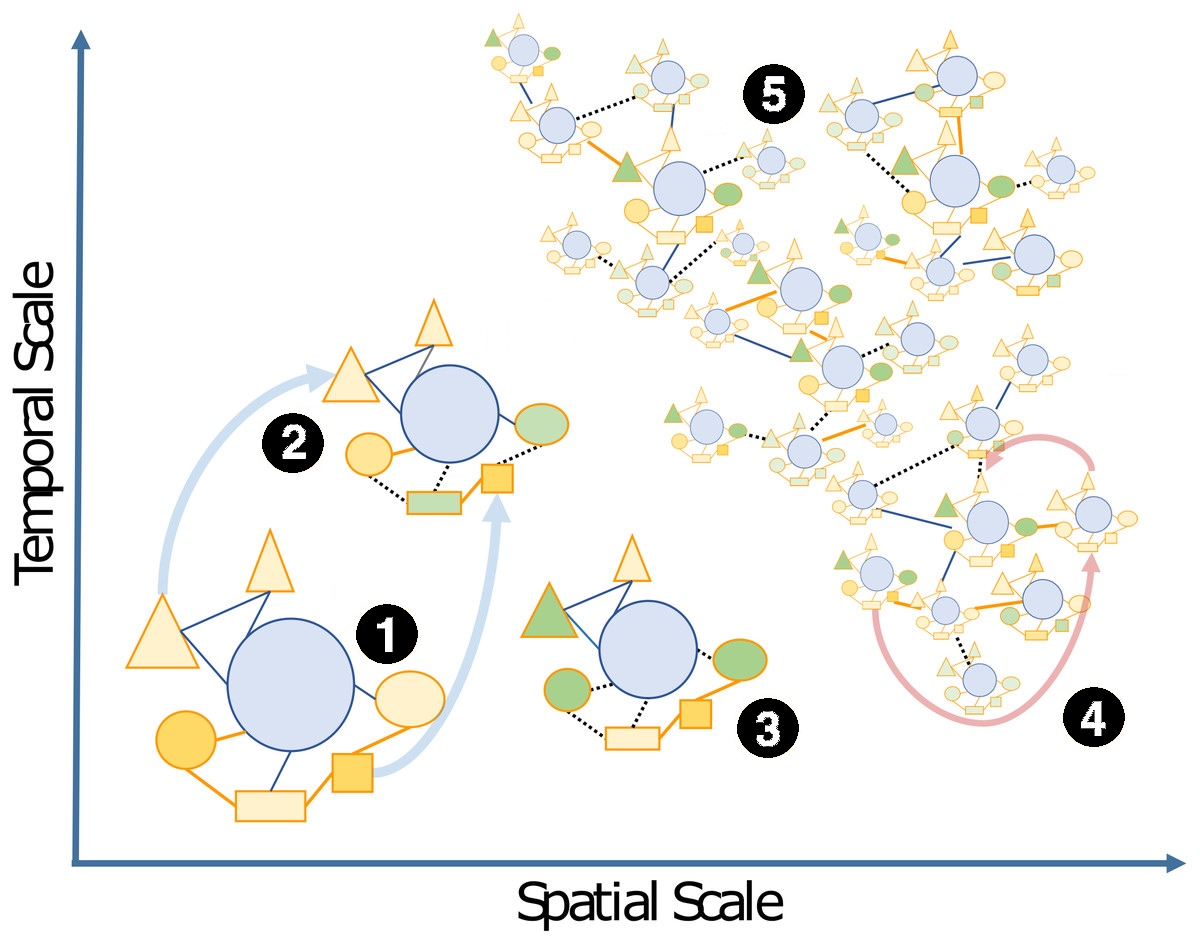
Schematic view of the "Russian Doll" complexity and dynamics of holobionts, according to diverse spatiotemporal scales (see text below or left for explanation)

In the diagram, the host (blue circles), and associated microbes (all other shapes) including bacteria and eukaryotes that may be inside (i.e., endosymbiotic) or outside the host (i.e., ectosymbiotic) are connected by either beneficial (solid orange lines), neutral (solid blue lines) or pathogenic (dashed black lines) interactions, respectively. Changes from beneficial or neutral to pathogenic interactions are typical cases of dysbiosis. The different clusters are illustrated by the following examples: 1, a model holobiont in a stable physiological condition (e.g., in controlled laboratory condition); 2 and 3, holobionts changing during their life cycle or subjected to stress conditions—examples of vertically transmitted microbes are indicated by light blue arrows; 4 and 5, marine holobionts in the context of global sampling campaigns or long-term time series—examples of horizontal transmission of microbes and holobionts are illustrated by pink arrows.

Such a conceptual perspective raises fundamental questions not only regarding the interaction between the different components of holobionts and processes governing their dynamics, but also of the relevant units of selection and the role of coevolution. For instance, plant and animal evolution involves new functions co-constructed by members of the holobiont or elimination of functions redundant among them, and it is likely that these processes are also relevant in marine holobionts. Eugene Rosenberg et al. have argued that all animals and plants can be considered holobionts, and thus advocate the hologenome theory of evolution, suggesting that natural selection acts at the level of the holobiont and its hologenome. This interpretation of Margulis' definition of a holobiont considerably broadened fundamental concepts in evolution and speciation and has not been free of criticism, especially when applied at the community or ecosystem level. More recently, it has been shown that species that interact indirectly with the host can also be important in shaping coevolution within mutualistic multi-partner assemblages. Thus, the holobiont concept and the underlying complexity of holobiont systems should be better defined and further considered when addressing evolutionary and ecological questions.

== Marine holobiont models ==
- Environmental models: Within the animal kingdom, and in addition to corals and sponges, the discovery of deep-sea hydrothermal vents revealed symbioses of animals with chemosynthetic bacteria that have later been found in many other marine ecosystems and frequently exhibit high levels of metabolic and taxonomic diversity. In the SAR supergroup, in addition to well-known models such as diatoms, radiolarians and foraminiferans, both heterotrophic protist dwellers harboring endosymbiotic microalgae, are emerging as ecological models for unicellular photosymbiosis due to their ubiquitous presence in the world's oceans. Among the haptophytes, the cosmopolitan Emiliania huxleyi, promoted by associated bacteria, produces key intermediates in the carbon and sulfur biogeochemical cycles, making it an important model phytoplankton species. Finally, within the Archaeplastida, the siphonous green alga Bryopsis is an example of a model that harbors heterotrophic endosymbiotic bacteria, some of which exhibit patterns of co-evolution with their hosts.
- Controlled bi- or trilateral associations: Only a few models, covering a small part of the overall marine biodiversity, are currently being cultivated ex-situ and can be used in fully controlled experiments, where they can be cultured aposymbiotically. The flatworm Symsagittifera roscoffensis, the sea anemone Exaiptasia, the upside-down jellyfish Cassiopea, and their respective intracellular green and dinoflagellate algae have, in addition to corals, become models for fundamental research on evolution of animal-algal photosymbiosis. In particular, the sea anemone Exaiptasia has been used to explore photobiology disruption and restoration of cnidarian symbioses. The Vibrio-squid model provides insights into the effect of microbiota on animal development, circadian rhythms, and immune systems/ The unicellular green alga Ostreococcus, an important marine primary producer, has been shown to exchange vitamins with specific associated bacteria. The green macroalga Ulva mutabilis has enabled the exploration of bacteria-mediated growth and morphogenesis including the identification of original chemical interactions in the holobiont. Although the culture conditions in these highly controlled model systems differ from the natural environment, these systems are essential to gain elementary mechanistic understanding of the functioning, the roles, and the evolution of marine holobionts.

== Example holobionts ==
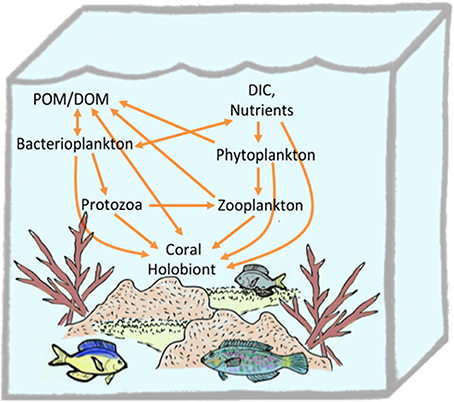
Coral holobiont

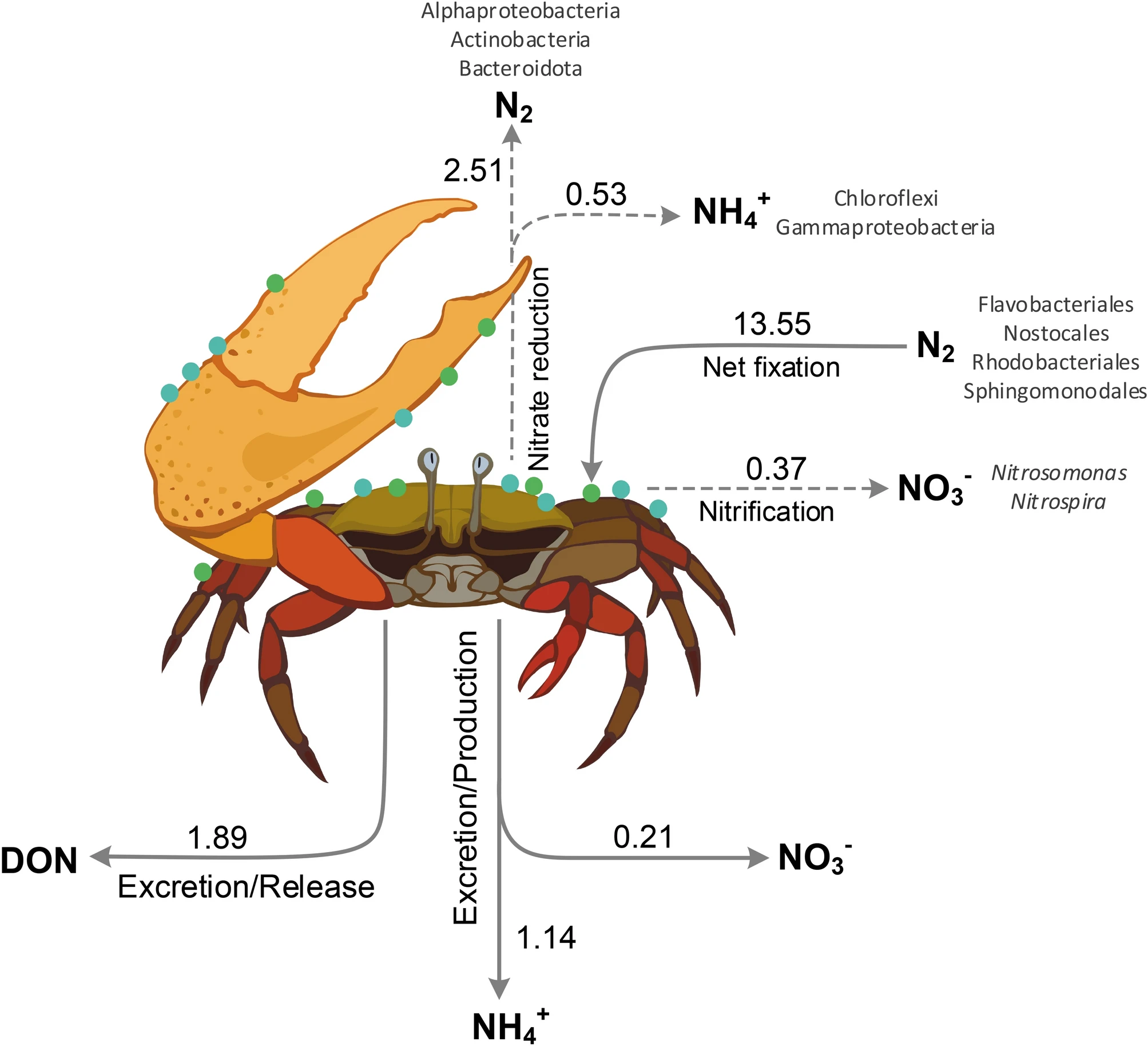
Mangrove crab holobiont

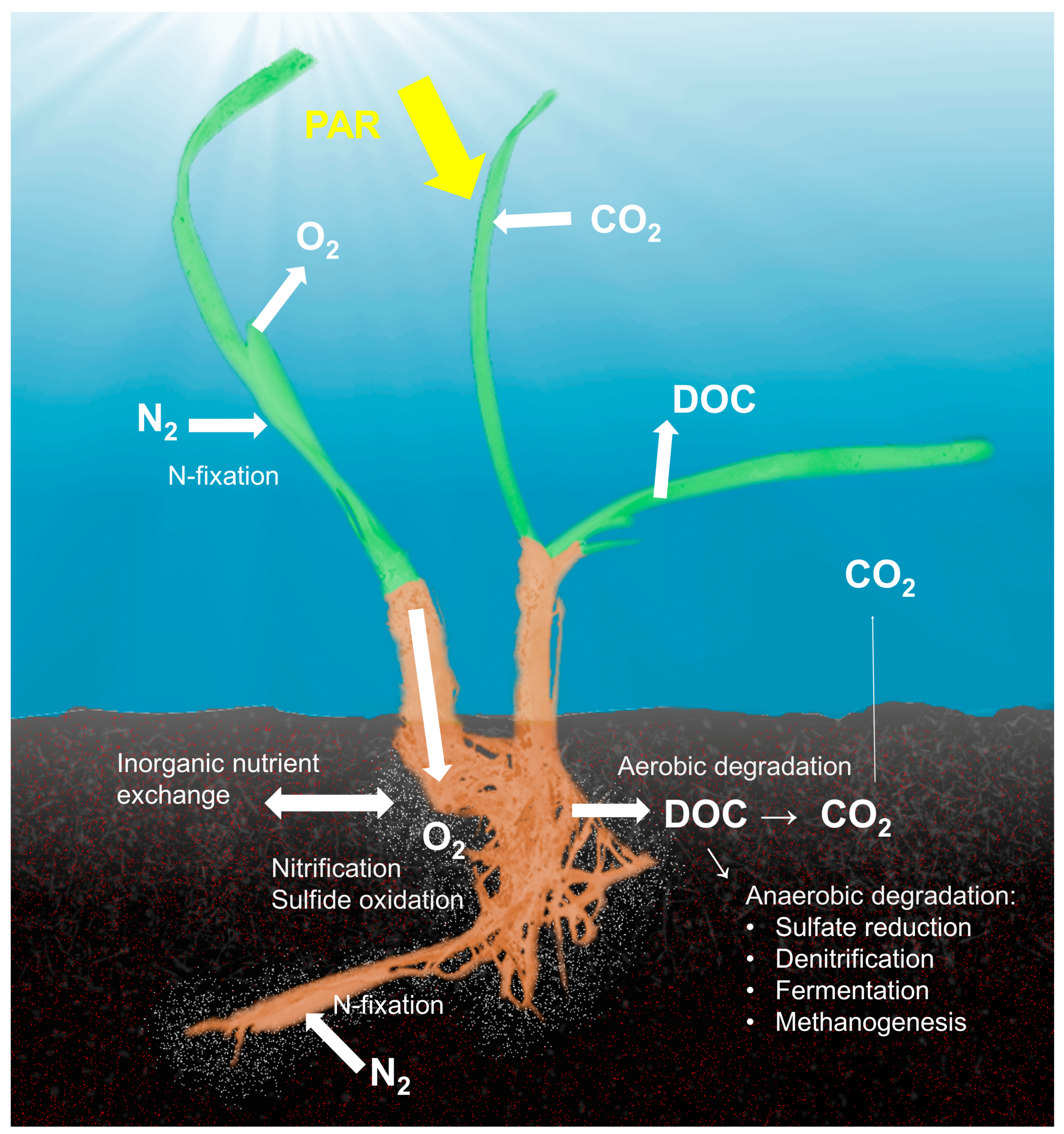
Seagrass holobiont

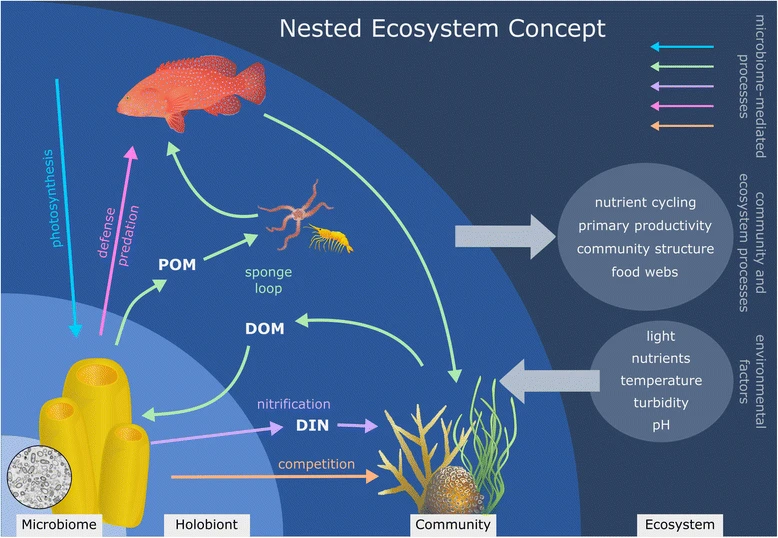
Sponge holobiont

== Influence on ecological processes ==
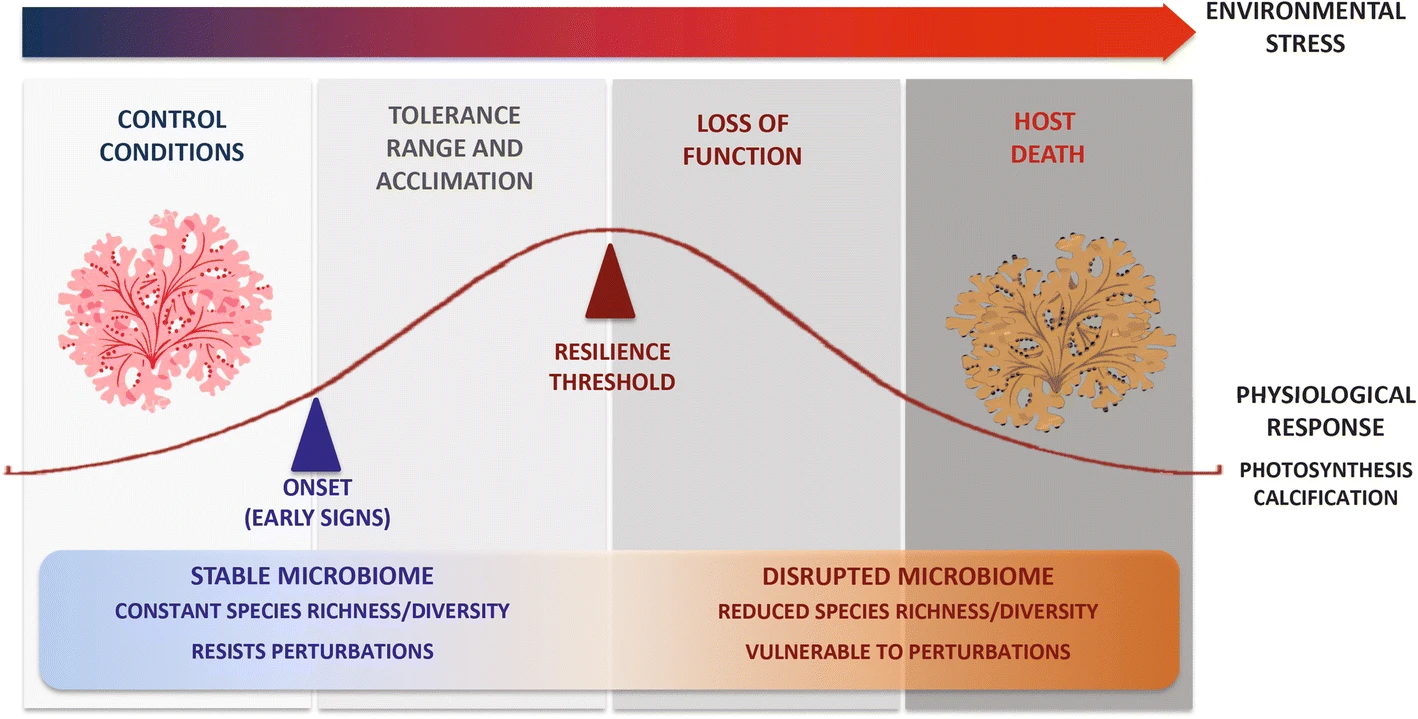
Climate change and the rhodolith holobiont

Work on model systems has demonstrated that motile and macroscopic marine holobionts can act as dissemination vectors for geographically restricted microbial taxa. Pelagic mollusks or vertebrates are textbook examples of high dispersal capacity organisms (e.g., against currents and through stratified water layers). It has been estimated that fish and marine mammals may enhance the original dispersion rate of their microbiota by a factor of 200 to 200,000 and marine birds may even act as bio-vectors across ecosystem boundaries. This host-driven dispersal of microbes can include non-native or invasive species as well as pathogens.

A related ecological function of holobionts is their potential to sustain rare species. Hosts provide an environment that favors the growth of specific microbial communities distinct from the surrounding environment (including rare microbes). They may, for instance, provide a nutrient-rich niche in the otherwise nutrient-poor surroundings.

Lastly, biological processes regulated by microbes are important drivers of global biogeochemical cycles. In the open ocean, it is estimated that symbioses with the cyanobacterium UCYN-A contribute about 20% to total N_{2} fixation. In benthic systems, sponges and corals may support entire ecosystems via their involvement in nutrient cycling thanks to their microbial partners, functioning as sinks and sources of nutrients. In particular the "sponge loop" recycles dissolved organic matter and makes it available to higher trophic levels in the form of detritus. In coastal sediments, bivalves hosting methanogenic archaea have been shown to increase the benthic methane efflux by a factor of up to eight, potentially accounting for 9.5% of total methane emissions from the Baltic Sea. This metabolic versatility is accomplished because of the simultaneous occurrence of disparate biochemical machineries (e.g., aerobic and anaerobic pathways) in individual symbionts, providing new metabolic abilities to the holobiont, such as the synthesis of specific essential amino acids, photosynthesis, or chemosynthesis. Furthermore, the interaction between host and microbiota can potentially extend the metabolic capabilities of a holobiont in a way that augments its resilience to environmental changes, or allow it to cross biotope boundaries (e.g., Woyke et al., 2006) and colonize extreme environments (Bang et al., 2018). Holobionts thus contribute to marine microbial diversity and possibly resilience in the context of global environmental changes and it is paramount to include the holobiont concept in predictive models that investigate the consequences of human impacts on the marine realm and its biogeochemical cycles.

== Holobiont assembly and regulation ==
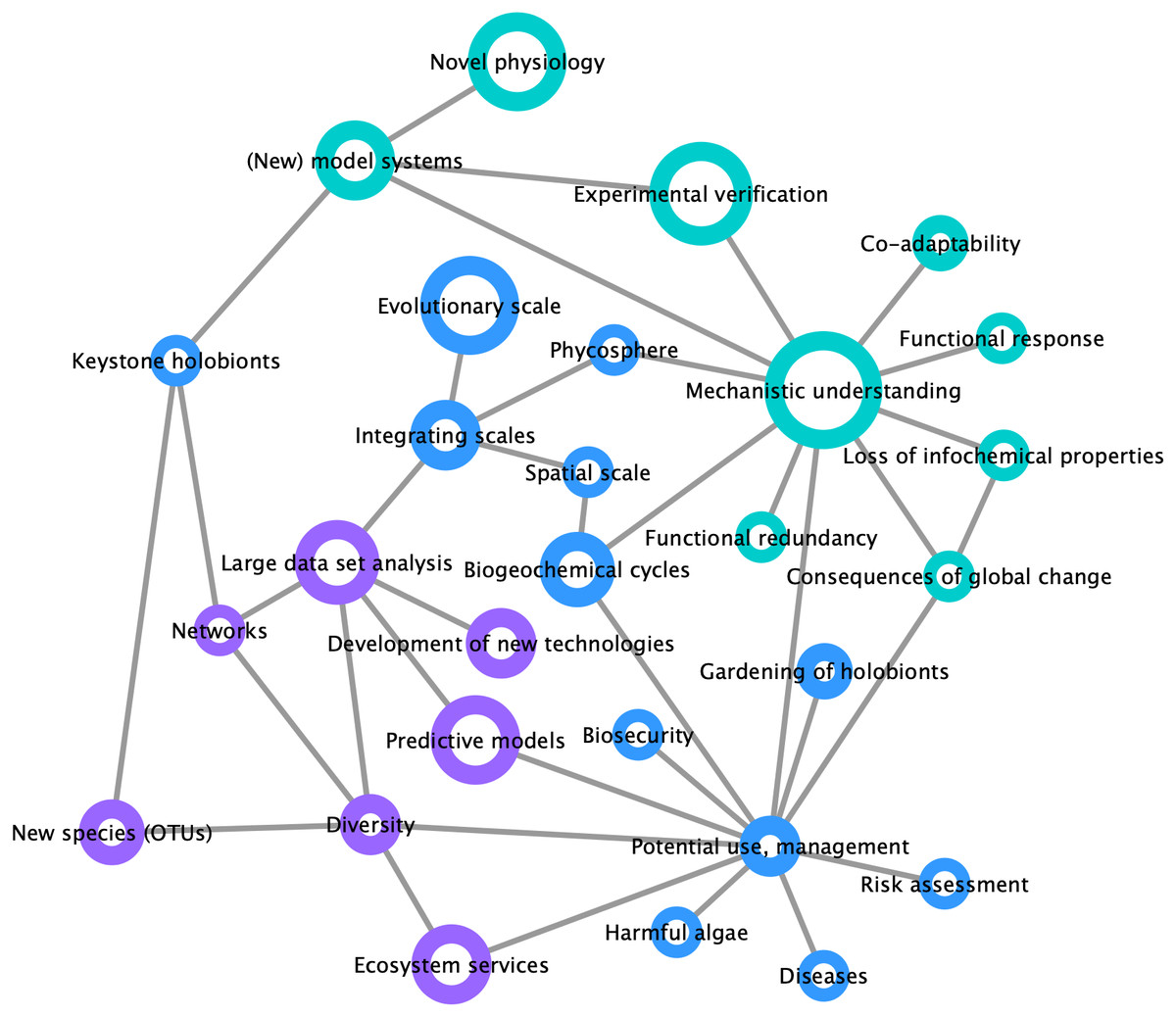
Mind map of concepts related to marine holobionts

Two critical challenges partially addressed by using model systems are (1) to decipher the factors determining holobiont composition and (2) to elucidate the impacts and roles of the different partners in these complex systems over time. Some marine organisms such as bivalves transmit part of the microbiota maternally. In other marine holobionts, vertical transmission may be weak and inconsistent, whereas mixed modes of transmission (vertical and horizontal) or intermediate modes (pseudo-vertical, where horizontal acquisition frequently involves symbionts of parental origin) are more common. Identifying the factors shaping holobiont composition and understanding their evolution is highly relevant for marine organisms given that most marine hosts display a high specificity for their microbiota and even patterns of phylosymbiosis, despite a highly connected and microbe-rich environment.

During microbiota transmission (whether vertical or horizontal), selection by the host and/or by other components of the microbiome, is a key process in establishing or maintaining a holobiont microbial community that is distinct from the environment. The immune system of the host, e.g., via the secretion of specific antimicrobial peptides, is one way of performing this selection in both marine and terrestrial holobionts.

Another way of selecting a holobiont microbial community is by chemically mediated microbial gardening. This concept has been demonstrated for land plants, where root exudates manipulate microbiome composition. In marine environments, the phylogenetic diversity of hosts and symbionts suggests both conserved and marine-specific chemical interactions, but studies are still in their infancy. For instance, seaweeds can chemically garden beneficial microbes, facilitating normal morphogenesis and increasing disease resistance, and seaweeds and corals structure their surface-associated microbiome by producing chemoattractants and antibacterial compounds. There are fewer examples of chemical gardening in unicellular hosts, but it seems highly likely that similar processes are in place.

In addition to selection, ecological drift, dispersal and evolutionary diversification have been proposed as key processes in community assembly, but are difficult to estimate in microbial communities. The only data currently at our disposal to quantify these processes are the diversity and distribution of microbes. Considering the high connectivity of aquatic environments, differences in marine microbial communities are frequently attributed to a combination of selection and drift, rather than limited dispersal, a conclusion which in the future could be refined by conceptual models developed for instance for soil microbial communities.) Diversification is mainly considered in the sense of coevolution or adaptation to host selection, which may also be driven by the horizontal acquisition of genes. However, cospeciation is challenging to prove and only few studies have examined this process in marine holobionts to date, each focused on a restricted number of actors.

Perturbations in the transmission or the recruitment of the microbiota can lead to dysbiosis, and eventually microbial infections. Dysbiotic microbial communities are frequently determined by stochastic processes and thus display higher variability in their composition than those of healthy individuals. This observation in line with the "Anna Karenina principle", although there are exceptions to this rule. A specific case of dysbiosis is the so-called "Rasputin effect" where benign endosymbionts opportunistically become detrimental to the host due to processes such as reduction in immune response under food deprivation, coinfections, or environmental pressure. Many diseases are now interpreted as the result of a microbial imbalance and the rise of opportunistic or polymicrobial infections upon host stress. For instance in reef-building corals, warming destabilizes cnidarian-dinoflagellate associations, and some beneficial Symbiodiniacea strains switch their physiology and sequester more resources for their own growth at the expense of the coral host, leading to coral bleaching and even death.

Increasing our knowledge on the contribution of these processes to holobiont community assembly in marine systems is a key challenge, which is of particular urgency today in the context of ongoing global change. Moreover, understanding how the community and functional structure of resident microbes are resilient to perturbations remains critical to predict and promote the health of their host and the ecosystem. Yet, the contribution of the microbiome is still missing in most quantitative models predicting the distribution of marine macro-organisms, or additional information on biological interactions would be required to make the former more accurate.

== Further references ==
- Hurst, Christon J. (5 July 2016). The Rasputin Effect: When Commensals and Symbionts Become Parasitic. Springer. ISBN 978-3-319-28170-4.
