= Eugene Rosenberg =

- יוג'ין רוזנברג
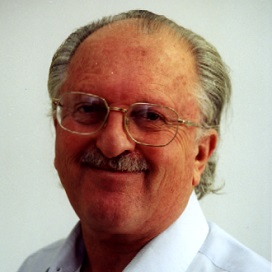
- Born: October 16, 1935 (age 90); New York City
- Education: B.Sc. - UCLA, Ph.D. - Columbia University
- Known for: Myxobacteria, Microorganisms to Combat Pollution, hologenome concept
- Spouse(s): Leah Petlak-Rosenberg (1938-1989), Ilana Zilber-Rosenberg (1942)
- Children: Robin Esther Doron, Stephanie Shosh Rotem, Denise Rosenberg
- Scientific career
- Fields: Microbiology, Biotechnology
- Workplaces: Tel Aviv University

Eugene Rosenberg (Hebrew: יוג'ין רוזנברג; born October 16, 1935) is a microbiologist at the Faculty of Life Sciences at Tel Aviv University, an expert in the field of applied environmental microbiology, in particular his work on Myxobacteria, microorganisms to combat pollution (bioremediation), and the Hologenome theory of evolution - described in his book.

== Early life and education ==
Rosenberg was born in New York City in 1935, grew up in Los Angeles, and immigrated to Israel in 1970. He received his Bachelor of Science from the University of California Los Angeles (UCLA) and his Ph.D. from the Department of Biochemistry at Columbia University, New York (1961). His doctoral thesis, under the supervision of Steven Zamenhof, describes the chemical structures of the capsules of Haemophilus influenzae, types B, E, and F. Rosenberg went on to postdoctoral research in organic chemistry under the guidance of Lord Todd in Cambridge University (1962). Between 1962 and 1970 he was first Assistant and then associate professor of microbiology at UCLA, concentrating on the biochemistry of Myxococcus xanthus. In 1970 he joined the academic staff of the Department of Molecular Microbiology and Biotechnology at Tel Aviv University, where he was appointed Full Professor in 1975 and Professor Emeritus in 2006. He has held the Gol Chair in Applied and Environmental Microbiology since 1989. He served as the editor-in-chief of The Prokaryotes (2013), a comprehensive reference encyclopedia on Bacteria and Archaea.

== Academic ==
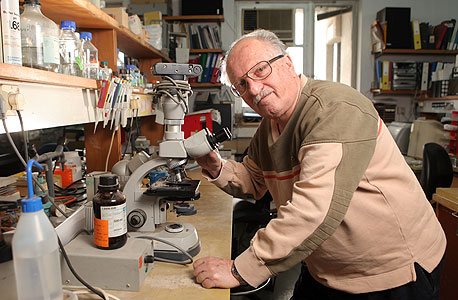
Eugene Rosenberg working in his laboratory

Rosenberg's early work in Israel focused on myxobacteriology, hydrocarbon microbiology, surface-active polymers from Acinetobacter, and bioremediation. In collaboration with his department colleagues Eliora Z. Ron and David Gutnick, he introduced the use of microorganisms and bioemulsifiers to treat oil pollution in oil tankers, pipelines and on beaches. In later years he collaborated with Yossi Loya (Zoology Dept., Tel Aviv University) to research coral disease. They demonstrated for the first time that coral bleaching is the result of an infectious disease and that a rise in temperature due to global warming causes pathogenic microorganisms to be more active and cause infectious epidemic diseases. Together with Ilana Zilber-Rosenberg, he developed the "hologenome concept of evolution". The concept posits that the holobiont (host plus all of its associated microorganisms) and its hologenome (sum of the genetic information of the host and its symbiotic microorganisms), function as a unique biological entity and therefore as a level of selection in evolution. According to the hologenome concept microbial symbionts and the host interact in a cooperative way that affects the health of the holobiont within its environment, and the sum of these cooperative interactions characterizes the holobiont as a unique biological entity. He contends that under environmental stress, the microbiome can change more rapidly and in response to more processes than the host organism alone and thus influences the evolution of the holobiont. Prebiotics, probiotics, synbiotics and phage therapy are conceived as applied aspects of the hologenome concept.

== Awards ==
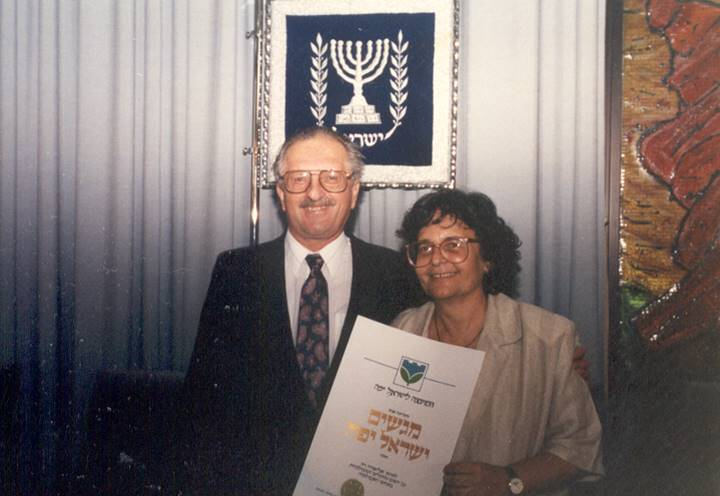
Eugene Rosenberg and Eliora Ron receiving the Prize for a "Beautiful Israel" at the President's residence

In 1983-1984 Rosenberg was appointed as a Fellow of the Guggenheim Foundation. In 1992 he was awarded with the Pan Lab Prize of the Society of Industrial Microbiology and in 1993 he was awarded as a Fogarty International scholar at the National Institute Of Health (NIH). Jointly with Prof.Eliora Ron he received the Israel Prize for a Beautiful Israel in 1995. In 2002 he was awarded the Sakov Prize for ecological research and in 2003, the Procter & Gamble Prize of the American Society for Microbiology (ASM) and together with Yossi Loya, the Landau Prize by Mifaal Hapais in Life Sciences. In 2018 (with Ilana Zilber-Rosenberg), he received the Karl August Möbius Prize for lifetime achievements in symbiosis.

Rosenberg has supervised numerous graduate students and postdocs. He is a Fellow of the American Academy of Microbiology. He is also a Founding Member of the European Society of Microbiology. He is the author of approximately 287 research papers and reviews, 15 books, and 16 patents.

== Selected publications ==
Books

1. Rosenberg, E. and Zilber-Rosenberg, I. (2024). "Where do We Come From? The Origin and Evolution of Life". Austin Macauley Publishers, London. ISBN 978-1035856640
2. Rosenberg, E. (2021). Microbiomes: Current Knowledge and Unanswered Questions. Springer, Cham. ISBN 978-3-030-65316-3
3. Rosenberg, E. (2017). It's in Your DNA. Elsevier Publishers, Oxford, UK. ISBN 978-0128125021
4. Rosenberg, E, Zilber-Rosenberg, I. (2014). The Hologenome Concept: Human, Animal and Plant Microbiota. Springer. ISBN 978-3-319-04241-1
5. Rosenberg, E., E.F. DeLong, S. Lory, E. Stackebrandt, F. Thompson, eds. (2013). The Prokaryotes. ISBN 978-3-642-30140-7
6. Rosenberg, E. and U. Gophna, eds. (2011). Beneficial Microorganisms in Multicellular Life Forms Springer, Heidelberg. ISBN 978-3-642-21680-0
7. Rosenberg, E. and Y. Loya, eds. (2004). Coral Health and Disease Berlin Springer. ISBN 3540207724
8. Rosenberg, E., ed. (1998). Microbial Ecology and Infectious Disease Washington, DC: ASM Press American Society for Microbiology. ISBN 1555811485
9. Rosenberg, E., ed. (1993). Microorganisms to Combat Pollution Springer. ISBN 978-94-010-4730-2
10. Rosenberg, E., ed. (1984).Myxobacteria:Development and cell interactions Springer. ISBN 978-1-4613-8280-5.
11. Rosenberg, E. and I. R. Cohen, eds. (1983). Microbial Biology Philadelphia: Saunders College. ISBN 9780030856587
12. Rosenberg, E. (1971). Cell and Molecular Biology: An Appreciation Holt, Rinehart and Winston, Inc., New York. ISBN 978-0030853128

Articles and Reviews

- Rosenberg, E. (2024). "Diversity of bacteria within the human gut and its contribution to the functional unity of holobionts". npj Biofilms and Microbiomes. 10 (1) 134. doi:10.1038/s41522-024-00580-y. PMC 11585559. PMID 39580487.
- Rosenberg, E.; Zilber-Rosenberg, I. (2022). "Reconstitution and transmission of gut microbiomes and their genes between generations". Microorganisms. 10 (1): 70. doi:10.3390/microorganisms10010070. PMC 8780831. PMID 35056519.
- Zilber-Rosenberg, I.; Rosenberg, E. (2021). "Microbial-driven genetic variation in holobionts". FEMS Microbiology Reviews. 45 (6). doi:10.1093/femsre/fuab022. PMID 33930136.
- Rosenberg, E.; Zilber-Rosenberg, I. (2020). "The hologenome concept of evolution: do mothers matter most?". BJOG: An International Journal of Obstetrics & Gynaecology. 127 (2): 129–137. doi:10.1111/1471-0528.15882. PMID 31325209.
- Ron, E.Z.; Rosenberg, E. (2014). "Enhanced bioremediation of oil spills in the sea". Current Opinion in Biotechnology. 27: 191–194. doi:10.1016/j.copbio.2014.02.004.
- Mills, E.; Shechtman, K.; Loya, Y.; Rosenberg, E. (2013). "Bacteria appear to play important roles both causing and preventing the bleaching of the coral Oculina patagonica". Marine Ecology Progress Series. 489: 155–162. Bibcode:2013MEPS..489..155M. doi:10.3354/meps10391.
- Atad, I.; Zvuloni, A.; Loya, Y.; Rosenberg, E. (2012). "Phage therapy of the white plague-like disease of Favia favus in the Red Sea". Coral Reefs. 31 (3): 665–670. Bibcode:2012CorRe..31..665A. doi:10.1007/s00338-012-0900-5. S2CID 17859169.
- Rosenberg, E.; Zilber-Rosenberg, I. (2011). "Symbiosis and development: the hologenome concept". Birth Defects Research Part C: Embryo Today: Reviews. 93 (1): 56–66. doi:10.1002/bdrc.20196. PMID 21425442.
- Sharon, G.; Segal, D.; Ringo, J.M.; Zilber-Rosenberg, I.; Rosenberg, E (2010). "Commensal bacteria play a role in mating preference of Drosophila melanogaster". Proc. Natl. Acad. Sci. U.S.A. 107 (46): 20051–20056. doi:10.1073/pnas.1009906107. PMC 2993361. PMID 21041648.
- Rosenberg, E.; Kushmaro, A.; Kramarsky-Winter, E.; Banin, E.; Loya, Y. (2009). "The role of microorganisms in coral bleaching". The ISME Journal. 3 (2): 139–146. Bibcode:2009ISMEJ...3..139R. doi:10.1038/ismej.2008.104. PMID 19005495.
- Knezevich, V.; Koren, O.; Ron, E.Z.; Rosenberg, E. (2006). "Petroleum bioremediation in seawater using guano as the fertilizer". Bioremediation Journal. 10 (3): 83–91. Bibcode:2006BiorJ..10...83K. doi:10.1080/10889860600939492. S2CID 59519450.
- Reshef, L.; Koren, O.; Loya, Y.; Zilber-Rosenberg, I.; Rosenberg, E. (2006). "The coral probiotic hypothesis". Environ. Microbiol. 8 (12): 2067–2073. Bibcode:2006EnvMi...8.2068R. doi:10.1111/j.1462-2920.2006.01148.x. PMID 17107548.
- Rosenberg, E.; Falkovitz, L. (2004). "The Vibrio shiloi / Oculina patagonica model system of coral bleaching". Annu. Rev. Microbiol. 58: 143–159. doi:10.1146/annurev.micro.58.030603.123610. PMID 15487933.
- Toren, A.; Orr, E.; Paitan, Y.; Ron, E.Z.; Rosenberg, E. (2002). "The active component of the bioemulsifier alasan from Acinetobacter radioresistens KA53 is an OmpA-like protein". J. Bacteriol. 184 (1): 165–170. doi:10.1128/jb.184.1.165-170.2002. PMC 134766. PMID 11741856.
- Banin, E.; Khare, S. K.; Naider, F.; Rosenberg, E. (2001). "A proline-rich peptide from the coral pathogen Vibrio shiloi that inhibits photosynthesis of zooxanthellae". Appl. Environ. Microbiol. 67 (4): 1536–1541. Bibcode:2001ApEnM..67.1536B. doi:10.1128/aem.67.4.1536-1541.2001. PMC 92766. PMID 11282602.
- Kushmaro, A.; Loya, Y.; Fine, M.; Rosenberg, E. (1996). "Bacterial infection causes bleaching of the coral Oculina patagonica". Nature. 380 (6573): 396. doi:10.1038/380396a0. S2CID 31033320.
- Rosenberg, E. (1993). Microbial diversity as a source of useful biopolymers. (Pan Award) J. Ind. Microbiol. 11: 131–137.
- Rosenberg, E., J.M. Porter, P.D. Nathan, A. Major and M. Varon (1984). Antibiotic TA: An adherent antibiotic. Bio/Technology 2:796-799.
- Rosenberg, M., D.L. Gutnick and E. Rosenberg (1980). Adherence to hydrocarbons: A simple method for measuring cell-surface hydrophobicity. FEMS Microbiol. Lett. 9:29-33 Citation Classic. April 22, 1992.
- Rosenberg, E.; Zuckerberg, A.; Rubinowitz, C.; Gutnick, D.L. (1979). "Emulsifier of Arthrobacter RAG-1: Isolation and emulsifying properties". Appl. Environ. Microbiol. 37 (3): 402–408. Bibcode:1979ApEnM..37..402R. doi:10.1128/AEM.37.3.402-408.1979. PMC 243229. PMID 36840.
- Gutnick, D.L.; Rosenberg, E. (1977). "Oil tankers and pollution: A microbiological approach". Annu. Rev. Microbiol. 31: 379–396. doi:10.1146/annurev.mi.31.100177.002115. PMID 334042.
- Rosenberg, E.; Keller, K.H.; Dworkin, M. (1977). "Cell density dependent growth of Myxococcus xanthus on casein". J. Bacteriol. 129 (2): 770–777. doi:10.1128/JB.129.2.770-777.1977. PMC 235010. PMID 402357.
- Zusman, D.; Rosenberg, E. (1970). "DNA cycles of Myxococcus xanthus". J. Mol. Biol. 49 (3): 609–619. doi:10.1016/0022-2836(70)90285-8. PMID 5453346.
- Rosenberg, E.; Zamenhof, S. (1961). "Further studies on polyribophosphate". J. Biol. Chem. 236 (11): 2845–2850. doi:10.1016/S0021-9258(19)76388-1. PMID 14493951.
