= International Journal of Food Microbiology =

- Discipline: Microbiology
- Language: English
- Edited by: L. Cocolin

Publication details
- History: 1984–present
- Publisher: Elsevier on behalf of the International Union of Microbiological Societies Committee on Food Microbiology and Hygiene
- Frequency: Biweekly
- Impact factor: 5 (2023)

Standard abbreviations
- ISO 4: Int. J. Food Microbiol.

Indexing
- CODEN: IJFMDD
- ISSN: 0168-1605
- OCLC no.: 38995670

Links
- Journal homepage; Online access

The International Journal of Food Microbiology is a peer-reviewed scientific journal publishing research papers, short communications, review articles, and book reviews in area of food microbiology and relates fields of mycology, bacteriology, virology, parasitology, and immunology. It is currently published by Elsevier on behalf of the International Union of Microbiological Societies and Committee on Food Microbiology and Hygiene, and edited by L. Cocolin (Università di Torino).

== Abstracting and indexing ==
The journal is abstracted and indexed in:

- AGRICOLA
- BIOSIS Previews
- CAB Abstracts
- Cambridge Scientific Abstracts
- Current Contents/Agriculture, Biology & Environmental Sciences
- EMBASE
- EMBiology
- Food Science and Technology Abstracts
- MEDLINE
- Science Citation Index
- Scopus

According to the Journal Citation Reports, the journal has a 2023 impact factor of 5.
