= Marcus Thomas Pius Gilbert =

English evolutionary biologist (born 1977)

M Thomas P Gilbert
- Born: 1977 (age 48–49); Hammersmith, London, UK
- Citizenship: United Kingdom, Denmark
- Education: Oriel College and New College, Oxford University
- Known for: ancient DNA/Paleogenomics, Phylogenomics, Evolutionary Hologenomics
- Scientific career
- Fields: Evolutionary biology, Hologenomics, Paleogenomics
- Workplaces: The GLOBE Institute, NTNU University Museum, Natural History Museum of Denmark, University of Copenhagen, University of Arizona, Oxford University
- Doctoral advisor: Alan Cooper

Marcus Thomas Pius Gilbert (also known as Tom Gilbert, and publishing as M Thomas P Gilbert) is an evolutionary biologist. His work is highly cited, and influential in the fields of palaeogenomics, evolutionary genomics and evolutionary hologenomics. He is currently the director of the University of Copenhagen's Center for Evolutionary Hologenomics.

He received a Bachelor of Arts in Biological Sciences at Oriel College, Oxford University in 2000, and Doctor of Philosophy from the Zoology Dept and at New College, Oxford University in 2004 under Alan Cooper. Subsequently, he was a post-doctoral fellow with Michael Worobey at the Department of Ecology and Evolutionary Biology, at the University of Arizona, where he undertook genetic analyses on samples containing some of the earliest recorded HIV-1 infected tissues. In 2005, he became an assistant professor at the University of Copenhagen, where he has been professor of palaeogenomics since 2011, initially at the Natural History Museum of Denmark, and subsequently at the GLOBE Institute. In 2020 he founded and became the first director of the Center for Evolutionary Hologenomics. He is also a professor at NTNU University Museum.

As of 2022, Gilbert is an associate editor of the journals Evolution, Medicine and Public Health, and Methods in Ecology and Evolution, and a former editor of the journals PLOS One, Environmental DNA, Open Quaternary and Archaeological and Anthropological Sciences. He is a member of the editorial board for Current Biology. and an elected member of the Royal Danish Academy of Sciences and Letters.

As of January 2022 he was the author of ca. 390 papers in peer-reviewed journals.
