= Hologenomics =

Hologenomics is the omics study of hologenomes. A hologenome is the whole set of genomes of a holobiont, an organism together with all co-habitating microbes, other life forms, and viruses. While the term hologenome originated from the hologenome theory of evolution, which postulates that natural selection occurs on the holobiont level, hologenomics uses an integrative framework to investigate interactions between the host and its associated species. Examples include gut microbe or viral genomes linked to human or animal genomes for host-microbe interaction research. Hologenomics approaches have also been used to explain genetic diversity in the microbial communities of marine sponges.

== History ==
The origins of hologenomics revolves around the hologenome theory of evolution, which describes individual multicellular organisms, microbes, and viruses establishing symbiotic relationships and undergoing coevolution together. Richard Jefferson introduced the term 'hologenome' to describe the host-symbiont genome as an evolutionary unit. Prior to this, Lynn Margulis used the term 'holobiont' to describe hosts and their associated species as an ecological unit.

== Eukaryotes-prokaryotes coevolution ==
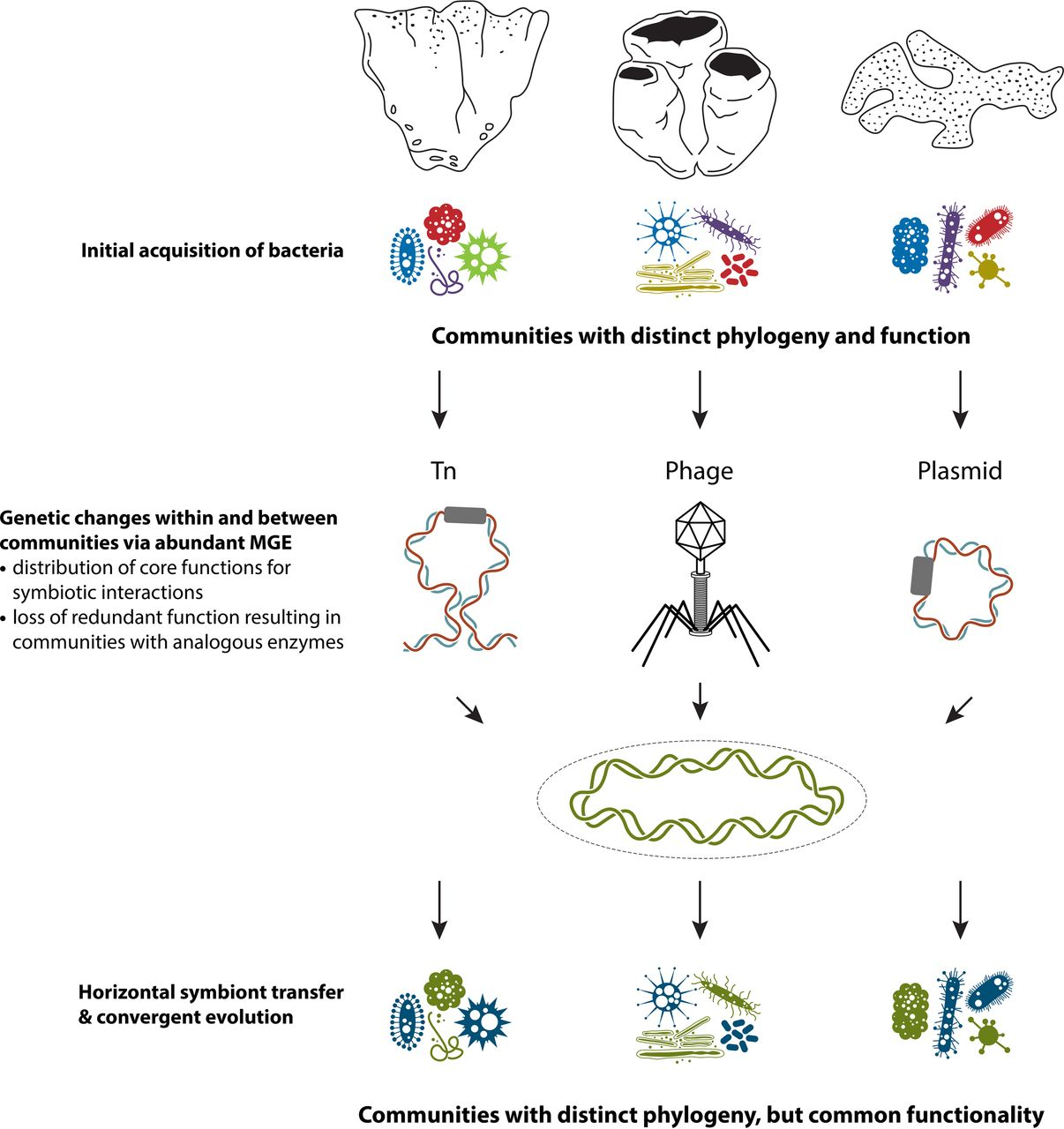
Distinct microbial communities in sponges converge to have common functionality despite retaining phylogenetic differences.

Earliest evidence of multicellular-unicellular interactions are seen in sponges, which are a well studied hologenomic system. Porifera are often described as holobionts because they harbor a wide range of bacteria, archaea and algae. Microbial communities present have been observed in facilitating metabolic functions and immune responses. Offspring inherit these microbial colonies via vertical and/or horizontal transmission. Symbiont colonies are transferred through parental gametes in vertical transmission, whereas offspring acquire same colonies from their environment in horizontal transmission. Vertical transmission is also seen in terrestrial organisms like C. ocellatus, where gammaproteobacteria in the parental gut is vertically transferred through egg contamination.

== Criticism ==
The hologenome theory evolution is not fully accepted, and research in microbial-host phylogenetics is ongoing. Rather than the selection of corals with certain symbiotic microbial communities, coral bleaching may simply be a result of environmental stressors, and bacterial presence in bleached coral may be explained simply as opportunistic colonization. Ubiquity testing also revealed many different bacterial and algal symbionts that are not associated with a single species of coral, suggesting that hologenomics just identifies and validates mechanistic interactions between pathogens, microbes, and their hosts.

== Examples of discoveries with hologenomic approaches ==
- Nanopore sequencing - Profiling organelle genomes in the holobiont C. ashmeadii revealed that Rhodospirillaceae was dominant among six putative endosymbionts.
- 16S rRNA sequencing - Sponge-specific microbial communities were profiled with rRNA and rRNA gene sequencing, providing insight into bacterial diversity and activity of those communities.
- Metagenomic DNA - Gene profiles of sponge microbiomes were compared to surrounding planktonic communities. Core function genes of microbial symbionts expressed consistent patterns of phylogeny and function that differ from planktonic samples, demonstrating host-symbiont co-evolution.

== Applications ==
=== Medicine ===
It's hypothesized the continued incidence non-infectious diseases is a result of modernization reducing the diversity of symbiotic microbes. The human microbiome has also been correlated to numerous etiologies of non-communicable disease, such as brain disorders, cancer, and heart disease. Interactions between human microbiome and human health are complex and suggest a hologenomic approach.

Disease biomarkers can be found by investigating lifestyle, genomic differences, and mRNA/protein/metabolite profiles of the patient and their microbiota. For investigating microbiomes and specifically microbiota subcommunities that may contribute to a disease phenotype, longitudinal studies are recommended as everyone has a personalized microbiome with small differences in microbiome phylotypes. A personalized plan managing a person's microbiome can then be developed, with prebiotics nurturing beneficial endogenous microbes, and probiotics manipulating a person's hologenome.

=== Immunology ===
Conditional mutualism, where parasites have mutualistic effects under certain environmental/ecological conditions, have been found with holobiont-holobiont interactions. Maturation of mammalian host immune systems has been known to involve gastrointestinal flora. Understanding microorganism recognition of foreign pathogenic invasion and how host immunity favors the most ideal symbiont may aid in discovering novel therapeutic treatments to combat evolving diseases.

== See also ==
- Pangenome
- Superorganism
