= International Union of Microbiological Societies =

Scientific supraorganization

- Abbreviation: IUMS
- Formation: 1927; 99 years ago
- Type: INGO
- Region served: Worldwide
- Official language: English
- President: (Israel) Eliora Z. Ron
- Parent organization: International Science Council
- Website: www.iums.org

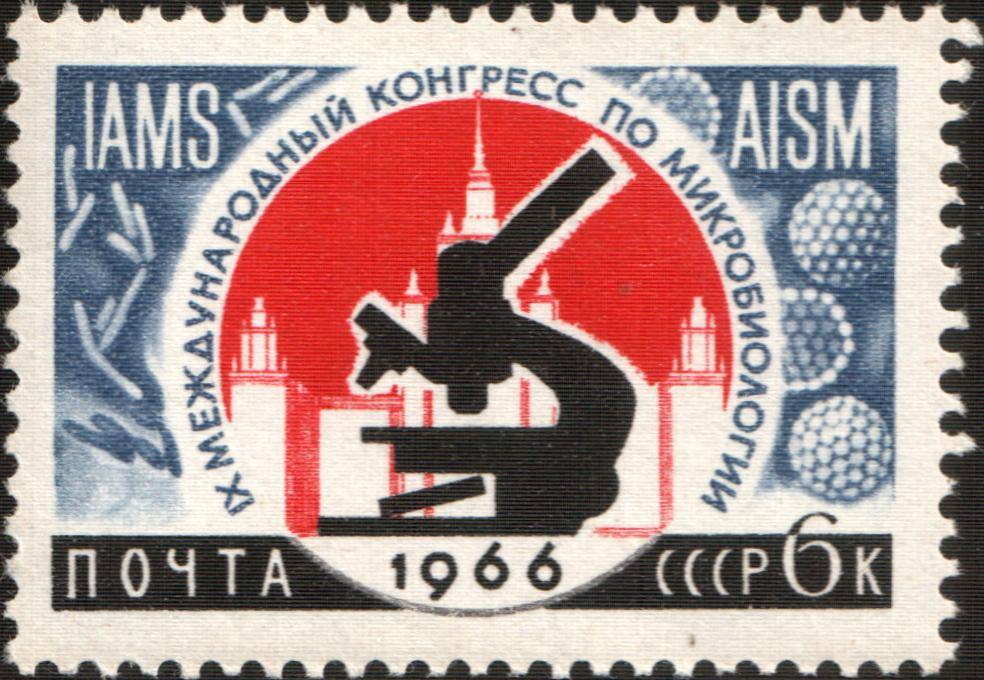
IX Microbiology International Congress (24-30.07.1966, Moscow). 1966 postal stamp of the USSR

The International Union of Microbiological Societies (IUMS), founded in 1927 as the International Society of Microbiology, is one of 40 member unions and associations of the International Science Council (ISC), and was formerly under ISC's predecessor, the International Council for Science.

The union's objectives are to promote the study of microbiological sciences internationally: initiate, facilitate and coordinate research and other scientific activities which involve international cooperation; ensure the discussion and dissemination of the results of international conferences, symposia and meetings and assist in the publication of their reports; represent microbiological sciences in ISC and maintain contact with other international organizations.

IUMS activities include the classification and nomenclature of bacteria, fungi and viruses, food microbiology, medical microbiology and diagnostics, culture collections, education, and biological standardization.

The president-elect of IUMS is Professor Eliora Ron of Tel Aviv University.

== Organization ==
The IUMS has three divisions:

- Bacteriology and Applied Microbiology (BAM)
- Mycology
- Virology

These divisions each have their own set of officers and objectives. Each division is responsible for the organization of their own International Congresses. They work together toward the goal of furthering microbiology research and communication globally. The IUMS conducts scientific activities through 6 specialist international committees, 9 international commissions, and 2 international federations. Some of these "comcofs" are managed under a division, others through the IUMS directly. The IUMS acts as the umbrella organization for:

- ICFMH - International Committee on Food Microbiology & Hygiene
- ICSP - International Committee on Systematics of Prokaryotes
- ICMSF - International Commission of Microbiological Specifications for Food
- ICTF - International Commission on Taxonomy of Fungi
- ICY - International Commission on Yeasts
- ICFM - International Commission on Food Mycology
- ICIF - International Commission on Indoor Fungi
- ICPA - International Commission on Penicillium & Aspergillus
- ICTV - International Committee on Taxonomy of Viruses
- WFCC - World Federation for Culture Collections
- ICB - The International Committee on Bionomenclature
- IABS - International Association of Biologicals
- IUMS Public Policy Committee
