= Eliora Z. Ron =

Israeli microbiologist

Eliora Zenziper Ron
- אליאורה צנציפר רון
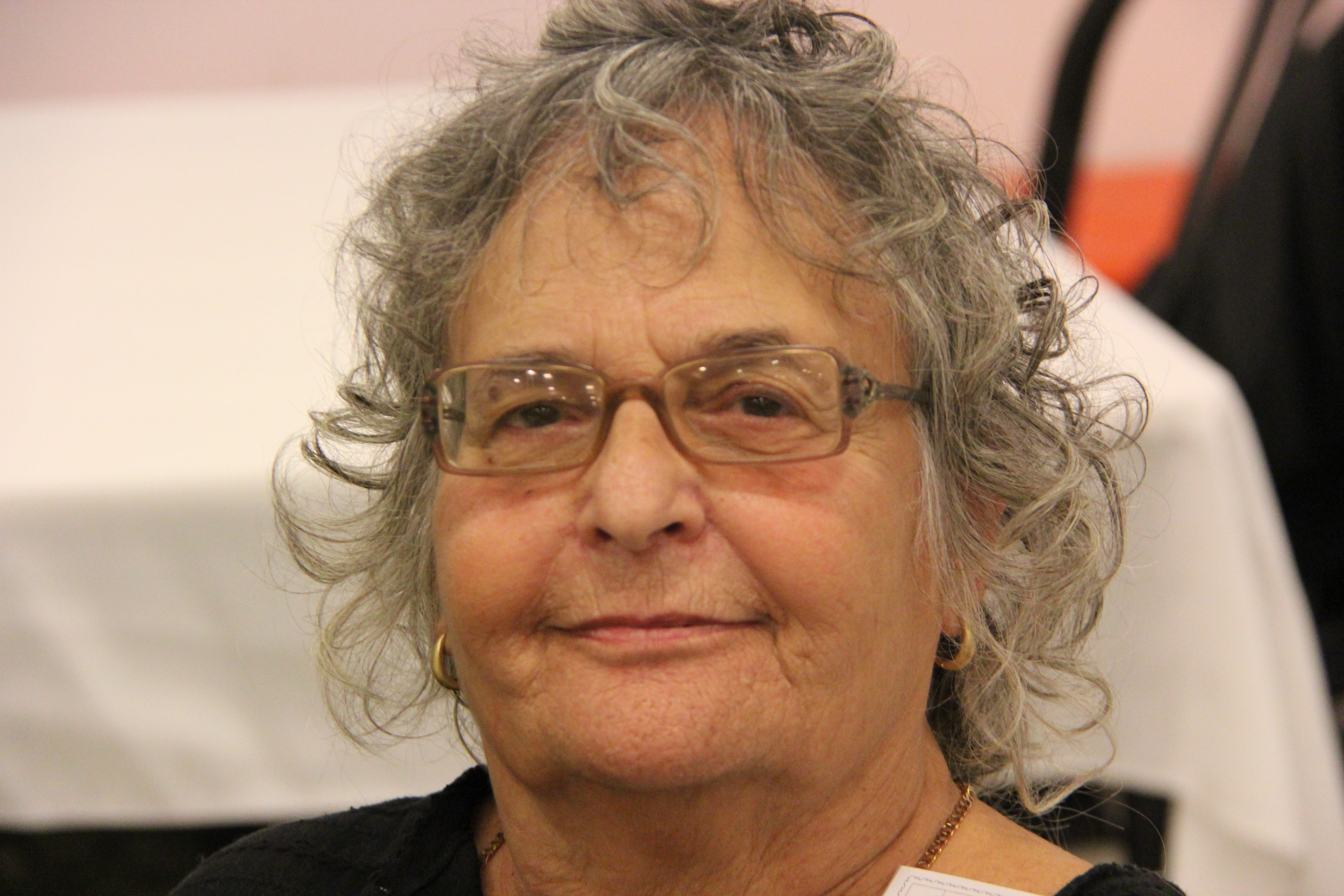
- Eliora Ron in 2013
- Education: Hebrew University of Jerusalem, Harvard University
- Known for: Secretary General of the European Academy of Microbiology, President of the International Union of Microbiology Societies
- Awards: EMET Prize (2007)
- Scientific career
- Fields: Microbiology
- Workplaces: Tel Aviv University, MIGAL Galilee Research Institute
- Thesis: Studies on the regulation of RNA synthesis in Escherichia coli (1967)
- Doctoral advisor: Bernard D. Davis

Eliora Zenziper Ron (Hebrew: אליאורה צנציפר רון) is an Israeli microbiologist who is the Secretary General of the European Academy of Microbiology and President of the International Union of Microbiology Societies.

== Life and career ==
Ron received her MSc in microbiology, Genetics and Biochemistry in 1962 from the Hebrew University in Jerusalem, before moving to the US to do her PhD at Harvard University under the supervision of Professor Bernard D Davies in 1967. Her PhD thesis was entitled ‘Studies on the regulation of RNA synthesis in Escherichia coli’.

She was then offered a faculty member position at Tel Aviv University, where her lab is based to this day, becoming a full professor in 1984. In 1995, she became the president of the Israeli Society of Microbiology, a capacity in which she served until 1999. In 2000 she became Dean of the Faculty of Life Sciences at Tel Aviv University and in 2002 she was elected as a fellow of the American Academy of Microbiology. The same year, she became Vice President of the Federation of Israeli Societies of Experimental Biology (FISEB). She remained Dean until 2004. Between 2004 and 2007 she was the President of the Federation of Microbiology Societies and in 2005 she became President of the FISEB. In 2007 she was awarded the EMET prize for Excellence in Arts, Science, and Culture, Israel.

In 2009, she was a founding member of the European Academy of Microbiology, and she has served in the role of Secretary General since this point. In 2010, she became the scientific director of the MIGAL Galilee Research Institute, and also received an honorary doctorate from Ben Gurion University, Israel. In 2011 she became the president of the Bacteriology and Applied Microbiology section of the International Union of Microbiology Societies (IUMS), and later, in 2017, became the president of the IUMS.

She has three children named Michal, Itai and Anat.
