= Holobiont =

Host and associated species living as a discrete ecological unit

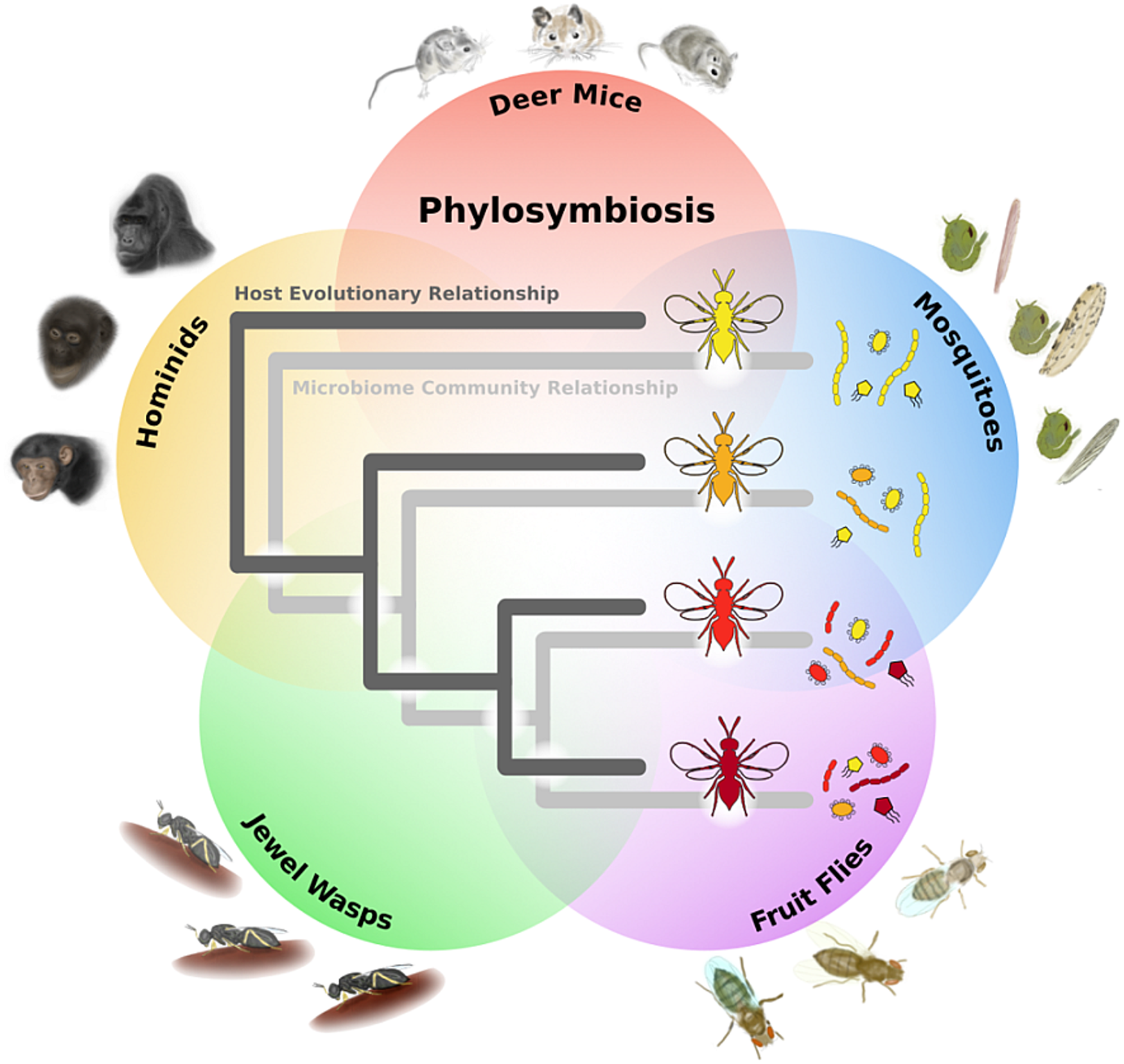
Microbiome relationships mirror host evolution. The more distantly related species are, the more distinct the composition of their cognate microbiomes, as reflected in the overlaid phylogeny of wasps and their microbiota.

A holobiont is an assemblage of a host and the many other species living in or around it, which together form a discrete ecological unit through symbiosis, though there is controversy over its discreteness. The components of a holobiont are individual species or bionts, while the combined genome of all bionts is the hologenome. The holobiont concept was initially introduced by the German theoretical biologist Adolf Meyer-Abich in 1943, and then apparently independently by Dr. Lynn Margulis in her 1991 book Symbiosis as a Source of Evolutionary Innovation. The concept has evolved since the original formulations. Holobionts include the host, virome, microbiome, and any other organisms which contribute in some way to the functioning of the whole. Well-studied holobionts include reef-building corals and humans.

== Overview ==
A holobiont is a collection of closely associated species that have complex interactions, such as a plant species and the members of its microbiome. Each species present in a holobiont is a biont, and the genomes of all bionts taken together are the hologenome, or the "comprehensive gene system" of the holobiont. A holobiont typically includes a eukaryote host and all of the symbiotic viruses, bacteria, fungi, etc. that live on or inside it.

Holobionts are distinct from superorganisms; superorganisms consist of many individuals, sometimes of the same species, and the term is commonly applied to eusocial insects. An ant colony can be described as a superorganism, whereas an individual ant and its associated bacteria, fungi, etc. are a holobiont. There is no doubt that symbiotic microorganisms are pivotal for the biology and ecology of the host by providing vitamins, energy and inorganic or organic nutrients, participating in defense mechanisms, or by driving the evolution of the host. There is still some controversy surrounding these terms, and they have been used interchangeably in some publications.

== History of the holobiont concept ==
Holism is a philosophical notion first proposed by Aristotle in the 4th century BC. It states that systems should be studied in their entirety, with a focus on the interconnections between their various components rather than on the individual parts. Such systems have emergent properties that result from the behavior of a system that is "larger than the sum of its parts". However, a major shift away from holism occurred during the Age of Enlightenment when the dominant thought summarized as "dissection science" was to focus on the smallest component of a system as a means of understanding it.

The idea of holism started to regain popularity in biology when the endosymbiosis theory was first proposed by Konstantin Mereschkowski in 1905 and further developed by Ivan Wallin in 1925. Still accepted today, this theory posits a single origin for eukaryotic cells through the symbiotic assimilation of prokaryotes to form first mitochondria and later plastids (the latter through several independent symbiotic events) via phagocytosis (reviewed in Archibald, 2015). These ancestral and founding symbiotic events, which prompted the metabolic and cellular complexity of eukaryotic life, most likely occurred in the ocean.

Despite the general acceptance of the endosymbiosis theory, the term holobiosis or holobiont did not immediately enter the scientific vernacular. It was coined independently by the German Adolf Meyer-Abich in 1943, and by Lynn Margulis in 1990, who proposed that evolution has worked mainly through symbiosis-driven leaps that merged organisms into new forms, referred to as "holobionts", and only secondarily through gradual mutational changes. However, the concept was not widely used until it was co-opted by coral biologists over a decade later. Corals and the dinoflagellate algae called Zooxanthellae are one of the most iconic examples of symbioses found in nature; most corals are incapable of long-term survival without the products of photosynthesis provided by their endosymbiotic algae. Rohwer et al. (2002) were the first to use the word holobiont to describe a unit of selection in the sense of Margulis for corals, where the holobiont comprised the cnidarian polyp (host), Zooxanthellae algae, various ectosymbionts (endolithic algae, prokaryotes, fungi, other unicellular eukaryotes), and viruses.

Although initially driven by studies of marine organisms, much of the research on the emerging properties and significance of holobionts has since been carried out in other fields of research: the microbiota of the rhizosphere of plants or the animal gut became predominant models and have led to an ongoing paradigm shift in agronomy and medical sciences. Holobionts occur in terrestrial and aquatic habitats alike, and several analogies between these ecosystems can be made. For example, in all of these habitats, interactions within and across holobionts such as induction of chemical defenses, nutrient acquisition, or biofilm formation are mediated by chemical cues and signals in the environment, dubbed infochemicals. Nevertheless, we can identify two major differences between terrestrial and aquatic systems. First, water allows higher chemical connectivity and signaling between macro- and micro-organisms in aquatic or moist environments. In marine ecosystems, carbon fluxes also appear to be swifter and trophic modes more flexible, leading to higher plasticity of functional interactions across holobionts. Moreover, dispersal barriers are usually lower, allowing for faster microbial community shifts in marine holobionts. Second, phylogenetic diversity at broad taxonomic scales (i.e., supra-kingdom, kingdom and phylum levels), is higher in aquatic realms compared to land, with much of the aquatic diversity yet to be uncovered, especially marine viruses.

== Holobiont components ==
Host: The host member of a holobiont is typically a multicellular eukaryote, such as a plant or human. Notable hosts that are well-studied include humans, corals, and poplar trees.

Microbiome: The microbiome includes bacteria, archaea, microscopic fungi, and microscopic protists.

Virome: All of the viruses included in a holobiont are collectively referred to as the virome

Fungi: Multicellular fungi can be included in holobionts, such as arbuscular mycorrhizal fungi (AMF) in the roots of plants.

== The holobiont phenotype ==
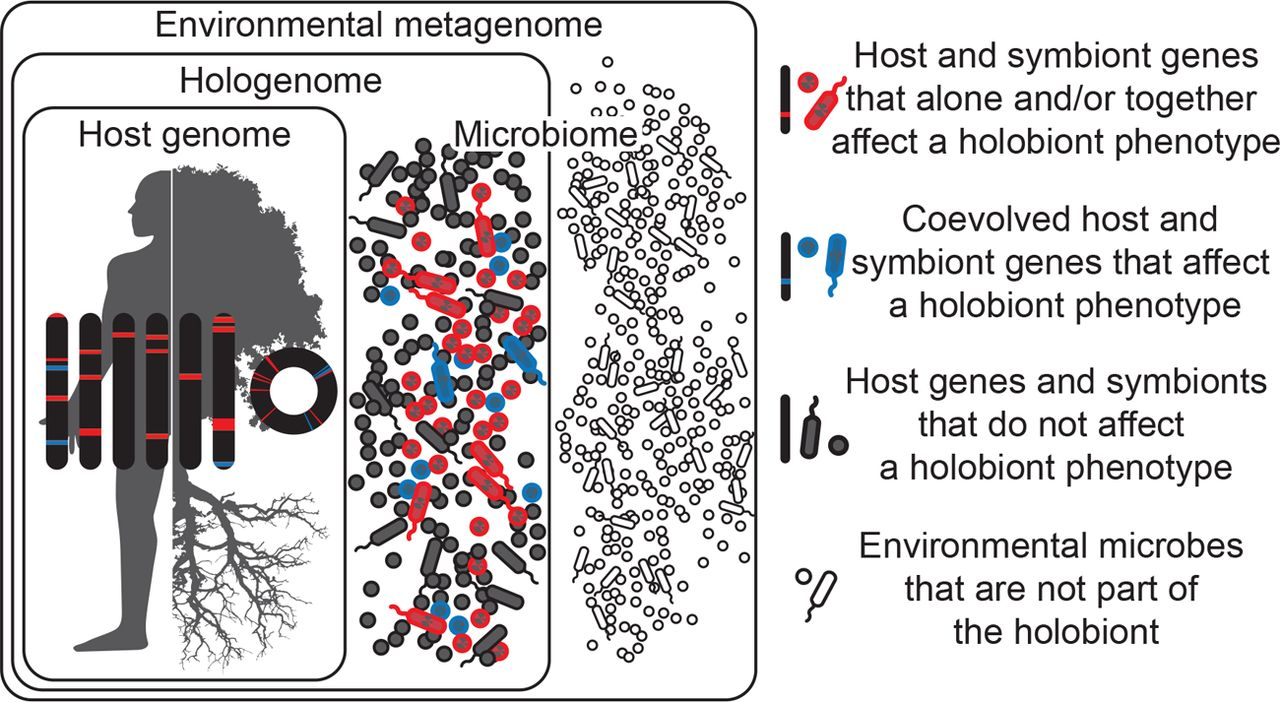
The holobiont phenotype

Holobionts are entities composed of a host and all of its symbiotic microbes.

In the diagram, the symbiotic microbes that affect a holobiont's phenotype and have coevolved with the host are coloured blue, while those which affect the holobiont's phenotype but have not coevolved with the host are coloured red. Those that do not affect the holobiont's phenotype at all are coloured gray. Microbes may be transmitted vertically or horizontally, may be acquired from the environment, and can be constant or inconstant in the host.

It follows that holobiont phenotypes can change in time and space as microbes come into and out of the holobiont. Microbes in the environment are not part of the holobiont (white). Hologenomes then encompass the genomes of the host and all of its microbes at any given time point, with individual genomes and genes falling into the same three functional categories of blue, red, and gray. Holobionts and hologenomes are entities, whereas coevolution or the evolution of host-symbiont interactions are processes.

=== Plants ===
Although most work on host-microbe interactions has been focused on animal systems such as corals, sponges, or humans, there is a substantial body of literature on plant holobionts. Plant-associated microbial communities impact both key components of the fitness of plants, growth and survival, and are shaped by nutrient availability and plant defense mechanisms. Several habitats have been described to harbor plant-associated microbes, including the rhizoplane (surface of root tissue), the rhizosphere (periphery of the roots), the endosphere (inside plant tissue), and the phyllosphere (total above-ground surface area). The holobiont concept originally suggested that a significant fraction of the microbiome genome together with the host genome is transmitted from one generation to the next and thus can propagate unique properties of the holobiont". In this regard, studies have shown that seeds can play such a role. Evidence of this process have been recently proven showing that the majority, up to 95%, of the seed microbiome is mistranslated across generations.

The plant holobiont is relatively well-studied, with particular focus on agricultural species such as legumes and grains. Bacteria, fungi, archaea, protists, and viruses are all members of the plant holobiont.

The bacteria phyla known to be part of the plant holobiont are Actinomycetota, Bacteroidota, Bacillota, and Pseudomonadota. For example, nitrogen-fixers such as Azotobacter (Pseudomonadota) and Bacillus (Bacillota) greatly improve plant performance.

Fungi of the phyla Ascomycota, Basidiomycota, Glomeromycota, and Mucoromycotina colonize plant tissues and provide a variety of functions for the plant host. Arbuscular mycorrhizal fungi (Glomeromycota), for instance, are common across plant groups and provide improved nutrient acquisition, temperature and drought resistance, and reduced pathogen load. Epichloë species (Ascomycota) are part of the meadow fescue holobiont and provide herbivore resistance by producing ergot alkaloids, which cause ergotism in mammals.

Protist members of the plant holobiont are less well-studied, with most knowledge oriented towards pathogens. However, there are examples of commensalistic plant-protist associations, such as Phytomonas (Trypanosomatidae).

=== Marine ===
Reef-building corals are holobionts that include the coral itself (a eukaryotic invertebrate within class Anthozoa), photosynthetic dinoflagellates called zooxanthellae (Symbiodinium), and associated bacteria and viruses. Co-evolutionary patterns exist for coral microbial communities and coral phylogeny.

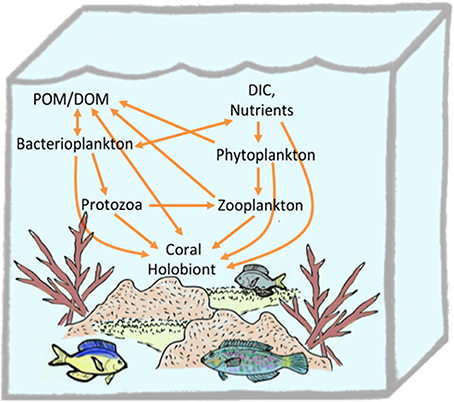
Coral holobiont

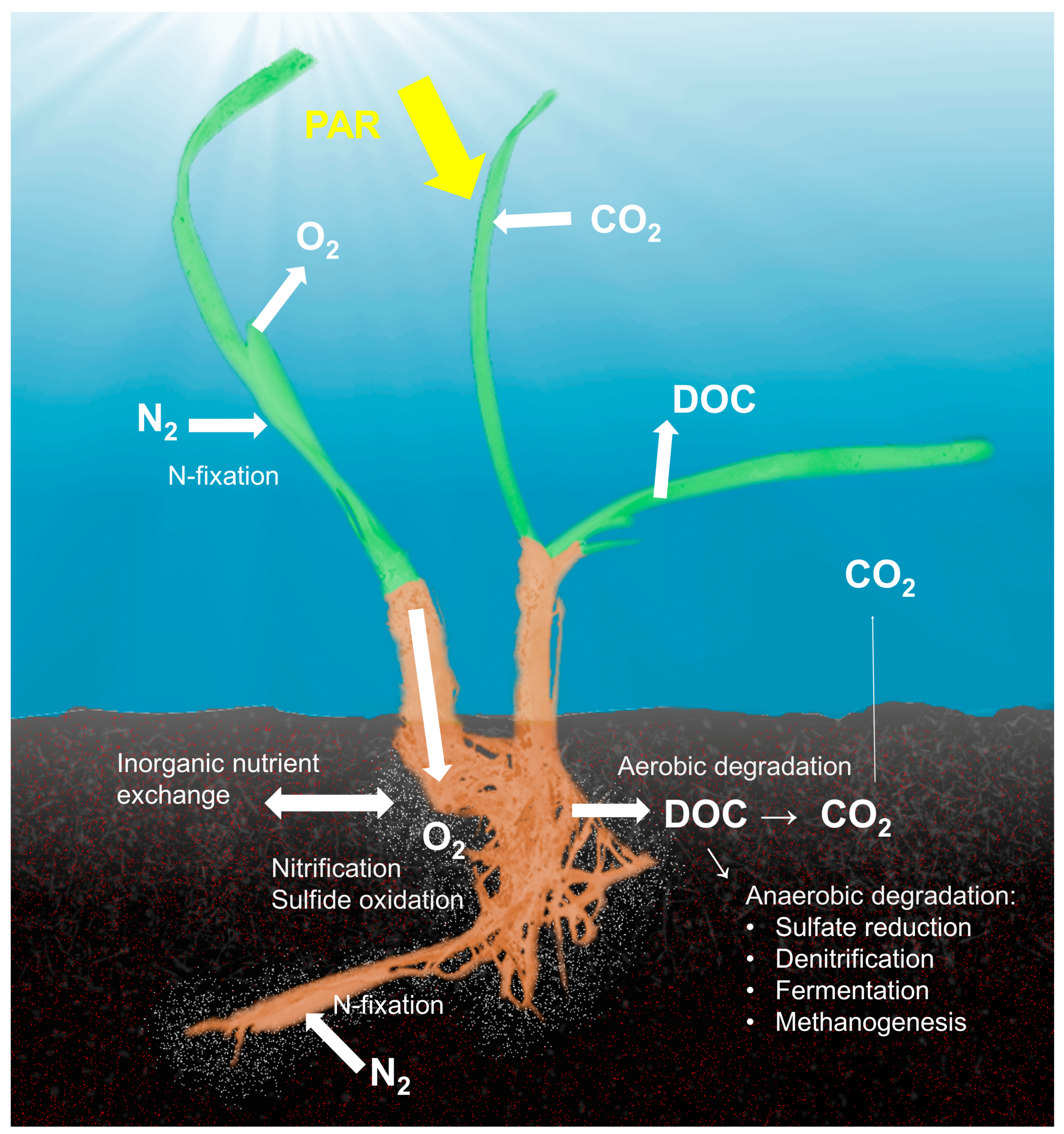
Seagrass holobiont

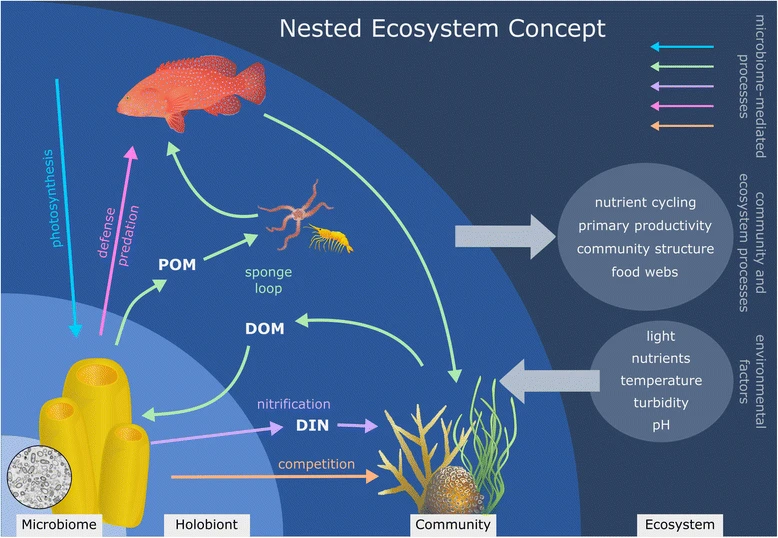
Sponge holobiont

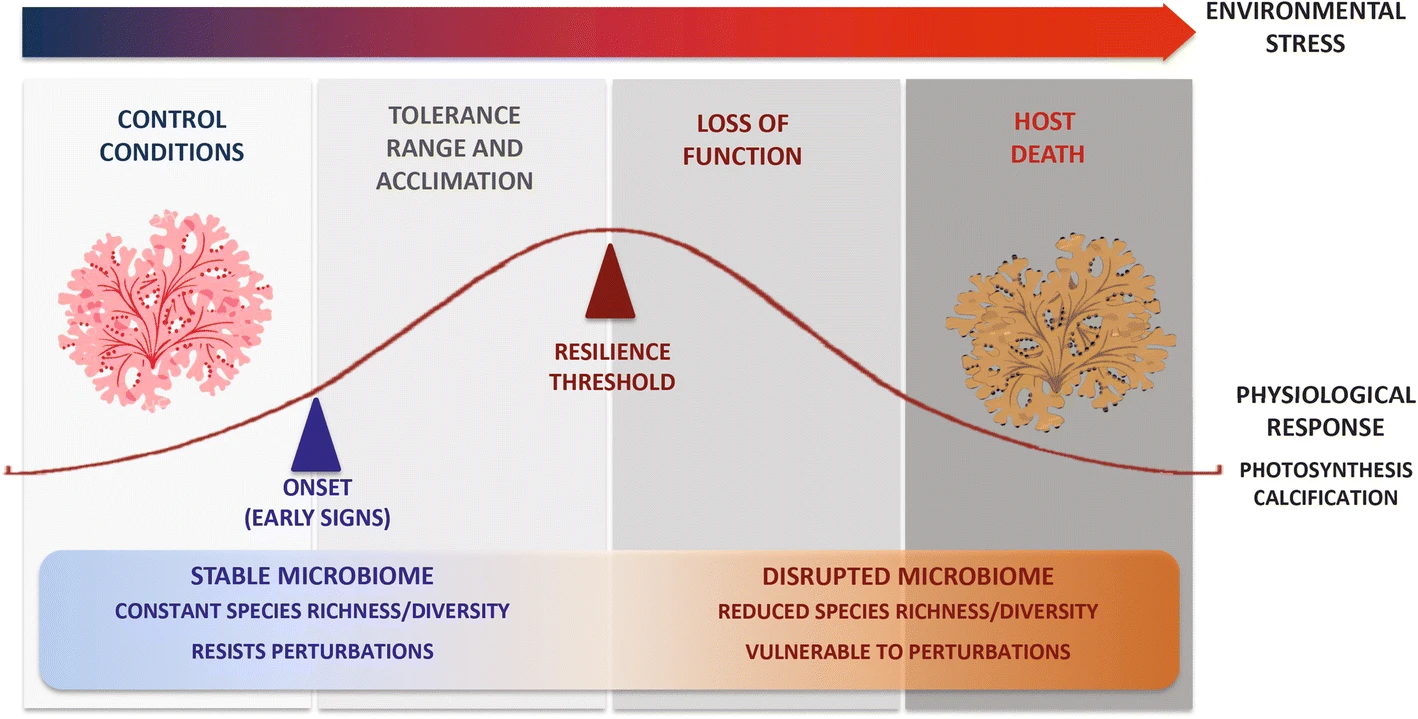
Climate change and the rhodolith holobiont

== Effects of stressors ==
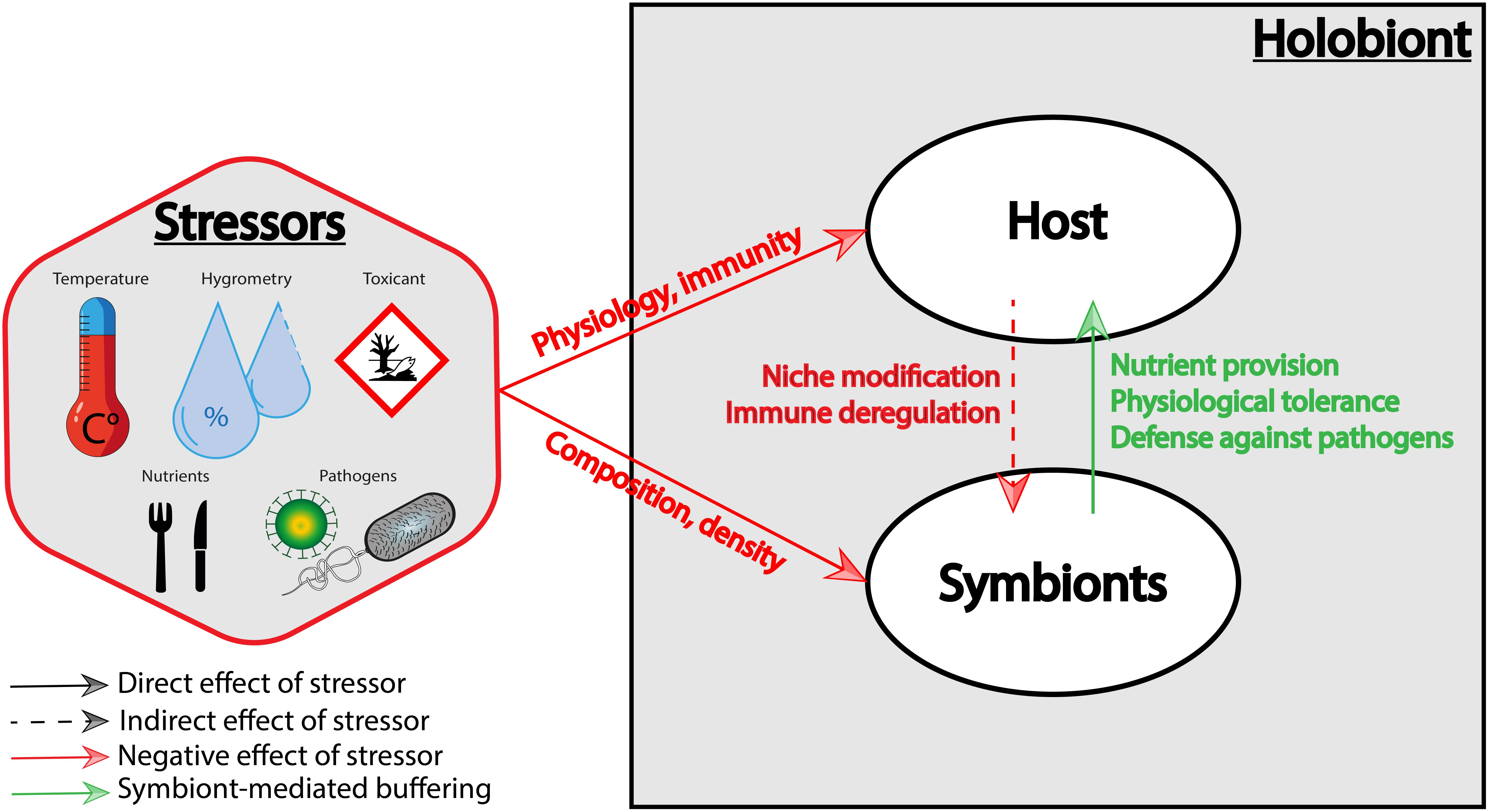
Effects of stressors on the holobiont

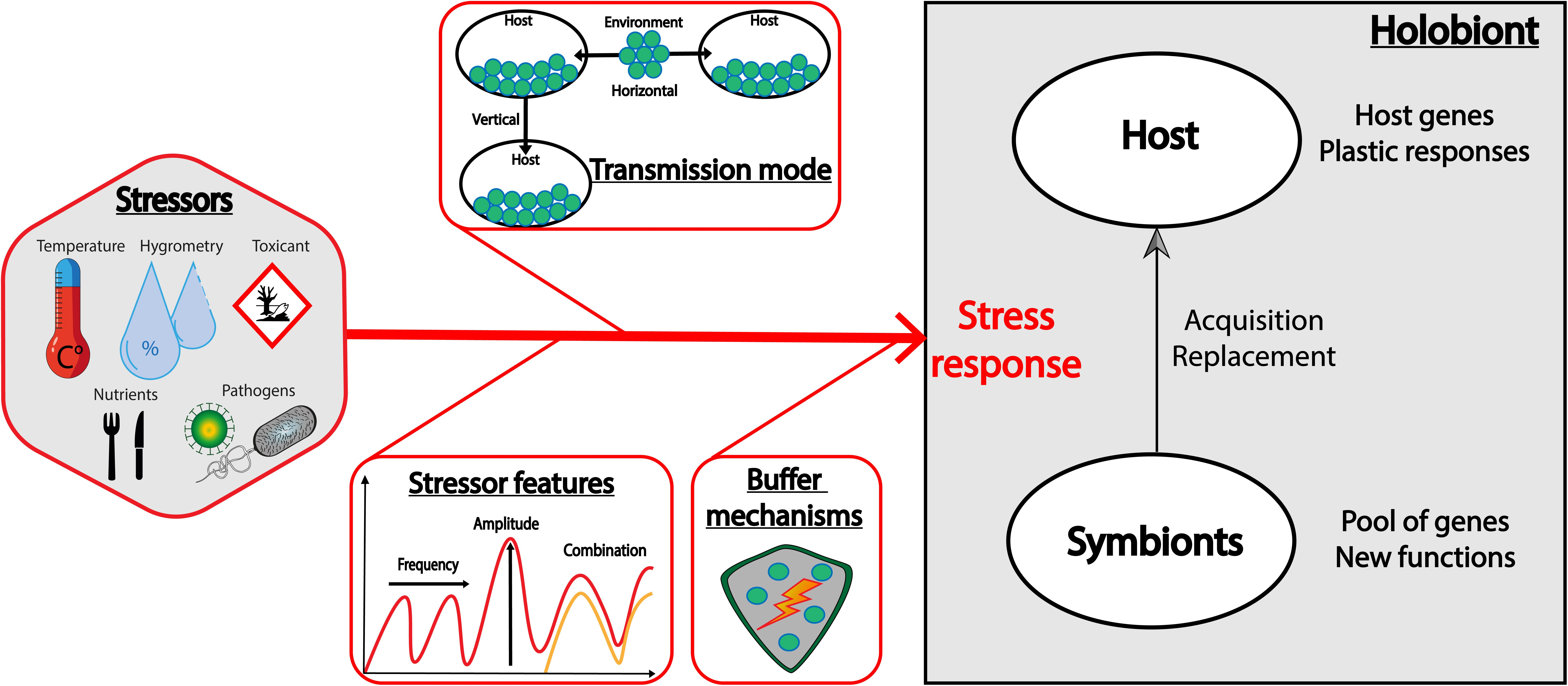
The holobiont response to stressors

Stressors can alter directly the host physiology and immunity, and the symbiotic community composition and density. Stressors may also indirectly affect the symbiotic community by altering the host physiology (which represents the symbiotic niche), and the immune state of the host. Conversely, symbionts can buffer stressors via nutrient provision, physiological tolerance, and defense against host natural enemies.

The holobiont response to stressors is difficult to predict, as many factors can be under selection. This includes host resistance genes and plastic mechanisms, but also acquisition of symbionts that can constitute a pool of genes with new functions. Some key factors that can preferentially select for the host or the symbionts to adapt to stressors are: (1) the features of the stressor, such as its frequency or amplitude, but also its combination with another stressor that can lead to an additive, synergistic or antagonist interaction; (2) the transmission mode of the symbionts; (3) the specificity and the efficiency of the given buffering mechanism, and the net balance between its cost and its benefit.

== Holobiomics ==
Holobiomics is the scientific analysis of a community of holobionts, which focuses on the interconnections between its components in the context of the prevailing environmental conditions rather than on the individual parts. The scientific approach for this emerging research field is based on the concept of holism. Holobiomics aims to study the holobionts of a system, their properties, and their interactions in their entirety.

The term "holobiomics" is composed of Greek elements όλος (hólos), "all, whole, total", and βίος (bíos), "life", ending on -ome (biome); and the suffix -omics (-ομική, feminine), which identifies subfields of modern biology that aim at the characterisation and quantification of the entirety of similar individual elements in order to draw conclusions about the structure, function, and dynamics of a system.

To infer the properties and interactions of the symbiotic partners, techniques in molecular biology, ecology, and modelling are combined.

== Controversy ==
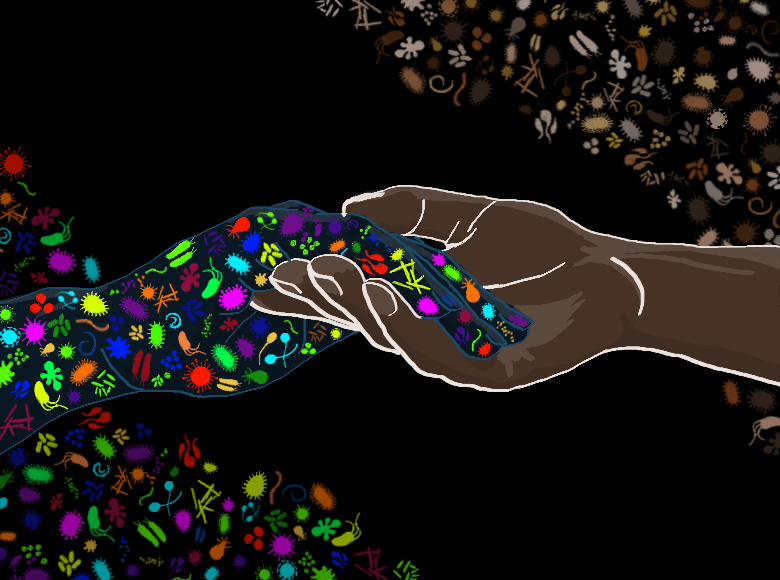
Artist's depiction of a holobiont: a human and their microbiome

Recent years have seen the development of powerful but relatively inexpensive tools for characterising microbial communities, including high throughput sequencing technologies such as whole genome shotgun sequencing. These technological advances have led to an explosion of interest in microbial ecology and in the evolution of microbe-host relationships. Some researchers question whether the holobiont concept is needed, and whether it does justice to the intricacies of host-symbiont relationships. In 2016, Douglas and Werren took issue with the concept that "the holobiont (host plus its microbiome) and its constituent hologenome (the totality of genomes in the holobiont) are a unit of selection, and therefore this unit has properties similar to an individual organism". They argue that "the hologenome concept is unhelpful to the study of host interactions with resident microorganisms because it focuses on one level of selection (the holobiont), and as a result it is concerned with cooperative and integrative features of host-microbe systems to the exclusion of other kinds of interactions, including antagonism among microorganisms and conflicts between host and microbial partners."

The holobiont and by extension the hologenome concept remain controversial, particularly in regard to the host and its microbiome as a single evolutionary unit. In order to validate the holobiont concept from an evolutionary perspective, new theoretical approaches are needed that acknowledge the different levels at which natural selection can operate in the context of microbiome-host interactions. For example, selection could occur at the level of the holobiont when a transgenerational association among specific host and symbiont genotypes can be maintained.

Nevertheless, the holobiont concept has resulted in a shift from the focus on symbioses involving one microbial partner and a single host (squids and luminescent Aliivibrio, legumes and Rhizobium, aphids and Buchnera) toward a greater interest in symbioses in complex multi-partner consortia (animal gut systems, marine invertebrates, plant and seaweed epiphytes, microbe-microbe interactions in soil, aquatic biomes). Moreover, there is a realization that even the relatively well understood binary symbioses such as aphids and Buchnera are more complex with a number of diverse facultative symbionts contributing to resistance to parasites, expanding host plant usage and temperature adaptation.

== See also ==
- Hologenome theory of evolution
- Hologenomics
- Pan-genome
- Phytobiome
- Photosymbiosis
- Superorganism
- Symbiogenesis
