= Plant holobiont =

Since the colonization of land by ancestral plant lineages 450 million years ago, plants and their associated microbes have been interacting with each other, forming an assemblage of species that is often referred to as a holobiont. Selective pressure acting on holobiont components has likely shaped plant-associated microbial communities and selected for host-adapted microorganisms that impact plant fitness. However, the high microbial densities detected on plant tissues, together with the fast generation time of microbes and their more ancient origin compared to their host, suggest that microbe-microbe interactions are also important selective forces sculpting complex microbial assemblages in the phyllosphere, rhizosphere, and plant endosphere compartments.

== Introduction ==
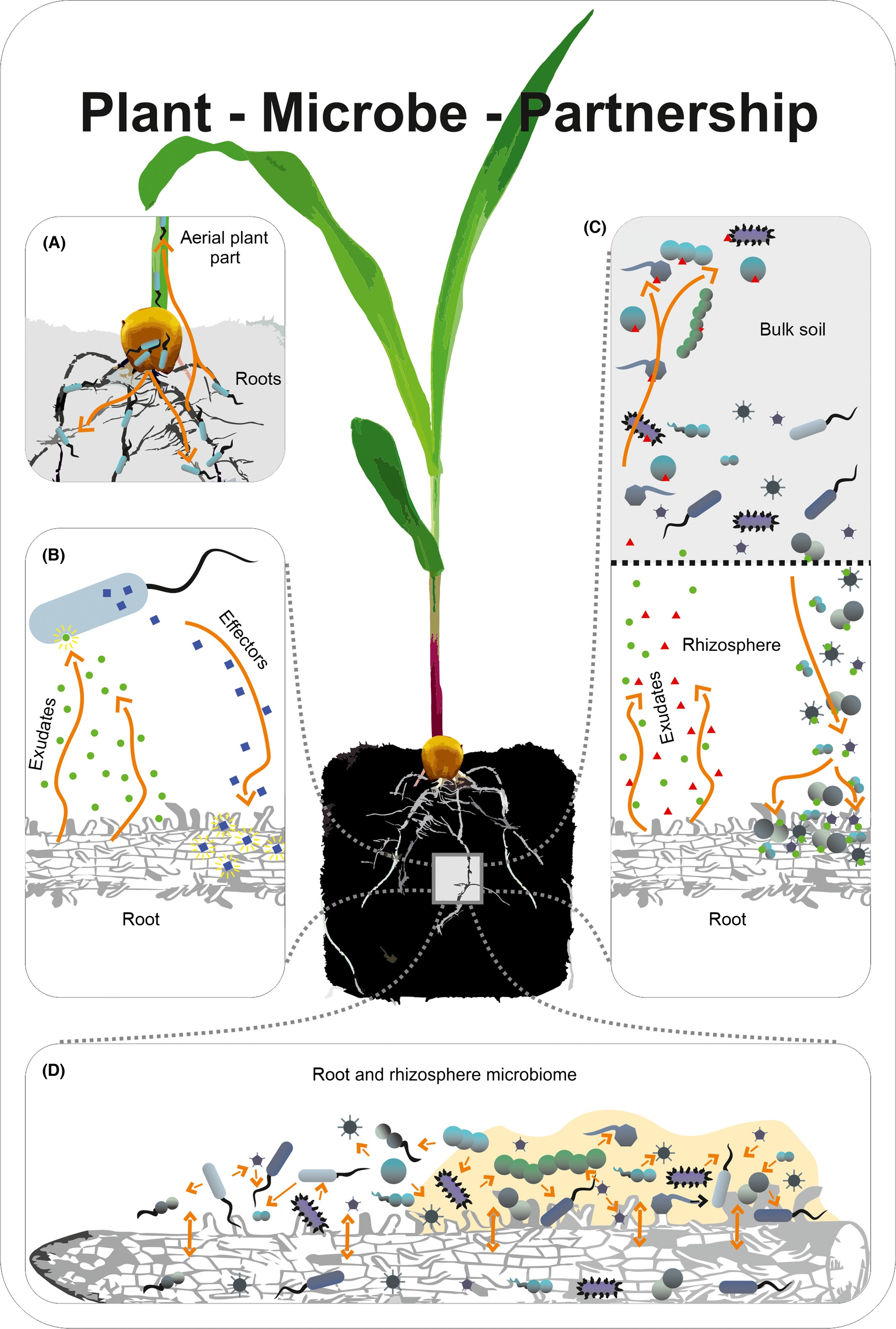
Plant–microbe partnership (A) Plants are colonized initially by microbes originating from the seed. This seed-derived microbiota is complemented and partly substituted gradually by rhizosphere microorganisms migrating into the plant via roots. Plant–microbe partnerships occur at different levels of complexity. (B) The plant interacts with single organisms. It responds to the presence of a microbe and its metabolites and vice versa the microbe is affected by the plant environment and reacts to plant metabolism and physiology. (C) The plant interacts with the microbiota in the soil and rhizosphere. Plant exudates attract microbes in the soil thereby directing a subset of them to the root zone. In turn, the activity of the microbiota in the root zone has strong impact on plant growth and health. (D) The microorganisms within the root and rhizosphere microbiota dynamically interact with each other and the microbiota in the root.

Although most work on host-microbe interactions has been focused on animal systems such as corals, sponges, or humans, there is a substantial body of literature on plant holobionts. Plant-associated microbial communities impact both key components of the fitness of plants, growth and survival, and are shaped by nutrient availability and plant defense mechanisms. Several habitats have been investigated as harbouring plant-associated microbes, including the rhizoplane (surface of root tissue), the rhizosphere (periphery of the roots), the endosphere (inside plant tissue), and the phyllosphere (total above-ground surface area). The holobiont concept originally suggested a significant fraction of the microbiome genome together with the host genome is transmitted from one generation to the next and thus can propagate unique properties of the holobiont. In this regard, studies have shown that seeds can play such a role. Evidence of this process have been recently proven showing that the majority, up to 95%, of the seed microbiome is mistranslated across generations.

The plant holobiont is relatively well-studied, with particular focus on agricultural species such as legumes and grains. Bacteria, fungi, archaea, protists, and viruses are all members of the plant holobiont. The bacteria phyla known to be part of the plant holobiont are Actinomycetota, Bacteroidota, Bacillota, and Pseudomonadota. For example, nitrogen-fixers such as Azotobacter (Proteobacteria) and Bacillus (Firmicutes) greatly improve plant performance. Fungi of the phyla Ascomycota, Basidiomycota, and Glomeromycota colonize plant tissues and provide a variety of functions for the plant host. Arbuscular mycorrhizal fungi (Glomeromycota), for instance, are common across plant groups and provide improved nutrient acquisition, temperature and drought resistance, and reduced pathogen load. Epichloë species (Ascomycota) are part of the meadow fescue holobiont and provide herbivore resistance by producing ergot alkaloids, which cause ergotism in mammals. Protist members of the plant holobiont are less well-studied, with most knowledge oriented towards pathogens. However, there are examples of commensalistic plant-protist associations, such as Phytomonas (Trypanosomatidae).

Like all other organisms, plants do not lead solitary lives, as there are myriads of microbes and viruses living around and within them. Some microbes, whether endophytic or epiphytic, play diverse roles in supporting healthy plant growth, whereas others are pathogenic, which can become dominant over the beneficial ones to cause disease. In recent years, various cutting-edge tools developed for studying the associations between microbes and plants and extensive modern research on plant microbiomes have dramatically furthered knowledge on ecological functions and key roles of the plant microbiome in supporting plant adaptability to dynamic environments. Currently, plant-associated microorganisms are considered reservoirs of additional genes and traits, which are critical to the growth and development of the host. Furthermore, the plant pathobiome—which represents the disease-causing agents in the context of the interaction between the microbial communities and plant host in its biotic environment—is another important component of the plant microbiome that remains relatively understudied.

Research focussing on the widely accepted one pathogen–one disease hypothesis has led to many breakthroughs, such as the identification of diseases and novel disease-causing organisms, as well as the development of control strategies using effective compounds against individual pathogens, which have proven successful in controlling several diseases. However, this came at the cost of neglect of plant pathology in a holistic approach—or systems-based plant pathology—in which communities and their interactions are considered rather than individual organisms. This reductionist scheme has limited our ability to overcome certain important challenges, such as the emergence of novel and severe diseases, with little that could be done to counter these diseases without considering the associated biotic factors.

== The plant holobiont ==
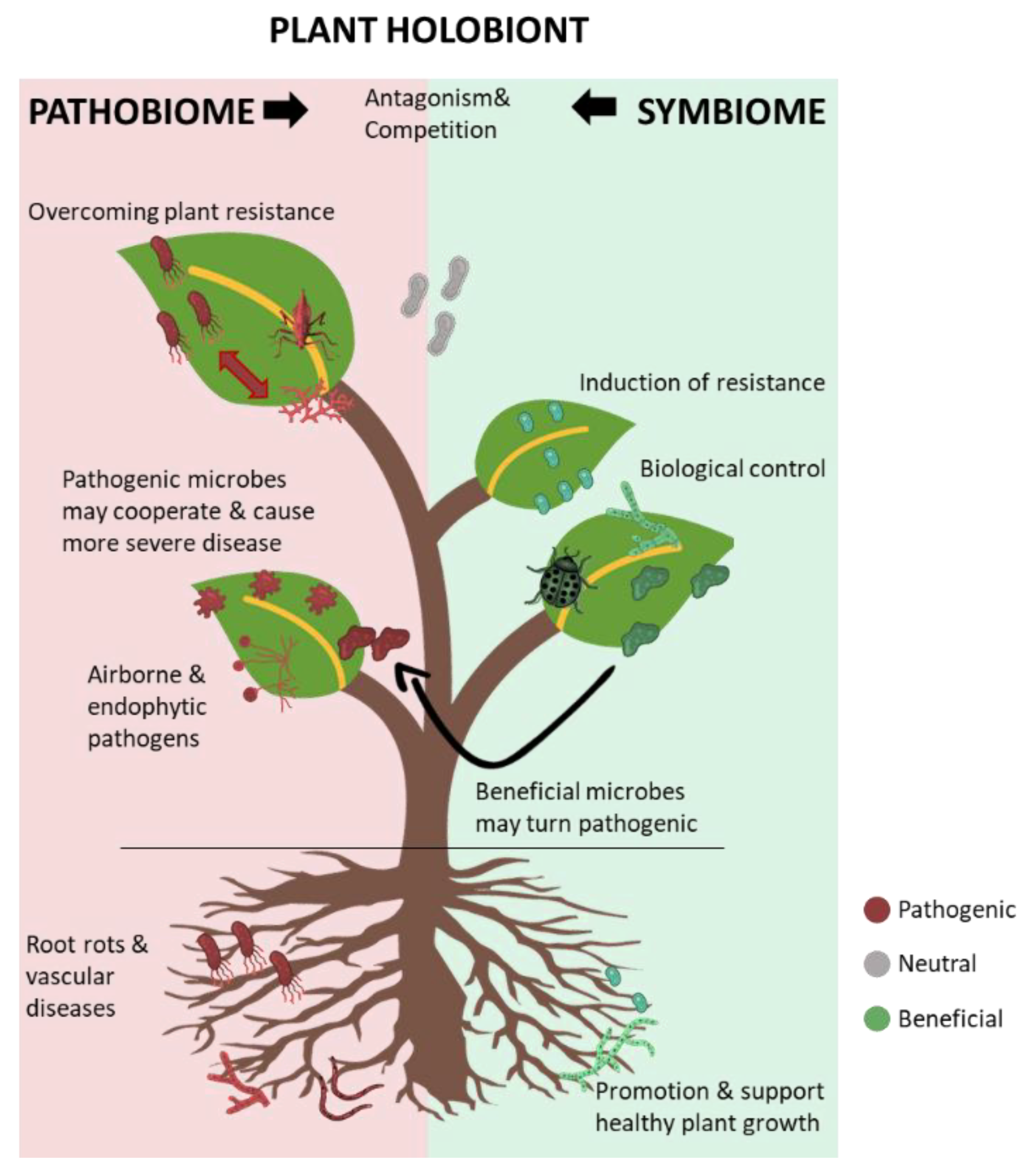
Plant holobiont as a complex system This includes beneficial plant-associated microbes—the symbiome—and the collective pathogenic microbes—the pathobiome. The beneficial and pathogenic microbes are in continuous antagonism and competition for space and nutrients. When pathogenic microbes prevail, they interfere with normal plant functions, leading to disease development. Co-operative interactions amongst pathogenic microbes may result in more severe disease and multiple infections. The stable, beneficial plant microbiome may be altered to facilitate the development of certain diseases, as observed in the olive knot disease.

As functional macrobes living in a close association with diverse communities of microbes and viruses, plants should be considered a "holobiont", viewed as a complex system in continuous interaction with the resident microbes and the surrounding environment. The microbes with their functional genes represent the plant microbiome, or the phytobiome, and their composition may differ among individual plants, as well as across various stages of growth or sites and tissues of the same plant. Despite the extensive taxonomic overlap between the microbiomes of different plant tissues, each compartment exhibits a unique composition of strains and species, as evidenced from the specificity of different operational taxonomic units (OTUs) in various tissues of plants within the same genus. The beneficial roles of microbes associated with plants include, but are not limited to, supporting plant growth at different stages starting from seed germination, promoting plant resistance to biotic and abiotic stresses, and assisting plants in nutrient uptake. The plant growth-promoting bacteria and the arbuscular mycorrhiza represent the beneficial microbes that are mostly involved in supporting plant growth and nutrition by facilitating nutrients mobilisation. The mycorrhizae were even reported to manipulate plant hormonal signalling to facilitate their colonisation of the root surface in a way similar to the mechanisms of some pathogenic microbes, while in this case, the hijacking is beneficial for the host plant.

Alternatively, pathogenic microbes are also a part of the phytobiome, although this concept has been partly overlooked in most studies on this topic. Despite their presence within the microbial communities, pathogenic microbes are differentiated from the rest of the phytobiome based on their ability to damage the plant tissues through transient blooming under specific conditions, which is consistent with the core concept of the disease triangle in epidemiology.

Defining specific taxonomic groups as pathogenic or beneficial could be misleading, as some microbial genera might include beneficial members that support growth at certain stages of a plant species, but are pathogenic at another stage or to other plant species. For instance, while some members of the genus Rhizoctonia are essential for promoting seed germination and supporting the growth of certain orchid species, others are devastating pathogens causing seedling damping-off, root rot, stem rot, and canker in several plants and even post-harvest rot in some crops. Therefore, studying the types and taxonomic composition of plant microbiomes might not be sufficient to completely understand the roles of the plant microbiome, and the functional potential of the characterised microbial structure must be investigated within their communities. Studies have shown that under specific conditions, the stable, beneficial plant microbiome may be altered to facilitate the development and establishment of certain diseases. A model representing this phenomenon is the olive knot disease caused by Pseudomonas savastanoi pv. Savastanoi. The knots formed by Pseudomonas savastanoi pv. Savastanoi in the aerial parts of olive trees harbour a specific multi-species community of endophytic non-pathogenic bacteria, which cooperate with the main causative bacteria to enhance disease severity. The well-documented co-existence and shared quorum-sensing signals of specific bacterial communities of Pantoea and Erwinia in the olive knots and the causative agent Pseudomonas savastanoi pv. Savastanoi in different olive-growing regions of the world suggests the co-evolution and conserved roles of this bacterial consortium in promoting disease development. Co-inoculation of Pantoea and Erwinia species with Pseudomonas savastanoi pv. Savastanoi facilitated bacterial colonisation, nutrient exploitation, plant defence disruption, and knot enlargement.

In this context, plant pathogenic microbes may specifically manipulate the structure of the plant microbiome to generate conditions conducive to their own survival and colonisation. Kim et al. demonstrated that the plant pathogen Burkholderia glumae employs the specific type-6 secretion system (T6SS) for interaction with rice endophytic microbes, thereby reducing the populations of specific bacterial genera, such as Luteibacter and Dyella, which promote plant growth and contribute to protection against pathogenic bacteria. Metagenomic analysis in their study also revealed significant changes in the community structure of endophytic microbiota in infected rice plants compared with non-infected plants or plants infected with a T6SS-defective B. glumae mutant. Specifically, these changes facilitated the colonisation and establishment of B. glumae at the early stages of infection.

Another example in which the plant-associated beneficial bacteria turn harmful under specific conditions to support the development of the disease is the root-knot caused by the nematode Meloidogyne incognita. Nematode infection is associated with the presence of specific microbes harbouring abundant genes involved in pathogenesis, such as genes encoding plant polysaccharide-degrading enzymes. Hence, assessments of the taxonomic composition should always be aligned to functional analyses of the existing microbial communities, and the plant holobiont should be separated into the symbiome or pathobiome under specific conditions based on function rather than taxonomy. Overall, the plant holobiont could be represented as a never-ending war between the allies of pathogenic microbes, as the pathobiome, and the key beneficial microbes, as the symbiome.

== Symbiotic relationships ==
Under natural conditions, plants are always associated with a well-orchestrated community of microbes — the phytomicrobiome. The nature and degree of microbial effect on the plant host can be positive, neutral, or negative, and depends largely on the environment. The phytomicrobiome is integral for plant growth and function; microbes play a key role in plant nutrient acquisition, biotic and abiotic stress management, physiology regulation through microbe-to-plant signals, and growth regulation via the production of phytohormones. Relationships between the plant and phytomicrobiome members vary in intimacy, ranging from casual associations between roots and the rhizosphere microbial community, to endophytes that live between plant cells, to the endosymbiosis of microbes by the plant cell resulting in mitochondria and chloroplasts. If we consider these key organelles to also be members of the phytomicrobiome, how do we distinguish between the two? If we accept the mitochondria and chloroplasts as both members of the phytomicrobiome and the plant (entrained microbes), the influence of microbes on the evolution of plants becomes so profound that without microbes, the concept of the "plant" is not viable.

The phytomicrobiome is composed of a community of microorganisms that associate and interact with a host plant including bacteria, archaea, fungi, oomycetes, viruses, protozoa, algae, and nematodes. Collectively, the plant and its phytomicrobiome are a holobiont, a term originally coined by Adolf Meyer-Abich but most frequently associated with and popularized by Lynn Margulis and rigorously explored by Bordenstein and Theis. While the phytomicrobiome includes parasitic and commensal microbes, it also includes mutualists, or beneficial microbes, such as mycorrhizal fungi (MF) and plant growth-promoting bacteria (PGPB) that enable the plant holobiont to survive within a wide range of environments. Beneficial microbes mediate plant holobiont responses to abiotic and biotic stresses and allow the plant holobiont to adapt to environmental variations. The plant host can then modify the abundance and composition of beneficial microbial species within the phytomicrobiome, at least in part, by secreting biochemical compounds. This selection occurs most strongly in the endosphere, followed by the rhizoplane, and finally the rhizosphere. For example, root exudates can select for and promote the growth of certain beneficial microbes by serving as carbon and/or energy sources for microbial metabolism.

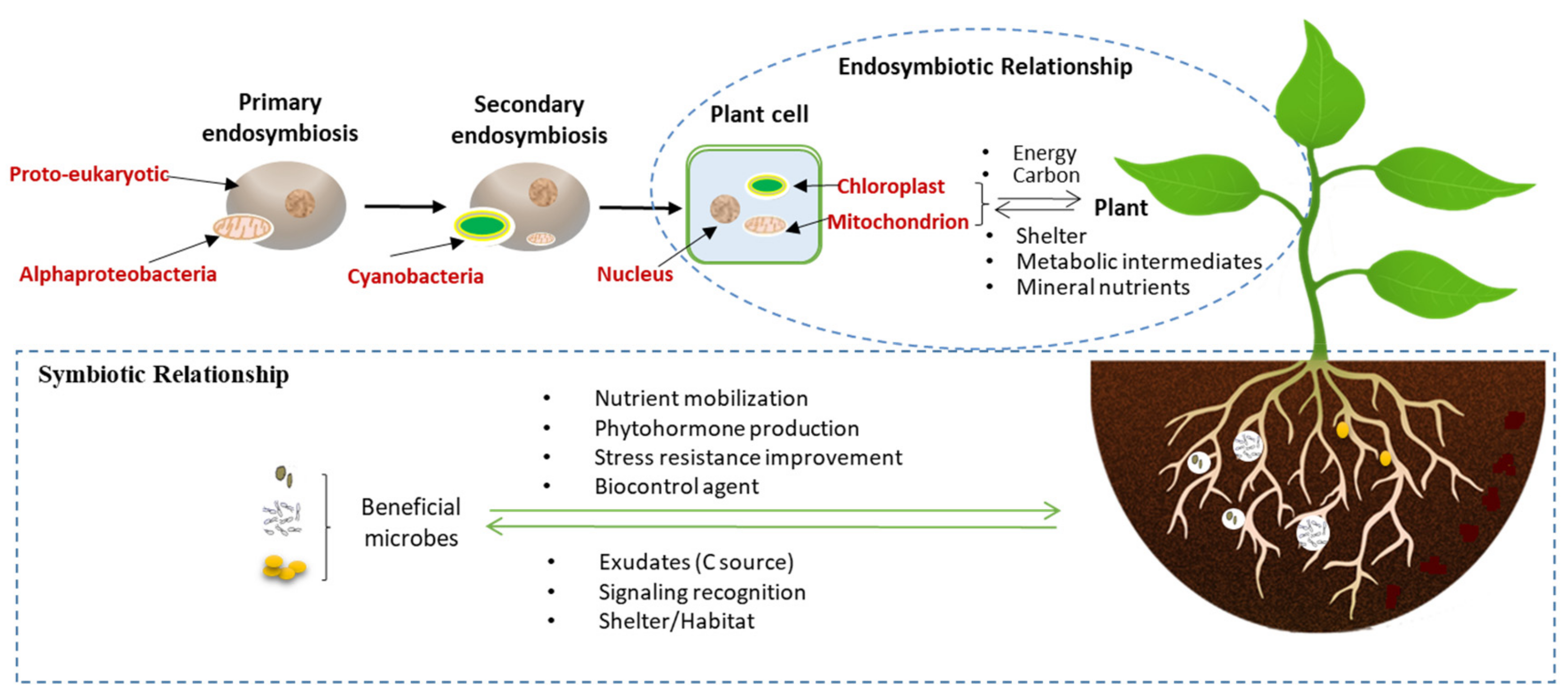
The origin of mitochondria and chloroplasts...as modified prokaryotes that have become plant organelles, the endosymbiotic relationship between chloroplast, mitochondrion, and plant itself, and the symbiotic relationships between the beneficial microbes and the host plant. Beneficial microbes include plant growth promoting bacteria and fungi. The shelter and habitat created by the plant host provide a regulated environment and energy source, enhancing the survival of the symbionts and endosymbionts.

The earliest and arguably most essential example of a specific symbiotic function within the plant holobiome arose from the endosymbiosis of an alphaproteobacterium and a cyanobacterium. These microbes are now the mitochondrion and chloroplast, respectively, and are microbes that have been fully integrated into plant cells (see diagram). These endosymbionts did not replace particular functions of the ancestral organism, but rather provided new functions, giving an evolutionarily competitive edge to the newly evolving plants.

In this paper, we focus on how beneficial bacteria and fungi, a relatively small fraction of the phytomicrobiome, have had a disproportionately large influence on plant holobiont evolution. We also review the fundamental roles that the phytomicrobiome plays in plant holobiont development and survival. Finally, we propose that a greater integration of holobiont theory should be incorporated into the plant sciences.

== Origin of the plant holobiont ==
- Endosymbiosis of prokaryotes and the rise of plant holobionts

Life on earth is believed to stem from a single origin, the microbial ancestor that emerged as early as 3.5 billion years ago. According to endosymbiosis theory, about 1.5 billion years ago, a proto-eukaryotic cell engulfed an alphaproteobacteria, forming an endosymbiotic relationship, and gradually developed into what is now recognized as the mitochondrion (see diagram). Mitochondria use alternative electron acceptors to generate adenosine triphosphate (ATP) and are now the most important organelle for plant respiration since they enable metabolic reactions to convert energy into usable forms.

Approximately half of a billion years later, eukaryotic cells containing mitochondria engulfed cyanobacteria (photosynthetic prokaryotes), which like the alphaproteobacteria became fully incorporated into and dependent on plant cells, resulting in the chloroplast (diagram). Chloroplasts convert energy from the sun into carbohydrates, using water as the electron donor. However, large-scale gene loss from plastids has occurred during the course of evolution, and higher plant chloroplasts now contain only 120–130 genes compared with the 1700 to 7500 genes contained in cyanobacterial genomes. In spite of their reduced genome size, chloroplasts and cyanobacteria still carry out some of the same functions, ranging from gene expression to metabolism. For example, it is clear that the protein targeting system of cyanobacteria is similar to that of the chloroplast.

Organisms have been described as entities evolved from constituent elements that are highly cooperative and minimally conflicting; however, there is ongoing debate regarding the levels of cooperation and conflict within holobionts. In plants, chloroplasts and mitochondria are highly cooperative with plant cells while relationships between the plant and the phytomicrobiome are more varied including the mutualistic and parasitic interactions. For example, relationships between plants and PGPB are organismal given that they are highly cooperative and low conflict in nature. On the other hand, some plant-microbe interactions are more opportunistic for one member and therefore are not organismal. The plant is therefore a eukaryotic organism, with prokaryotic constituents (entrained microbes), that interacts with its phytomicrobiome to form the plant holobiont. As a result, the difference between the plant and the phytomicrobiome blurs and the concept of the holobiont becomes pre-eminent. It can then be argued that the influence of microbes on the evolution of plants is so profound that without microbes, the concept of the "plant" fails.

=== Transition to land ===
The phytomicrobiome helps the plant holobiont survive in a variety of environments. In fact, early in their evolution, plants could not have successfully transitioned from the aquatic environments inhabited by their ancestors without functional support from the phytomicrobiome. The phytomicrobiome has likely been shaped to impart additional genes to the holobiont, therefore altering the niches available to the plant; this allows the plant to adjust its behavior to suit the conditions of its immediate environment. A selective advantage provides the plant holobiont with functional plasticity, allowing it to better access resources and improve its nutrition, growth, and stress tolerance. For further analysis on the roles in which the phytomicrobiome plays in plant holobiont evolution, see several recent reviews.

== See also ==
- Seagrass holobiont
