= Spermosphere =

Region of soil surrounding a germinating seed

In plant science, the spermosphere is the zone surrounding a seed where soil, microorganisms, and seed germinating interact. The zone is a small area, typically 1–10 mm from the seed, but varying with seed type, the variety of soil microorganisms, the level of soil moisture, and other factors.

== Importance ==
Within the spermosphere, a range of complex interactions take place among the germinating seed, the soil, and the microbiome. Because germination is a brief process, the spermosphere is transient, but the impact of the microbial activity within the spermosphere can have strong and long-lasting effects on the developing plant. The spermosphere can even have impacts on managing stress during germination, as seen with Bacillus strains and peanut plants.

== Factors that influence spermosphere ==
Seeds exude various molecules that influence their surrounding microbial communities, either inhibiting or stimulating their growth. The composition of the exudates varies according to the plant type and such properties of the soil as its pH and moisture content. Soil type matters much more than seed type, specifically soil with a higher content of organic matter.

With these biochemical effects, the spermosphere develops both downward—to form the rhizosphere (upon the emergence of the plant's radicle)—and upward to form the laimosphere, which is the soil surrounding the growing plant stem, and the phyllosphere, which is the microbial community on the part of the plant above the soil. Specifically, the floral microbiota can play a role in the composition of the spermosphere like in plants such as wheat, grapevine, and rice. As the seed germinates, the function of the microbial community changes rather than its composition.

== Protection of the seed ==
The spermosphere also acts as biological control for the germinating seed which means certain beneficial microorganisms can protect the seed from plant pathogens. Many plant pathogens such as Fusarium and Pythium ultimum can colonize a newly germinating seed within the first few hours of planting. The seed can exudate molecules and nutrients that attract beneficial microorganisms to their spermosphere which then prevent the colonization of pathogens. There has been specific research in this area with cottonseeds in which they were coated with a beneficial bacteria which prevented the seed from being infected with a Pythium ultimum infection.
