= Streptomyces pini =

Scientific classification
- Domain: Bacteria
- Kingdom: Bacillati
- Phylum: Actinomycetota
- Class: Actinomycetia
- Order: Streptomycetales
- Family: Streptomycetaceae
- Genus: Streptomyces
- Species: S. pini

Binomial name
- Streptomyces pini Madhaiyan et al. 2016

Type strain
- ICMP 17783, NRRL B-24728, PL19

Species of bacterium

Streptomyces pini is a bacterium species from the genus of Streptomyces which has been isolated from the phylloplane of a pine (Pinus sylvestris) in Coimbatore in India.

== See also ==
- List of Streptomyces species
