= Laimosphere =

Microbiologically-enriched zone of soil that surrounds plant stems

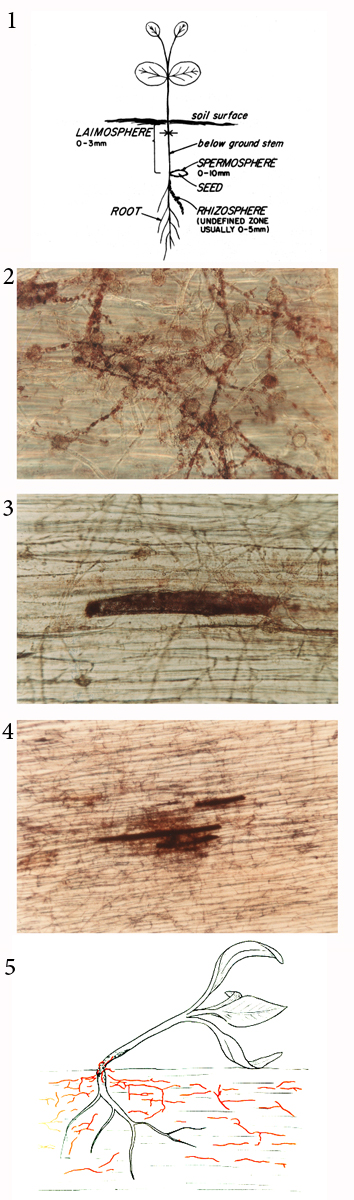
Fig. 1. A diagram denoting the location of the laimosphere, rhizosphere, and spermosphere of the subterranean organs of a plant (Plant and Soil 37:187-190, 1972). Fig. 2. Chlamydospores of Fusarium solani f. sp. cucurbitae forming in the laimosphere of a squash hypocotyl, Magyarosy 1973. Fig. 3 & 4. Early lesion development in the epidermis of a squash hypocotyl caused by Fusarium solani stained with tetrazolium salt, Magyarosy 1973. Fig. 5. Diagram of hypocotyl stem rot leading to "damping-off" caused by Rhizoctonia solani (Univ.Calif. Agr. Exp. Sta. Service Manual 23, 1957).

The laimosphere is the microbiologically enriched zone of soil that surrounds below-ground portions of plant stems; the laimosphere is analogous to the rhizosphere and spermosphere. The combining form laim- from laimos (Greek: λαιμός, "throat") denotes a connecting organ (neck) while -sphere indicates a zone of influence. Topographically, the laimosphere includes the soil around any portion of subterranean plant organs other than roots where exuded nutrients (especially sugars and amino acids) stimulate microbial activities. Subterranean plant organs with a laimosphere include hypocotyls, epicotyls, stems, stolons, corms, bulbs, and leaves. Propagules of soil-borne plant pathogens, whose germination is stimulated by a plant exudates in the laimosphere, can initiate hypocotyl and stem rots leading to "damping-off". Pathogens commonly found to cause such diseases are species of Fusarium, Phoma, Phytophthora, Pythium, Rhizoctonia and Sclerotinia.

The laimosphere is actively impacted by the unique adaptations that each plants employs in response to their environments, so the content of the microbial community that makes up the laimosphere is custom-tailored by each plant's individual traits and needs. These unique microenvironments vary in microbial diversity and function, and are therefore crucial for understanding how plants cope with environmental conditions. For instance, microbial communities in the laimosphere are distinct from those in the phyllosphere (the plant's aerial surfaces), with specific taxa adapted to the soil's unique moisture and nutrient availability. Different plants support different types of microbes in their laimospheres. This means that the specific conditions each plant creates (like moisture levels and nutrient availability) attract certain microbes that are best suited to those conditions.

The microbes in the laimosphere play important roles, such as helping the plant absorb nutrients and protect against stressors like drought or salinity. This interaction between the plants and their microbial companions in the laimosphere helps the whole ecosystem function better, making it possible for plants to thrive in challenging environments.

== Sources ==
- Atkinson, T. G., et al. 1974. Root rot reaction in wheat resistance not mediated by rhizosphere or laimosphere antagonists. Phytopathology 64:97-101.
- Baker, K.F. 1957. The U.C. system for producing healthy container-grown plants. Univ.Calif. Agr. Exp. Sta. Service Manual 23.
- Hakobyan, A., Velte, S., Sickel, W. et al. 2023. Tillandsia landbeckii phyllosphere and laimosphere as refugia for bacterial life in a hyperarid desert environment. Microbiome 11:246.
- Hancock, J. G. 1977. Soluble metabolites in intercellular regions of squash hypocotyl tissues: implications for exudation. Plant and Soil 47:103-112.
- Johnson, L. F., and N. G. Bartley. 1981. Cotton laimosphere populations of microorganisms and their antibiotic effect on Pythium ultimum. Phytopathology 71:884-981.
- Kasuya, M., et al. 2006. Induction of soil suppressiveness against Rhizoctonia solani by incorporation of dried plant residues into soil. Phytopathology 96: 1372-1379.
- Magyarosy, A. C. 1973. Effect of squash mosaic virus infection on microbial populations around the hypocotyl and chloroplast structure and function. Ph.D. Dissertation, Univ. Calif., Berkeley.
- Magyarosy, A., and J. G. Hancock. 1972. Microbial population of the laimosphere of squash (Cucurbita maxima) Plant and Soil 37:187-190.
- Magyarosy, A. C., and J. G. Hancock. 1974. Association of virus-induced changes in laimosphere microflora and hypocotyl exudation with protection to Fusarium stem rot. Phytopathology 64:994-1000.
- Martirosyan, V., Steinberger, Y. 2014. Microbial functional diversity in the phyllosphere and laimosphere of different desert plants. Journal of Arid Environments, 107:26-33.
- Martirosyan, V., Unc, A., Miller, G. et al. 2016. Desert Perennial Shrubs Shape the Microbial-Community Miscellany in Laimosphere and Phyllosphere Space. Microbial Ecology 72, 659–668.
