= Plant microbiome =

Assembly of microorganisms near plants

The plant microbiome, also known as the phytomicrobiome, plays roles in plant health and productivity and has received significant attention in recent years. The microbiome has been defined as "a characteristic microbial community occupying a reasonably well-defined habitat which has distinct physio-chemical properties. The term thus not only refers to the microorganisms involved but also encompasses their theatre of activity".

Plants live in association with diverse microbial consortia. These microbes, referred to as the plant's microbiota, live both inside (the endosphere) and outside (the episphere) of plant tissues, and play important roles in the ecology and physiology of plants. "The core plant microbiome is thought to comprise keystone microbial taxa that are important for plant fitness and established through evolutionary mechanisms of selection and enrichment of microbial taxa containing essential functions genes for the fitness of the plant holobiont."

Plant microbiomes are shaped by both factors related to the plant itself, such as genotype, organ, species and health status, as well as factors related to the plant's environment, such as management, land use and climate. The health status of a plant has been reported in some studies to be reflected by or linked to its microbiome.

== Overview ==
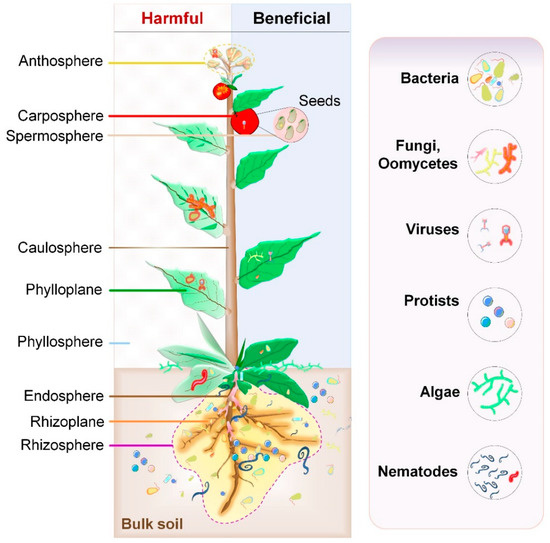
Microbiome in plant ecosystem Schematic plant and plant-associated microbiota colonizing different niches on and inside the plant tissue. All the above-ground plant parts together, called the phyllosphere, are a continuously evolving habitat due to ultraviolet (UV) radiation and altering climatic conditions. It is primarily composed of leaves. Below-ground plant parts, mainly roots, are generally influenced by soil properties. Harmful interactions affect the plant growth through pathogenic activities of some microbiota members (left side). On the other hand, beneficial microbial interactions promote plant growth (right side).

The study of the association of plants with microorganisms precedes that of the animal and human microbiomes, notably the roles of microbes in nitrogen and phosphorus uptake. The most notable examples are plant root-arbuscular mycorrhizal (AM) and legume-rhizobial symbioses, both of which greatly influence the ability of roots to uptake various nutrients from the soil. Some of these microbes cannot survive in the absence of the plant host (obligate symbionts include viruses and some bacteria and fungi), which provides space, oxygen, proteins, and carbohydrates to the microorganisms. The association of AM fungi with plants has been known since 1842, and over 80% of land plants are found associated with them. It is thought AM fungi helped in the domestication of plants.

In this animation a root tuber is being colonized by an arbuscular mycorrhizal fungus (AMF)

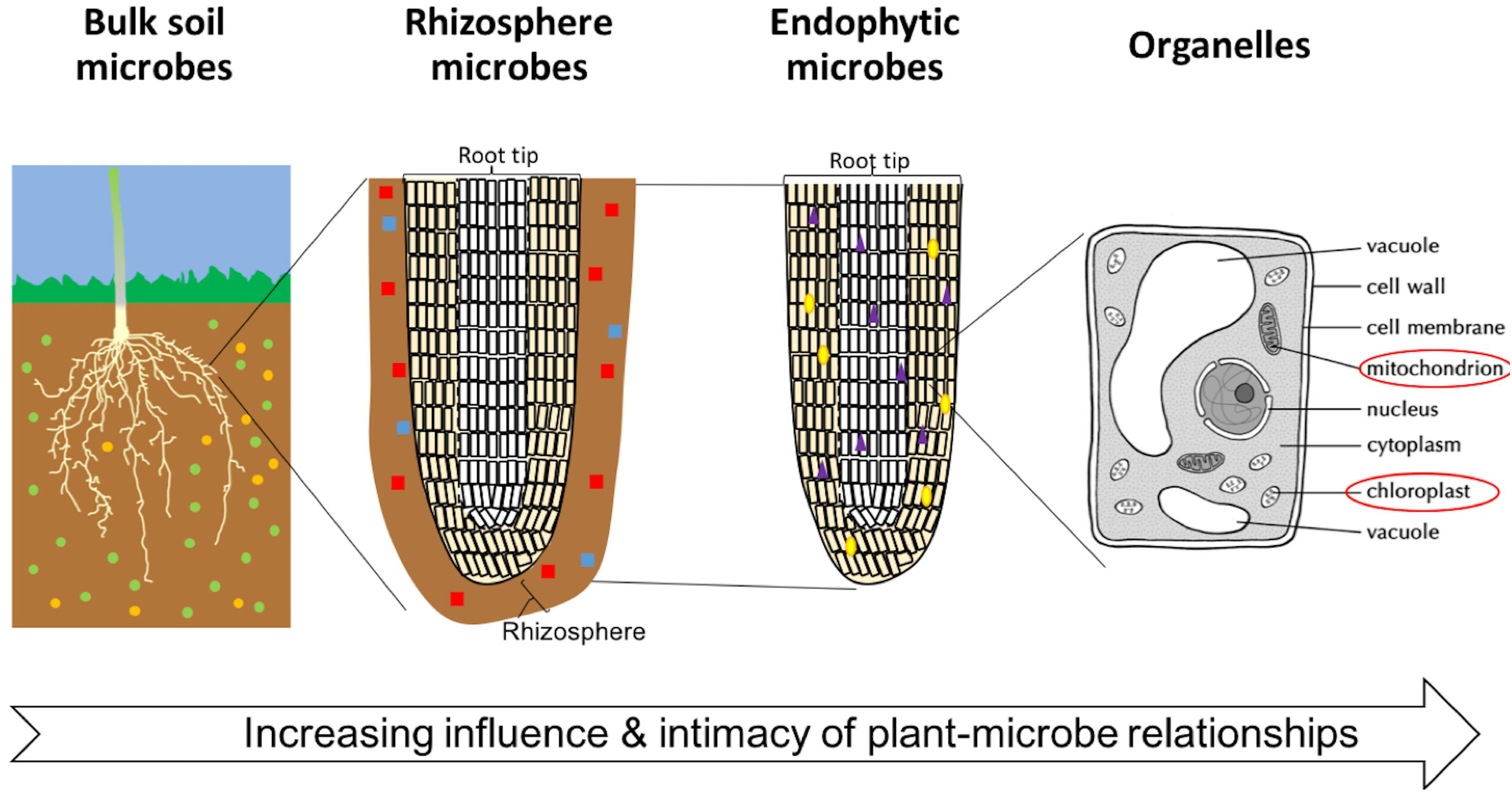
Microbes are represented by small coloured shapes. Diversity and number of microbes is variable between soils, distance from plant roots, crop species, and plant tissue.

Traditionally, plant-microbe interaction studies have been confined to culturable microbes. The numerous microbes that could not be cultured have remained uninvestigated, so knowledge of their roles is largely unknown. The possibilities of unraveling the types and outcomes of these plant-microbe interactions has generated considerable interest among ecologists, evolutionary biologists, plant biologists, and agronomists. Recent developments in multiomics and the establishment of large collections of microorganisms have dramatically increased knowledge of the plant microbiome composition and diversity. The sequencing of marker genes of entire microbial communities, referred to as metagenomics, sheds light on the phylogenetic diversity of the microbiomes of plants. It also adds to the knowledge of the major biotic and abiotic factors responsible for shaping plant microbiome community assemblages.

The composition of microbial communities associated with different plant species is correlated with the phylogenetic distance between the plant species, that is, closely related plant species tend to have more alike microbial communities than distant species. The composition of these microbiomes is dynamic and can be modulated by the environment and by climatic conditions. The focus of plant microbiome studies has been directed at model plants, such as Arabidopsis thaliana, as well as important economic crop species including barley (Hordeum vulgare), corn (Zea mays), rice (Oryza sativa), soybean (Glycine max), wheat (Triticum aestivum), whereas less attention has been given to fruit crops and tree species.

== Plant microbiota ==
Cyanobacteria are an example of a microorganism which widely interacts in a symbiotic manner with land plants. Cyanobacteria can enter the plant through the stomata and colonise the intercellular space, forming loops and intracellular coils. Anabaena spp. colonize the roots of wheat and cotton plants. Calothrix sp. has also been found on the root system of wheat. Monocots, such as wheat and rice, have been colonised by Nostoc spp., In 1991, Ganther and others isolated diverse heterocystous nitrogen-fixing cyanobacteria, including Nostoc, Anabaena and Cylindrospermum, from plant root and soil. Assessment of wheat seedling roots revealed two types of association patterns: loose colonization of root hair by Anabaena and tight colonization of the root surface within a restricted zone by Nostoc.

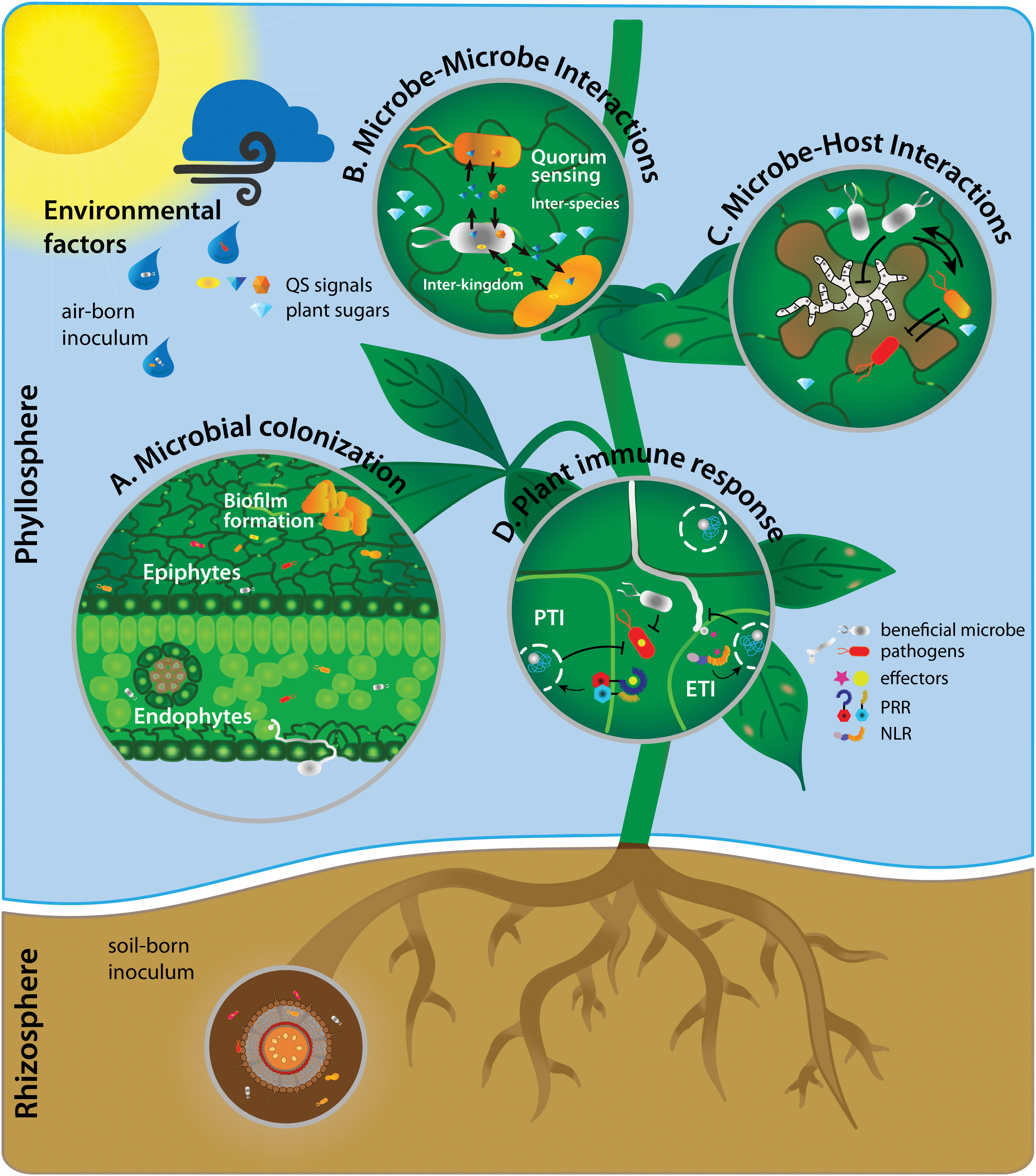
Microbial colonization of the phyllosphere and rhizosphere Microbial colonisation occurs both in the above-ground part of the plant (phyllosphere), as well as the below-ground part (rhizosphere). (A) The microbial colonisation on the leaf takes place on the leaf surface (epiphytes) from air-borne and soil-borne inocula and the inner leaf part (endophytes). Microbial colonisation can lead to exogenous intraspecies biofilm formation on the leaf surface. (B) Microbe–microbe interactions occur between interspecies and interkingdoms, referred to as quorum sensing. Quorum-sensing molecules impacting microbial recognition and biofilm formation on leaves. (C) Pathogenic microbes colonize host plants by means of their virulence. The genetic make-up of both the host and pathogen contributes to disease progression. However, other microbes in the host phyllosphere can influence this plant–pathogen interaction by either facilitation or antagonism. (D) Plant immune responses are of specific interest as host–microbe interactions shaping the phyllosphere microbiome. Non-host-adapted pathogens are involved in PAMP-triggered immunity (PTI) and recognised via pattern recognition receptors (PRRs). Host-adapted microbes are recognised via nucleotide-binding leucine-rich repeat receptors (NLRs), summarised in effector-triggered immunity (ETI).

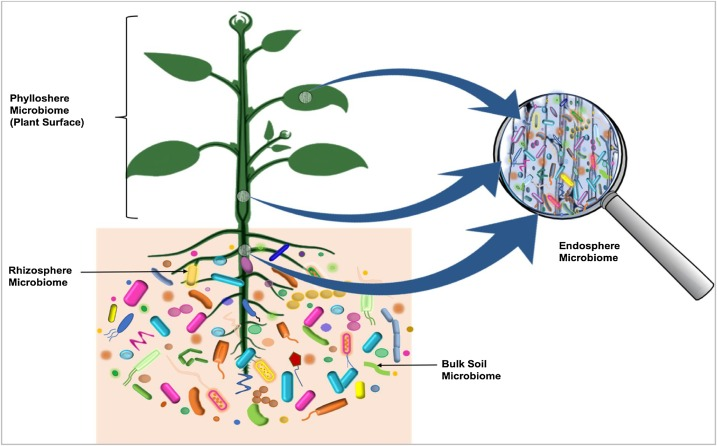
Diverse microbial communities of characteristic microbiota are part of plant microbiomes, and are found on the outside surfaces and in the internal tissues of the host plant, as well as in the surrounding soil.

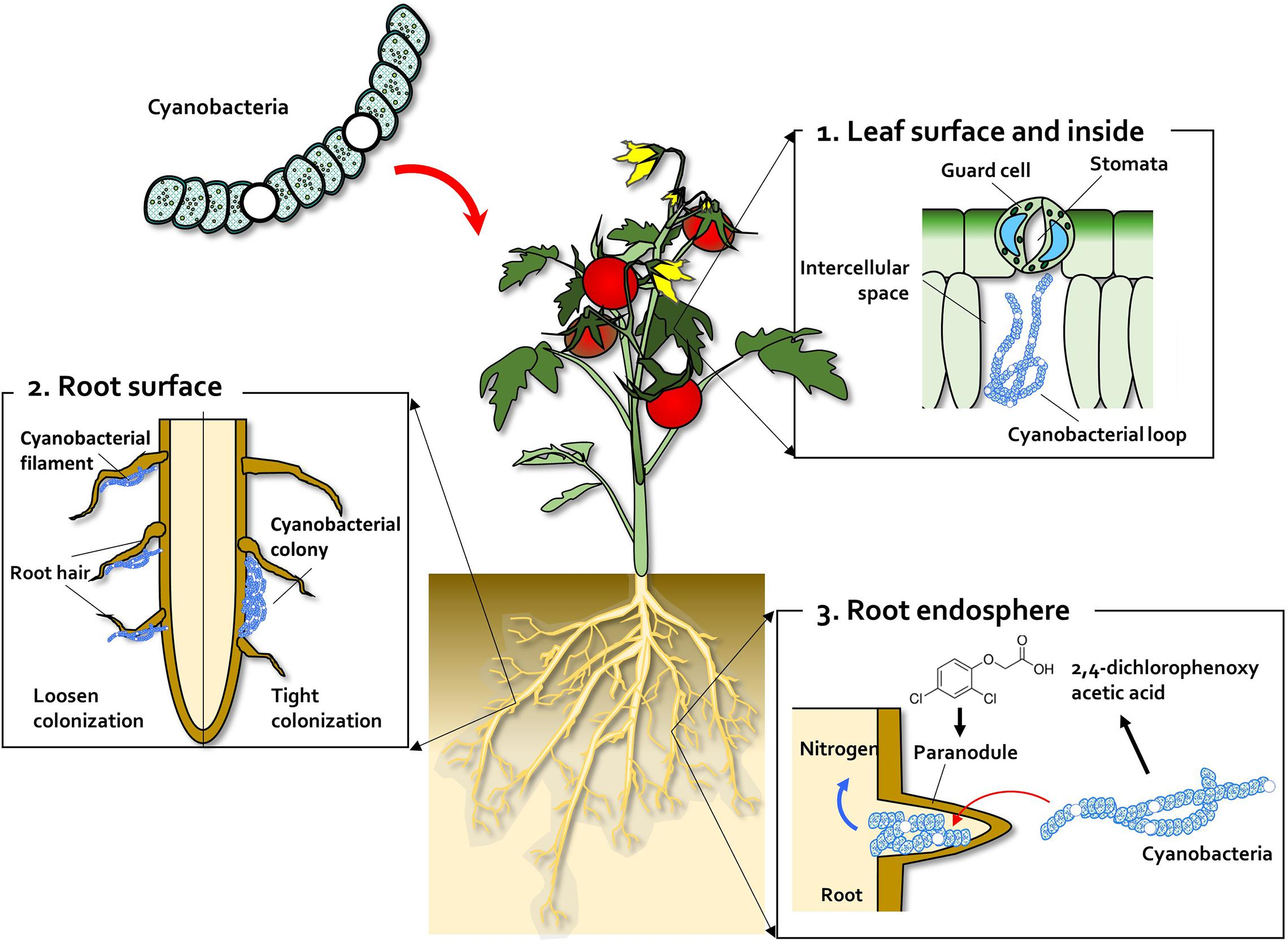
Symbiosis of cyanobacteria with land plants (1) Cyanobacteria enter the leaf tissue through the stomata and colonize the intercellular space, forming a cyanobacterial loop. (2) On the root surface, cyanobacteria exhibit two types of colonization pattern; in the root hair, filaments of Anabaena and Nostoc species form loose colonies, and in the restricted zone on the root surface, specific Nostoc species form cyanobacterial colonies. (3) Co-inoculation with 2,4-D and Nostoc spp. increases para-nodule formation and nitrogen fixation. A large number of Nostoc spp. isolates colonize the root endosphere and form para-nodules.

== Rhizosphere microbiome ==
The rhizosphere comprises the 1–10 mm zone of soil immediately surrounding the roots that is under the influence of the plant through its deposition of root exudates, mucilage and dead plant cells. A diverse array of organisms specialize in living in the rhizosphere, including bacteria, fungi, oomycetes, nematodes, algae, protozoa, viruses, and archaea.

Mycorrhizal fungi are abundant members of the rhizosphere community, and have been found in over 200,000 plant species, and are estimated to associate with over 80% of all plants. Mycorrhizae–root associations play profound roles in land ecosystems by regulating nutrient and carbon cycles. Mycorrhizae are integral to plant health because they provide up to 80% of the nitrogen and phosphorus requirements. In return, the fungi obtain carbohydrates and lipids from host plants. Recent studies of arbuscular mycorrhizal fungi using sequencing technologies show greater between-species and within-species diversity than previously known.

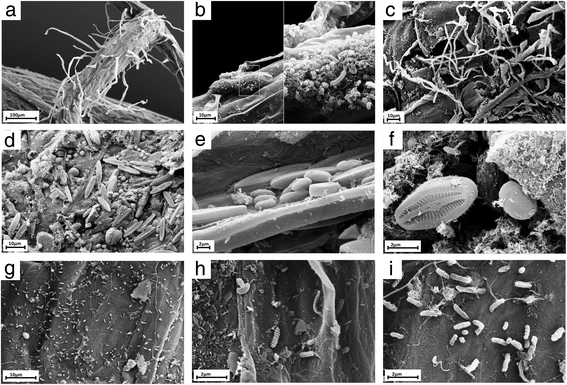
Microbial consortia naturally formed on the roots of Arabidopsis thaliana Scanning electron microscopy pictures of root surfaces from natural A. thaliana populations showing the complex microbial networks formed on roots. a) Overview of an A. thaliana root (primary root) with numerous root hairs. b) Biofilm-forming bacteria. c) Fungal or oomycete hyphae surrounding the root surface. d) Primary root densely covered by spores and protists. e, f) Protists, most likely belonging to the Bacillariophyceae class. g) Bacteria and bacterial filaments. h, i) Different bacterial individuals showing great varieties of shapes and morphological features.

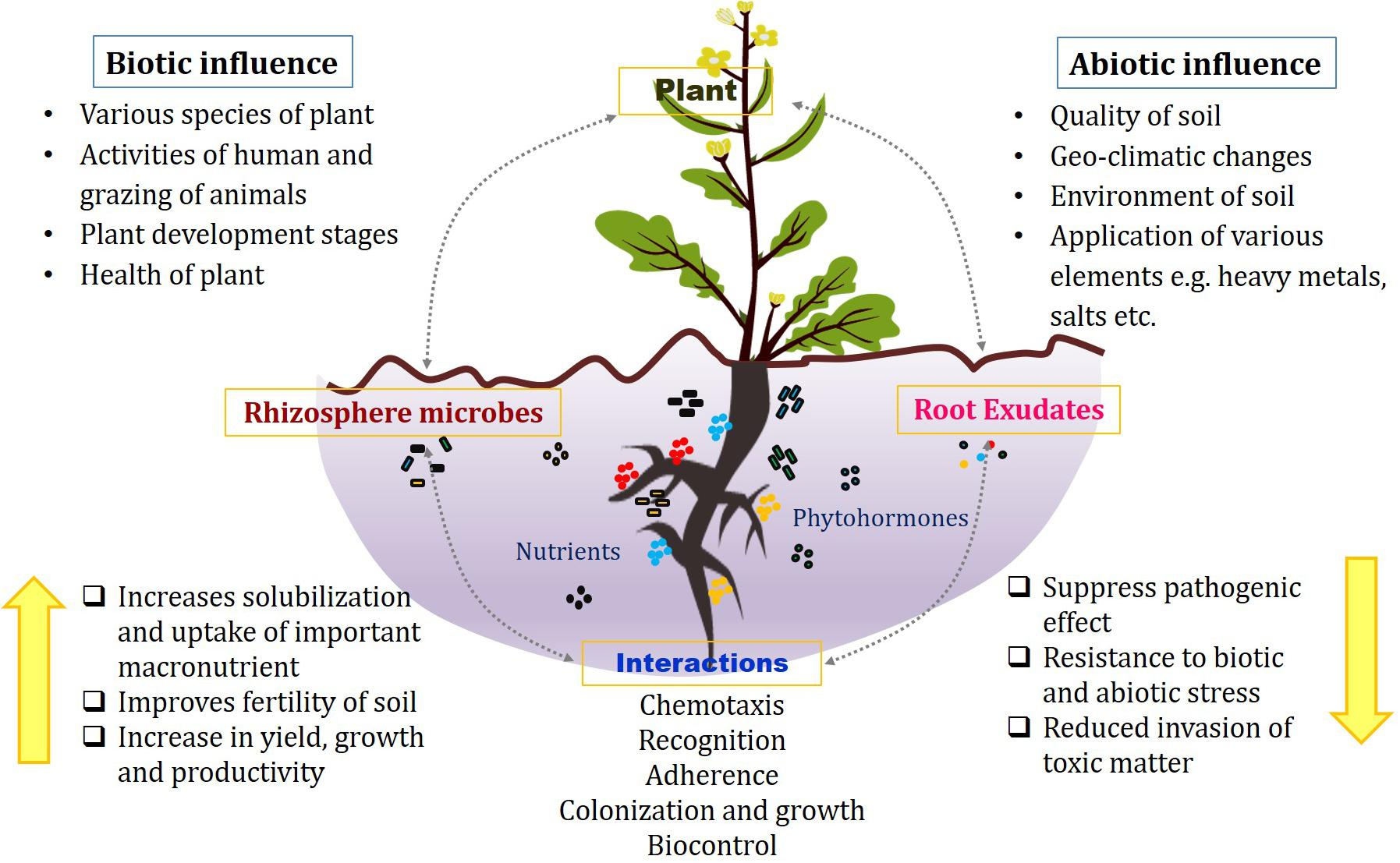
Associations in the rhizosphere between plant roots, microbes, and root exudates

"Experimental evidence underlines the importance of the root microbiome in plant health and it is becoming increasingly clear that the plant is able to control the composition of its microbiome. It stands to reason that those plants that manage their microbiome in a way that is beneficial to their reproductive success will be favored during evolutionary selection. It appears that such selective pressure has brought about many specific interactions between plants and microbes, and evidence is accumulating that plants call for microbial help in time of need."

— Berendsen et al, 2012

The most frequently studied beneficial rhizosphere organisms are mycorrhizae, rhizobium bacteria, plant-growth promoting rhizobacteria (PGPR), and biocontrol microbes. It has been projected that one gram of soil could contain more than one million distinct bacterial genomes, and over 50,000 OTUs (operational taxonomic units) have been found within the potato rhizosphere. Among the prokaryotes in the rhizosphere, the most frequent bacteria are within the Acidobacteriota, Pseudomonadota, Planctomycetota, Actinomycetota, Bacteroidota, and Bacillota. In some studies, no significant differences were reported in the microbial community composition between the bulk soil (soil not attached to the plant root) and rhizosphere soil. Certain bacterial groups (e.g. Actinomycetota, Xanthomonadaceae) are less abundant in the rhizosphere than in nearby bulk soil . Beyond facilitating access to nutrients and to provide protection to biotic and abiotic stresses, certain PGPR modify root architecture.

== Endosphere microbiome ==
Some microorganisms, such as endophytes, penetrate and occupy the plant internal tissues, forming the endospheric microbiome. The arbuscular mycorrhizal and other endophytic fungi are the dominant colonizers of the endosphere. Bacteria, and to some degree archaea, are important members of endosphere communities. Some of these endophytic microbes interact with their host and provide obvious benefits to plants. Unlike the rhizosphere and the rhizoplane, the endospheres harbor highly specific microbial communities. The root endophytic community can be very distinct from that of the adjacent soil community. In general, diversity of the endophytic community is lower than the diversity of the microbial community outside the plant. The identity and diversity of the endophytic microbiome of above-and below-ground tissues may also differ within the plant.

In 2025, the "tree microbiome" was presented in an article in the journal Nature. The focus was microbial symbionts regularly found in the wood of trees with even very large trunk diameters. Distinctly different microbes were found not only in diverse tree species but also as they varied between the sapwood and the deep heartwood. As reported in the New York Times, "Sapwood is dominated by microbes that require oxygen, whereas heartwood is dominated by microbes that don't. Much of the methane produced by a tree originates from the heartwood, the study found."

== Phyllosphere microbiome ==
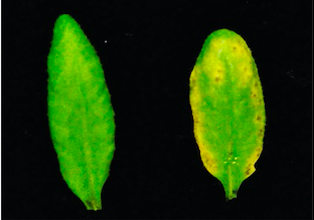
A leaf from a healthy Arabidopsis plant (left) and a leaf from a dysbiosis mutant plant (right)

The aerial surface of a plant (stem, leaf, flower, fruit) is called the phyllosphere and is considered comparatively nutrient poor when compared to the rhizosphere and endosphere. The environment in the phyllosphere is more dynamic than the rhizosphere and endosphere environments. Microbial colonizers are subjected to diurnal and seasonal fluctuations of heat, moisture, and radiation. In addition, these environmental elements affect plant physiology (such as photosynthesis, respiration, water uptake etc.) and indirectly influence microbiome composition. Rain and wind also cause temporal variation to the phyllosphere microbiome.

Interactions between plants and their associated microorganisms in many of these microbiomes can play pivotal roles in host plant health, function, and evolution. The leaf surface, or phyllosphere, harbours a microbiome comprising diverse communities of bacteria, fungi, algae, archaea, and viruses. Interactions between the host plant and phyllosphere bacteria have the potential to drive various aspects of host plant physiology. However, as of 2020 knowledge of these bacterial associations in the phyllosphere remains relatively modest, and there is a need to advance fundamental knowledge of phyllosphere microbiome dynamics.

Overall, there remains high species richness in phyllosphere communities. Fungal communities are highly variable in the phyllosphere of temperate regions and are more diverse than in tropical regions. There can be up to 107 microbes per square centimetre present on the leaf surfaces of plants, and the bacterial population of the phyllosphere on a global scale is estimated to be 10^{26} cells. The population size of the fungal phyllosphere is likely to be smaller.

Phyllosphere microbes from different plants appear to be somewhat similar at high levels of taxa, but at the lower levels taxa there remain significant differences. This indicates microorganisms may need finely tuned metabolic adjustment to survive in phyllosphere environment. Pseudomonadota seems to be the dominant colonizers, with Bacteroidota and Actinomycetota also predominant in phyllospheres. Although there are similarities between the rhizosphere and soil microbial communities, very little similarity has been found between phyllosphere communities and microorganisms floating in open air (aeroplankton).

The assembly of the phyllosphere microbiome, which can be strictly defined as epiphytic bacterial communities on the leaf surface, can be shaped by the microbial communities present in the surrounding environment (i.e., stochastic colonisation) and the host plant (i.e., biotic selection). However, although the leaf surface is generally considered a discrete microbial habitat, there is no consensus on the dominant driver of community assembly across phyllosphere microbiomes. For example, host-specific bacterial communities have been reported in the phyllosphere of co-occurring plant species, suggesting a dominant role of host selection.

Conversely, microbiomes of the surrounding environment have also been reported to be the primary determinant of phyllosphere community composition. As a result, the processes that drive phyllosphere community assembly are not well understood but unlikely to be universal across plant species. However, the existing evidence does indicate that phyllosphere microbiomes exhibiting host-specific associations are more likely to interact with the host than those primarily recruited from the surrounding environment.

The search for a core microbiome in host-associated microbial communities is a useful first step in trying to understand the interactions that may be occurring between a host and its microbiome. The prevailing core microbiome concept is built on the notion that the persistence of a taxon across the spatiotemporal boundaries of an ecological niche is directly reflective of its functional importance within the niche it occupies; it therefore provides a framework for identifying functionally critical microorganisms that consistently associate with a host species.

Divergent definitions of "core microbiome" have arisen across scientific literature with researchers variably identifying "core taxa" as those persistent across distinct host microhabitats and even different species. Given the functional divergence of microorganisms across different host species and microhabitats, defining core taxa sensu stricto as those persistent across broad geographic distances within tissue- and species-specific host microbiomes, represents the most biologically and ecologically appropriate application of this conceptual framework. Tissue- and species-specific core microbiomes across host populations separated by broad geographical distances have not been widely reported for the phyllosphere using the stringent definition established by Ruinen.

=== Example: The mānuka phyllosphere ===
The flowering tea tree commonly known as mānuka is indigenous to New Zealand. Mānuka honey, produced from the nectar of mānuka flowers, is known for its non-peroxide antibacterial properties. Microorganisms have been studied in the mānuka rhizosphere and endosphere. Earlier studies primarily focussed on fungi, and a 2016 study provided the first investigation of endophytic bacterial communities from three geographically and environmentally distinct mānuka populations using fingerprinting techniques and revealed tissue-specific core endomicrobiomes.

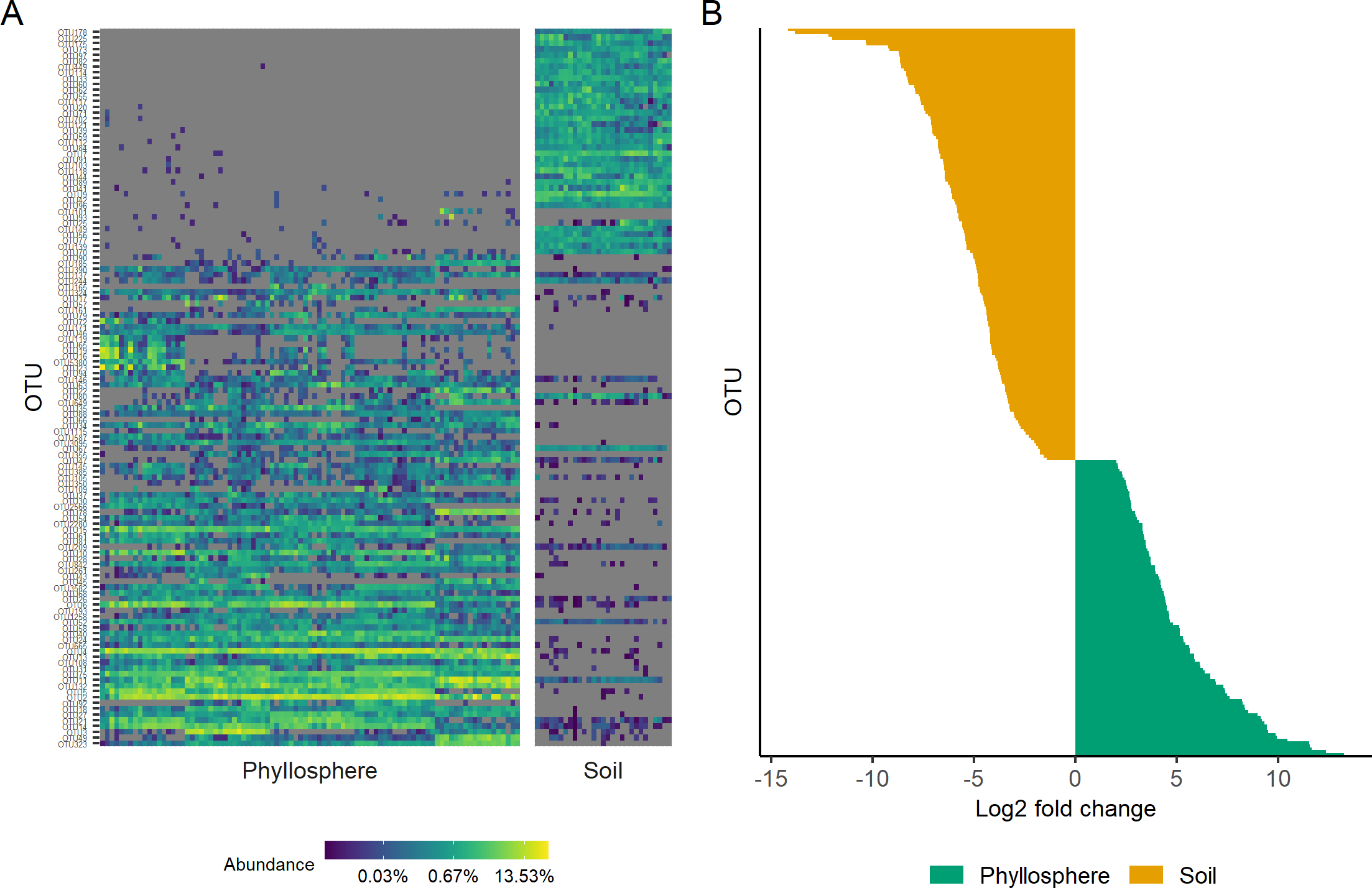
{A} The heatmap on the left illustrates how the composition of OTUs in the mānuka phyllosphere and associated soil communities differed significantly. No core soil microbiome was detected. (B) The chart on the right shows how OTUs in phyllosphere and associated soil communities differed in relative abundances.

A 2020 study identified a habitat-specific and relatively abundant core microbiome in the mānuka phyllosphere, which was persistent across all samples. In contrast, non-core phyllosphere microorganisms exhibited significant variation across individual host trees and populations that was strongly driven by environmental and spatial factors. The results demonstrated the existence of a dominant and ubiquitous core microbiome in the phyllosphere of mānuka.

Relative abundance of core phyllosphere taxa in mānuka
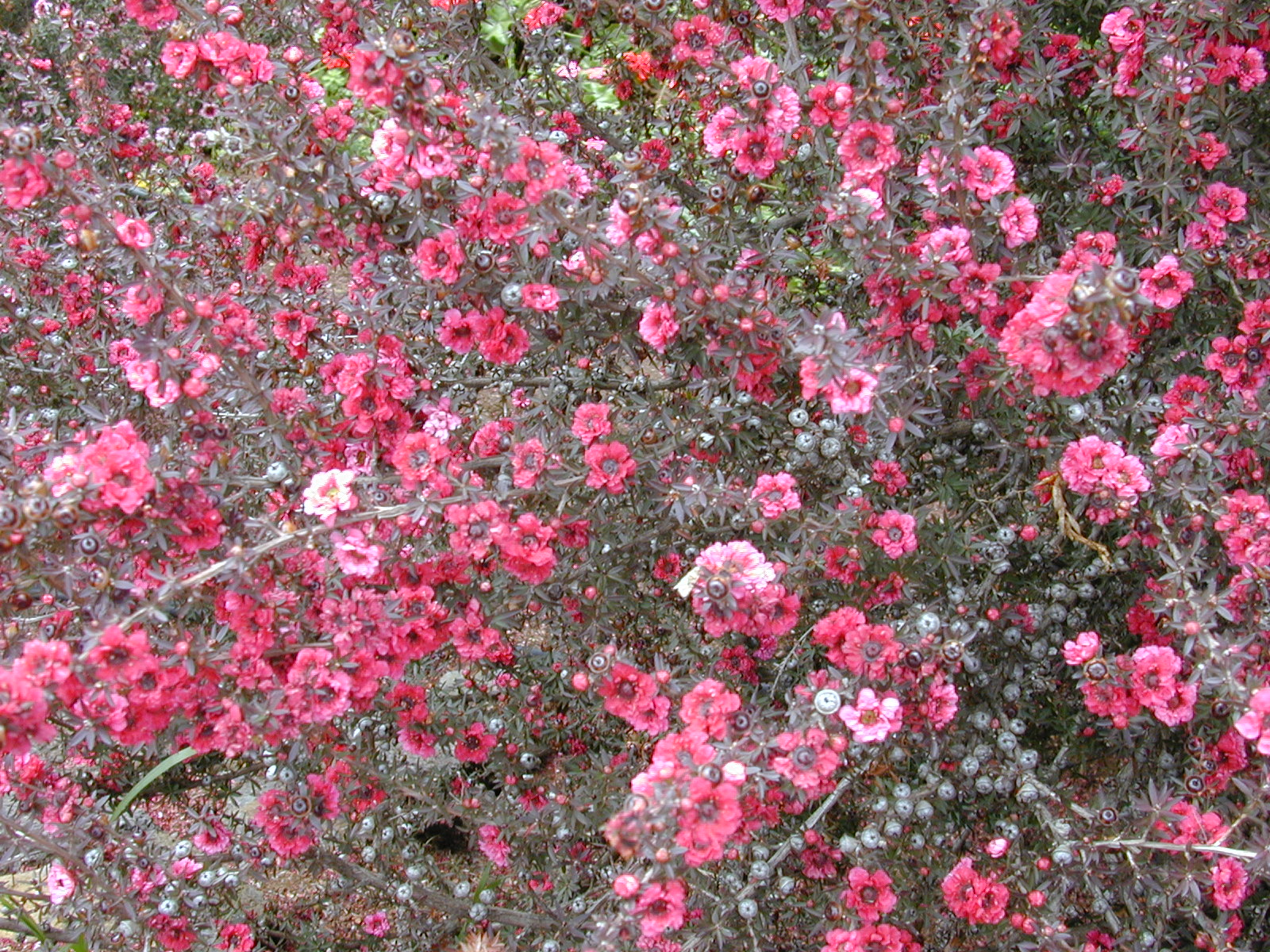
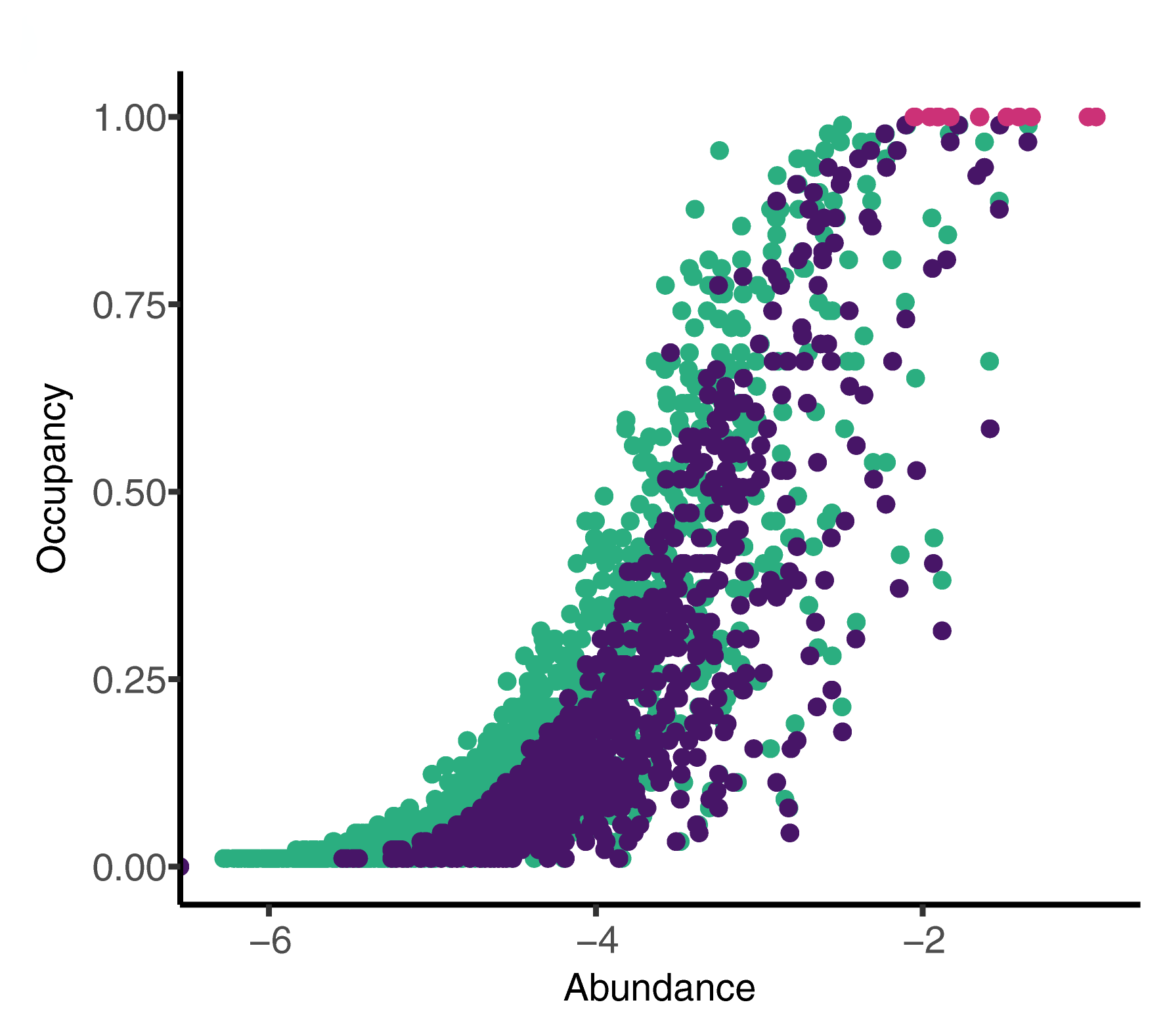
Mānuka is a flowering scrub. The chart shows an abundance-occupancy distribution identifying core phyllosphere taxa in non-rarefied (green) and rarefied (purple) datasets. Each point represents a taxon plotted by its mean logarithmic relative abundance and occupancy. Taxa (pink) with an occupancy of 1 (i.e., detected in all 89 phyllosphere samples) were considered members of the core microbiome.

== Seed microbiome ==
Plant seeds can serve as natural vectors for vertical transmission of their beneficial endophytes, such as those that confer disease resistance. A 2021 research paper explained, "It makes sense that their most important symbionts would be vertically transmitted through seed rather than gambling that all of the correct soil-dwelling microbes might be available at the germination site."

The new paradigm regarding mutualistic fungi and bacterial transmission via the seeds of host plants has been fostered largely by research pertaining to plants of agricultural value. Rice seeds were found to entail high microbial diversity, with the greatest diversity inhabiting the embryo rather than the pericarp. Fungi of genus Fusarium transmitted via seeds were found to be dominant members of the microbiome within the stems of maize. This facet of the plant microbiome came to be known as the seed microbiome.

Forestry researchers have also begun to identify members of the seed microbiome pertaining to valuable tree species. Vertical transmission of fungal and bacterial mutualists was confirmed in 2021 for the acorns of oak trees. If the research on oaks turns out to apply to other tree species, it will be understood that the above-soil portions of a plant (the phyllosphere) obtain nearly all of their beneficial fungi from those carried in the seed. In contrast, the roots (the rhizosphere) acquire only a small fraction of their mutualists from the seed. Most arrive via the surrounding soil, and this includes their vital associations with arbuscular mycorrhizal fungi.

Microbial species consistently found in plant seeds are known as the "core microbiome." Benefits to the host plant include their ability to assist in the production of antimicrobial compounds, detoxification, nutrient uptake, and growth-promoting activities. Discerning the functions of symbiotic microbes in seeds is shifting the agricultural paradigm away from seed breeding and preparation that traditionally sought to minimize the presence of fungal and bacterial propagules. The likelihood that a microbe found within a seed is mutualistic is now a routine presumption. Such partners may contribute to "seed dormancy and germination, environmental adaptation, resistance and tolerance against diseases, and growth promotion."

Application of the new understanding of beneficial microbes inhabiting seeds has been suggested for use beyond agriculture and for biodiversity conservation. A citizen group advocating for northward assisted migration of an endangered tree in the USA has pointed to the seed microbiome paradigm shift as a reason for the official institutions to lift their ban on seed transfer beyond the ex situ conservation plantings in northern Georgia.

== Putting it together ==
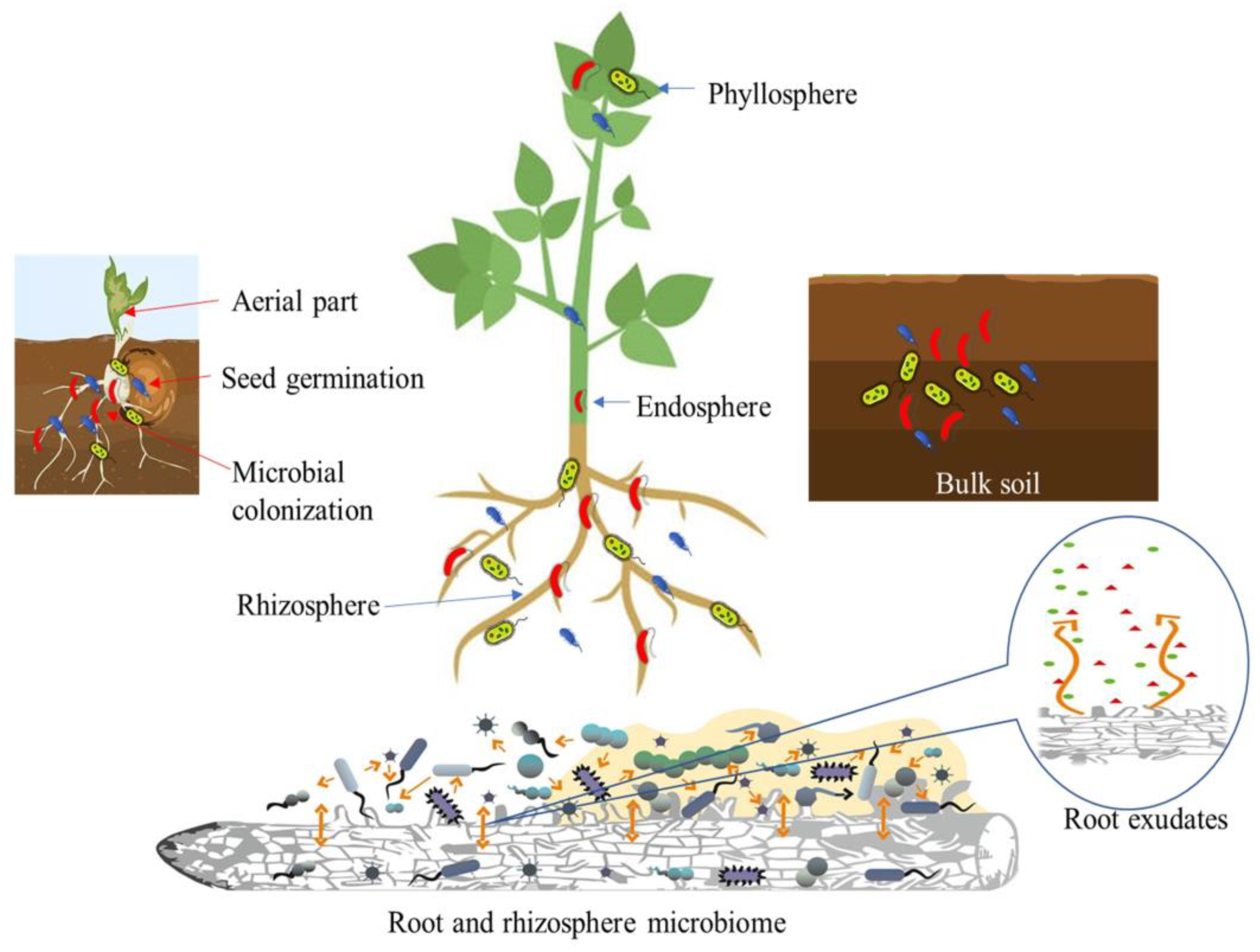
Plant–microbiome interaction Regions involved in the development of a plant microbiome

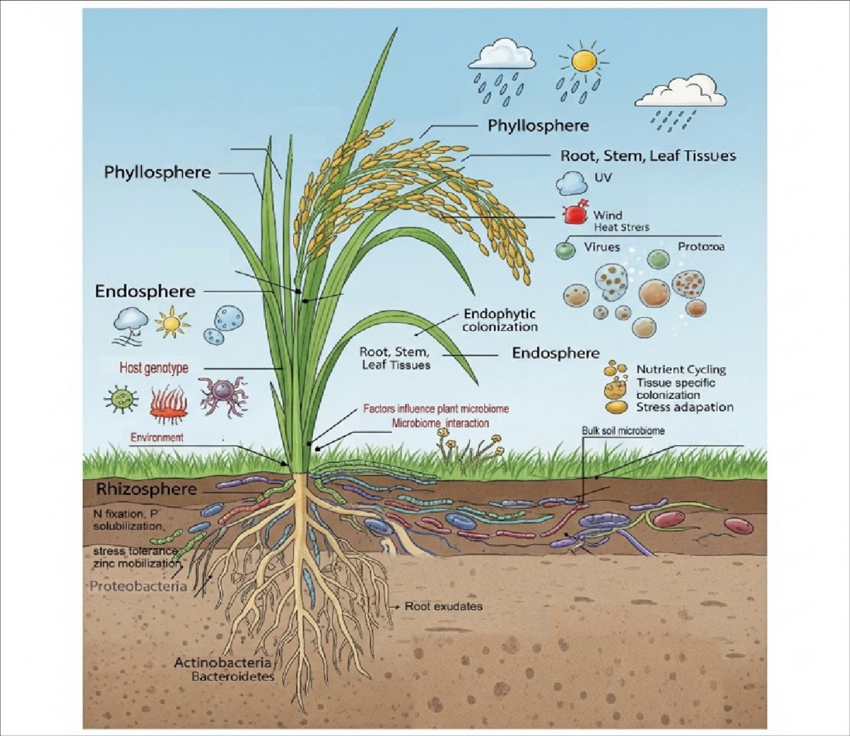
Rice-microbiome interaction at various levels (phylloshphere, rhizosphere and endosphere)

== Plant holobiont ==
Since the colonization of land by ancestral plant lineages 450 million years ago, plants and their associated microbes have been interacting with each other, forming an assemblage of species that is often referred to as a holobiont. Selective pressure acting on holobiont components has likely shaped plant-associated microbial communities and selected for host-adapted microorganisms that impact plant fitness. However, the high microbial densities detected on plant tissues, together with the fast generation time of microbes and their more ancient origin compared to their host, suggest that microbe-microbe interactions are also important selective forces sculpting complex microbial assemblages in the phyllosphere, rhizosphere, and plant endosphere compartments.

== See also ==
- Biomass partitioning
- Mangrove microbiome
- Phytobiome

== Reference books ==
- Saleem M (2015) Microbiome Community Ecology: Fundamentals and Applications Springer. ISBN 9783319116655.
- Kumar V, Prasad R, Kumar M and Choudhary DK (2019) Microbiome in Plant Health and Disease: Challenges and Opportunities Springer. ISBN 9789811384950.
- Kumar, Vivek; Prasad, Ram; Kumar, Manoj; Choudhary, Devendra K. (10 August 2019). Microbiome in Plant Health and Disease: Challenges and Opportunities. Springer. ISBN 978-981-13-8495-0.
- Grube, Martin; Schloter, Michael; Smalla, Kornelia; Berg, Gabriele (22 January 2015). The plant microbiome and its importance for plant and human health. Vol. 5. p. 491. doi:10.3389/fmicb.2014.00491. ISBN 978-2-88919-378-3. PMC 4166366. PMID 25278934.
- Egamberdieva, Dilfuza; Ahmad, Parvaiz (6 February 2018). Plant Microbiome: Stress Response. Springer. ISBN 978-981-10-5514-0.
- Castiglione, Stefano; Cicatelli, Angela; Ferrol, Nuria; Rozpadek, Piotr (22 August 2019). Effects of Plant-Microbiome Interactions on Phyto- and Bio-Remediation Capacity. Frontiers Media SA. ISBN 978-2-88945-932-2.
- Castiglione, Stefano; Cicatelli, Angela; Ferrol, Nuria; Rozpadek, Piotr (22 August 2019). Effects of Plant-Microbiome Interactions on Phyto- and Bio-Remediation Capacity. Frontiers Media SA. ISBN 978-2-88945-932-2.
- Carvalhais, Lilia C.; Dennis, Paul G. (30 December 2020). The Plant Microbiome: Methods and Protocols. Springer. ISBN 978-1-0716-1039-8.
- Kumar, Vivek; Prasad, Ram; Kumar, Manoj; Choudhary, Devendra K. (10 August 2019). Microbiome in Plant Health and Disease: Challenges and Opportunities. Springer. ISBN 978-981-13-8495-0.
- Solanki, Manoj Kumar; Kashyap, Prem Lal; Ansari, Rizwan Ali; Kumari, Baby (28 August 2020). Microbiomes and Plant Health: Panoply and Their Applications. Academic Press. ISBN 978-0-12-822601-8.
- Yadav, Ajar (2020). Advances in plant microbiome and sustainable agriculture functional annotation and future challenges. Singapore: Springer. ISBN 978-981-15-3204-7. OCLC 1193118045.
- Varma, Ajit (28 August 2020). Plant Microbiome Paradigm. Springer. ISBN 978-3-030-50395-6.
- Doty, Sharon Lafferty (21 September 2017). Functional Importance of the Plant Microbiome: Implications for Agriculture, Forestry and Bioenergy. Springer. ISBN 978-3-319-65897-1.
- Antwis, Rachael E.; Harrison, Xavier A.; Cox, Michael J. (12 March 2020). Microbiomes of Soils, Plants and Animals: An Integrated Approach. Cambridge University Press. ISBN 978-1-108-47371-2.
- Varma, Ajit; Tripathi, Swati; Prasad, Ram (20 October 2020). Plant Microbiome Paradigm. Springer. ISBN 978-3-030-50394-9.
- Rosenberg, Eugene; Zilber-Rosenberg, Ilana (31 January 2014). The Hologenome Concept: Human, Animal and Plant Microbiota. Springer. ISBN 978-3-319-04241-1.
- Yadav, Ajar Nath; Singh, Joginder; Rastegari, Ali Asghar; Yadav, Neelam (6 March 2020). Plant Microbiomes for Sustainable Agriculture. Springer. ISBN 978-3-030-38453-1.
