= Endosphere =

Internal plant microbiome

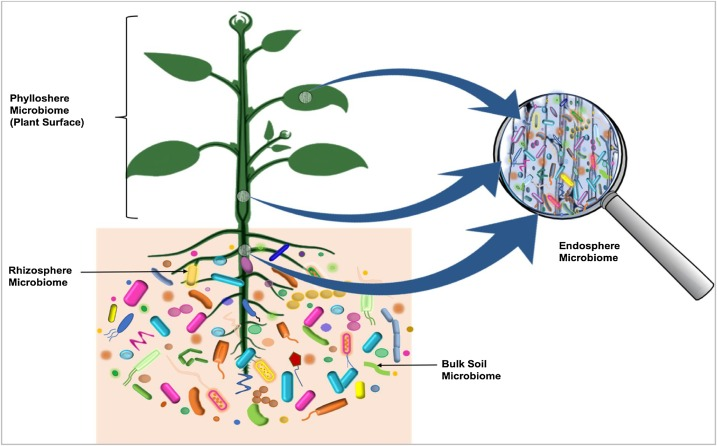
The endosphere microbiome The plant microbiome consists of diverse microbial communities on the outside surface and in internal tissues of the host plant. The rhizosphere and phyllosphere communities are on the outside of the plant, while the endosphere community is inside the plant.

Some microorganisms, such as endophytes, penetrate and occupy the plant internal tissues, forming the endospheric microbiome. The arbuscular mycorrhizal and other endophytic fungi are the dominant colonizers of the endosphere. Bacteria, and to some degree archaea, are important members of endosphere communities. Some of these endophytic microbes interact with their host and provide obvious benefits to plants. Unlike the rhizosphere and the rhizoplane, the endospheres harbor highly specific microbial communities. The root endophytic community can be very distinct from that of the adjacent soil community. In general, diversity of the endophytic community is lower than the diversity of the microbial community outside the plant. The identity and diversity of the endophytic microbiome of above-and below-ground tissues may also differ within the plant.

== Leaves and bacteria ==
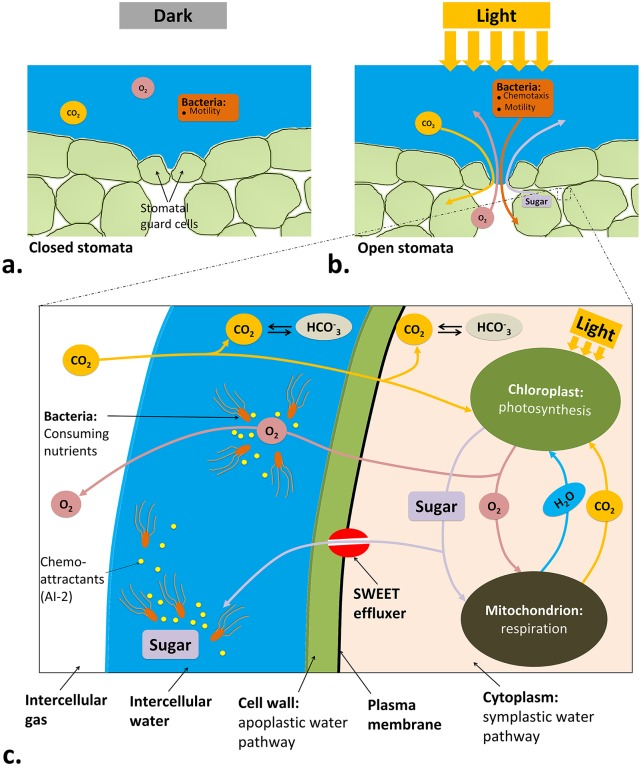
Light-induced infiltration of bacterial into a leaf Physical schematic focusing on a stomatal opening under a) dark conditions b) light conditions c) Closeup of underlying pathways within a leaf tissue that result in light-induced bacterial infiltration into the leaf

Exposure to light can trigger photosynthesis in plant leaves, such as leafy-greens, and increase concentrations of photosynthetic products, such as glucose, within the leaf tissue. Bacteria existing at the leaf surfaces may respond to the available photosynthetic products and migrate into the leaf tissue by chemotaxis toward nutrient concentration gradients. Once the bacteria are inside the leaf tissue, they cannot be washed away, presenting a risk to consumers. Several bacteria, such as Escherichia coli and Salmonella enterica, are able to attach the microstructure at the surface of plant leaves, such as trichomes, stomata and grooves, and localize at sites that are not accessible for wash water and sanitizers. The bacteria are also able to infiltrate into available openings at the leaf surface, such as stomata, cuts and wounds, to reach tens of micrometer depths below the leaf epidermis. This infiltration can present a risk to human consumption of raw leafy greens.

Light is one of the driving forces that can promote infiltration of pathogenic bacteria into plant leaves. Incubation of S. enterica (serovar Typhimurium) on iceberg lettuce leaves in the light led to association of bacteria near open stomata and infiltration into the leaf tissue. However, a dark condition caused a scattered attachment pattern at the leaf surface and poor stomatal infiltration. Nutrients, such as glucose and sucrose, produced by photosynthetically active cells in the leaf tissue during light exposure are attractive for bacteria that may be initially present at the leaf surface. Opening of the stomata in light brings up an opportunity for bacteria to transport via chemotaxis toward the gradients of nutrients into the leaf interior. Many plants have evolved stomatal defense machinery to close the stomata upon perception of bacterial surface structures, known as microbe-associated molecular patterns (MAMPs). However, it is not always successful and some human pathogens were shown to penetrate the leaf interior through a process involved in chemotaxis and motility.
