= Phyllosphere =

Plant surfaces as habitats for microorganisms

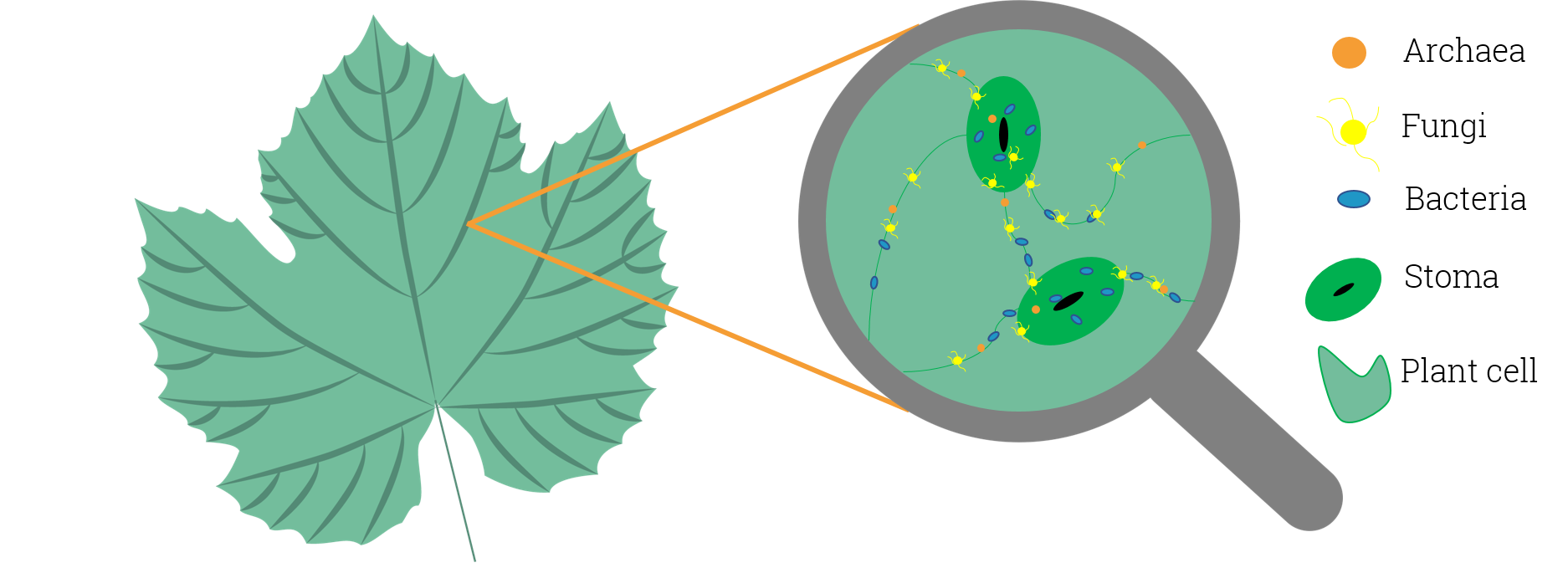
The plant aerial surface, mostly occupied by leaves, is inhabited by diverse microorganisms, forming the phyllosphere

In microbiology, the phyllosphere is the total above-ground surface of a plant when viewed as a habitat for microorganisms. The phyllosphere can be further subdivided into the caulosphere (stems), phylloplane (leaves), anthosphere (flowers), and carposphere (fruits). The below-ground microbial habitats (i.e. the thin-volume of soil surrounding root or subterranean stem surfaces) are referred to as the rhizosphere and laimosphere. Most plants host diverse communities of microorganisms including bacteria, fungi, archaea, and protists. Some are beneficial to the plant, while others function as plant pathogens and may damage the host plant or even kill it.

== The phyllosphere microbiome ==
The leaf surface, or phyllosphere, harbours a microbiome comprising diverse communities of bacteria, archaea, fungi, algae and viruses. Microbial colonizers are subjected to diurnal and seasonal fluctuations of heat, moisture, and radiation. In addition, these environmental elements affect plant physiology (such as photosynthesis, respiration, water uptake etc.) and indirectly influence microbiome composition. Rain and wind also cause temporal variations in the phyllosphere microbiome.

The phyllosphere includes the total aerial (above-ground) surface of a plant, and as such includes the surface of the stem, flowers and fruit, but most particularly the leaf surfaces. Compared with the rhizosphere and the endosphere the phyllosphere is nutrient poor and its environment more dynamic.

Interactions between plants and their associated microorganisms in many of these microbiomes can play pivotal roles in host plant health, function, and evolution. Interactions between the host plant and phyllosphere bacteria have the potential to drive various aspects of host plant physiology. However, as of 2020 knowledge of these bacterial associations in the phyllosphere remains relatively modest, and there is a need to advance fundamental knowledge of phyllosphere microbiome dynamics.

The assembly of the phyllosphere microbiome, which can be strictly defined as epiphytic bacterial communities on the leaf surface, can be shaped by the microbial communities present in the surrounding environment (i.e., stochastic colonisation) and the host plant (i.e., biotic selection). However, although the leaf surface is generally considered a discrete microbial habitat, there is no consensus on the dominant driver of community assembly across phyllosphere microbiomes. For example, host-specific bacterial communities have been reported in the phyllosphere of co-occurring plant species, suggesting a dominant role of host selection.

Conversely, microbiomes of the surrounding environment have also been reported to be the primary determinant of phyllosphere community composition. As a result, the processes that drive phyllosphere community assembly are not well understood but unlikely to be universal across plant species. However, the existing evidence does indicate that phyllosphere microbiomes exhibiting host-specific associations are more likely to interact with the host than those primarily recruited from the surrounding environment.

Spatial scales matter

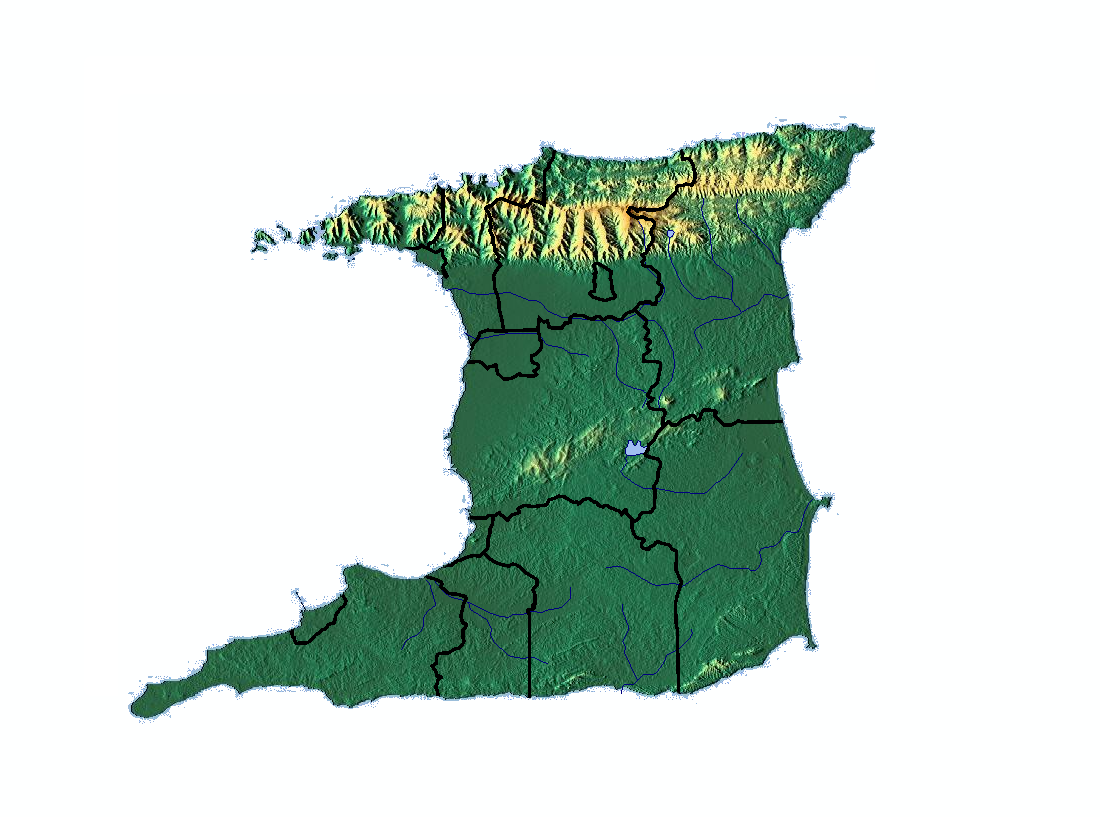
Trinidad

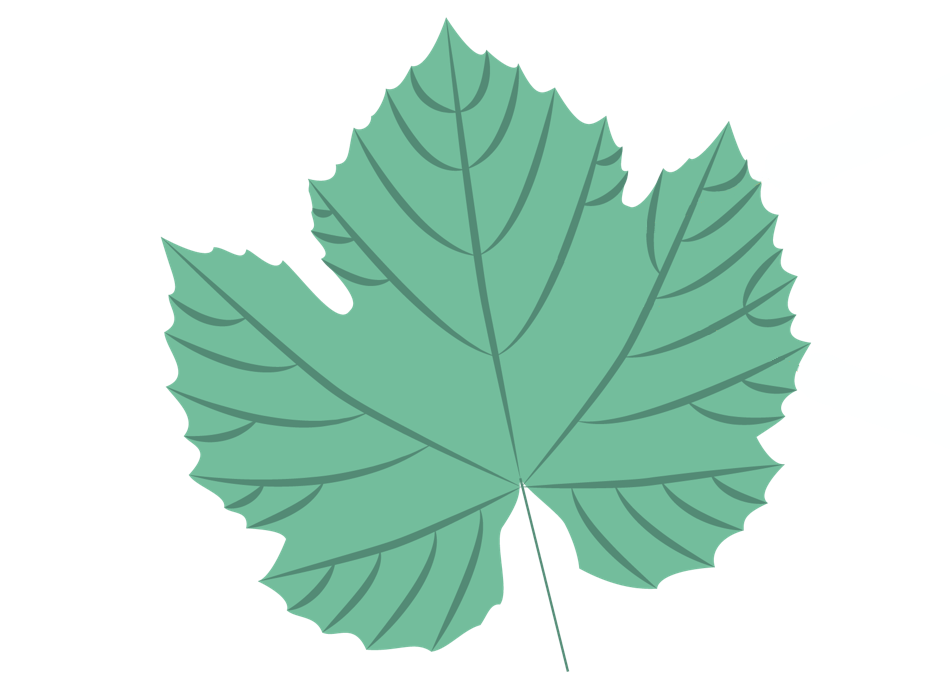
A leaf

The area of Trinidad is about 5000 sq km (2000 sq mi). Compared to the size of a human, this is about the same relative area as a typical leaf compared to the size of a bacterium. Imagine a human somewhere on Trinidad without legs to move, and neither eyes to see nor ears to hear, retaining only the ability to smell and touch. This is a parallel to how an individual bacterium perceives a leaf. There is no ability to perceive anything beyond its most immediate surroundings. Bacteria need water for movement and they perceive only "signals, such as sugars, amino acids or volatiles, diffusing to their occupied site". This microhabitat determines the experience of the individual bacterium and how it responds.

Overall, there remains high species richness in phyllosphere communities. Fungal communities are highly variable in the phyllosphere of temperate regions and are more diverse than in tropical regions. There can be up to 10^{7} microbes per square centimetre present on the leaf surfaces of plants, and the bacterial population of the phyllosphere on a global scale is estimated to be 10^{26} cells. The population size of the fungal phyllosphere is likely to be smaller.

Phyllosphere microbes from different plants appear to be somewhat similar at high levels of taxa, but at the lower levels taxa there remain significant differences. This indicates microorganisms may need finely tuned metabolic adjustment to survive in the phyllosphere environment. Pseudomonadota seems to be the dominant colonizers, with Bacteroidota and Actinomycetota also predominant in phyllospheres. Although there are similarities between the rhizosphere and soil microbial communities, very little similarity has been found between phyllosphere communities and microorganisms floating in open air (aeroplankton).

The search for a core microbiome in host-associated microbial communities is a useful first step in trying to understand the interactions that may be occurring between a host and its microbiome. The prevailing core microbiome concept is built on the notion that the persistence of a taxon across the spatiotemporal boundaries of an ecological niche is directly reflective of its functional importance within the niche it occupies; it therefore provides a framework for identifying functionally critical microorganisms that consistently associate with a host species.

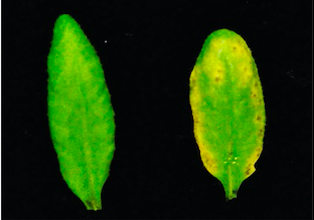
A leaf from a healthy Arabidopsis plant (left) and a leaf from a dysbiosis mutant plant (right)

Divergent definitions of "core microbiome" have arisen across scientific literature with researchers variably identifying "core taxa" as those persistent across distinct host microhabitats and even different species. Given the functional divergence of microorganisms across different host species and microhabitats, defining core taxa sensu stricto as those persistent across broad geographic distances within tissue- and species-specific host microbiomes, represents the most biologically and ecologically appropriate application of this conceptual framework. Tissue- and species-specific core microbiomes across host populations separated by broad geographical distances have not been widely reported for the phyllosphere using the stringent definition established by Ruinen.

== Example: The manuka phyllosphere ==
Relative abundance of core phyllosphere taxa in manuka
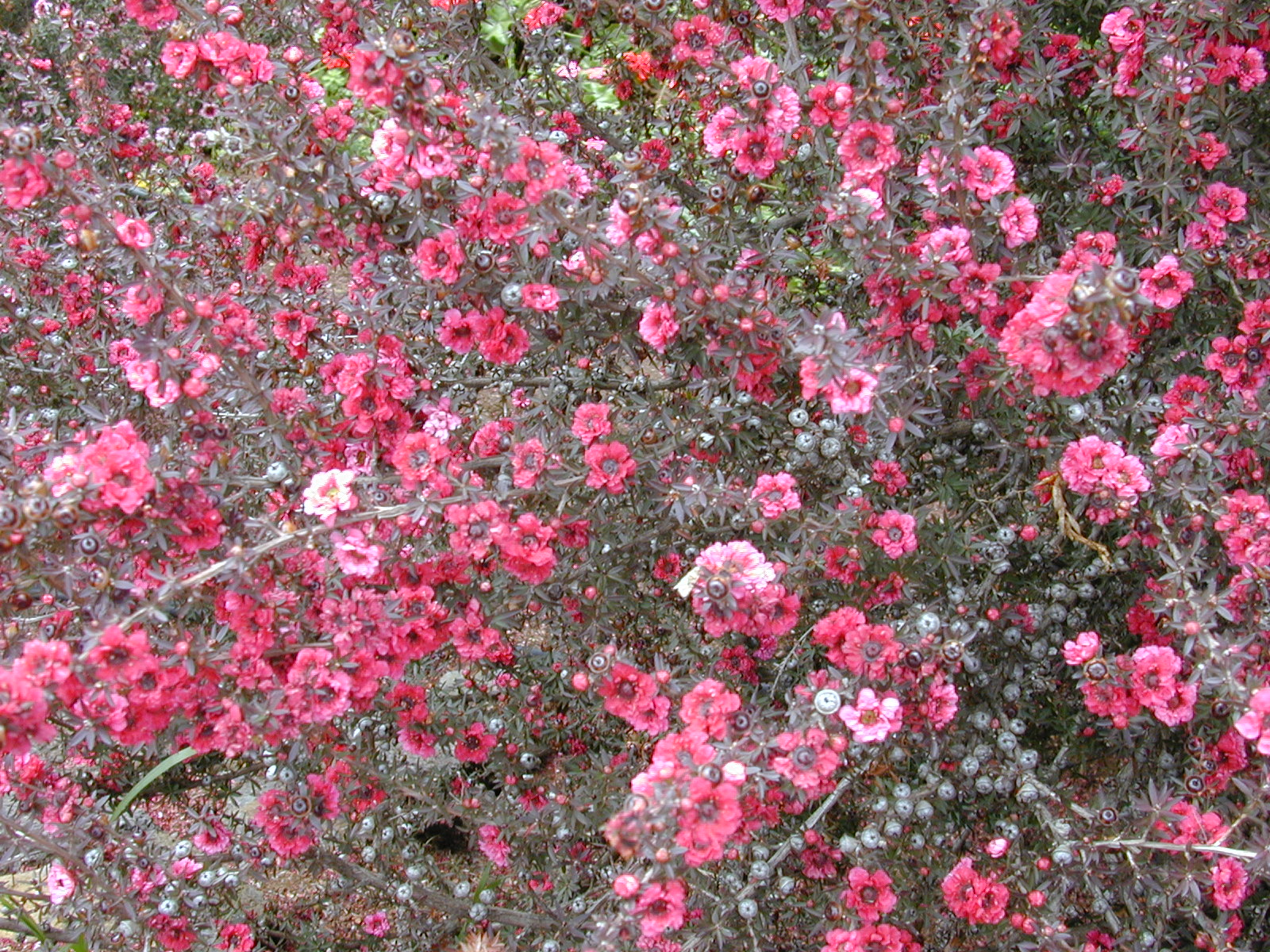
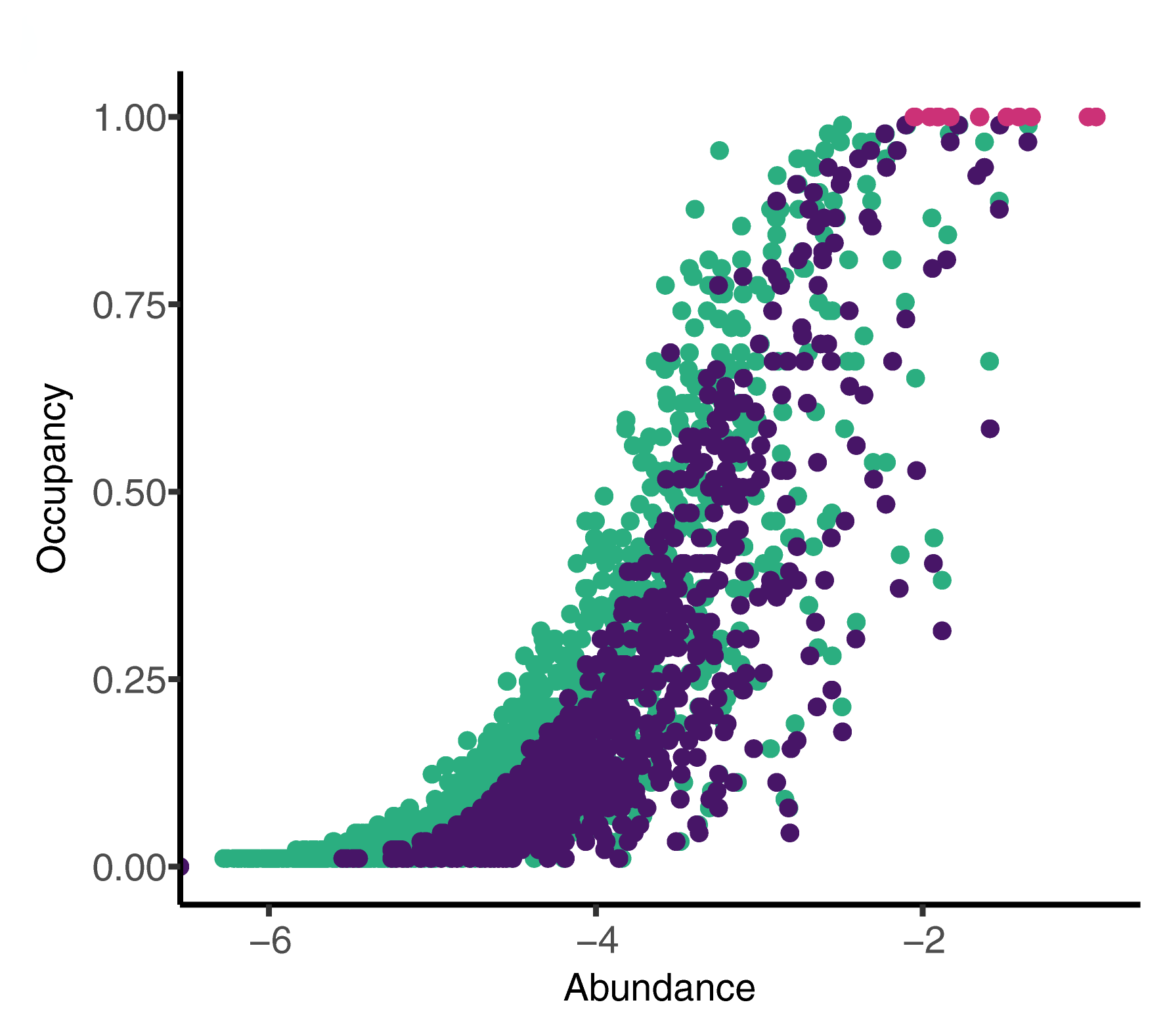
Manuka is a flowering scrub. The chart shows an abundance-occupancy distribution identifying core phyllosphere taxa in non-rarefied (green) and rarefied (purple) datasets. Each point represents a taxon plotted by its mean logarithmic relative abundance and occupancy. Taxa (pink) with an occupancy of 1 (i.e., detected in all 89 phyllosphere samples) were considered members of the core microbiome.

The flowering tea tree commonly known as manuka is indigenous to New Zealand. Manuka honey, produced from the nectar of manuka flowers, is known for its non-peroxide antibacterial properties. These non-peroxide antibacterial properties have been principally linked to the accumulation of the three-carbon sugar dihydroxyacetone (DHA) in the nectar of the manuka flower, which undergoes a chemical conversion to methylglyoxal (MGO) in mature honey. However, the concentration of DHA in the nectar of manuka flowers is notoriously variable, and the antimicrobial efficacy of manuka honey consequently varies from region to region and from year to year. Despite extensive research efforts, no reliable correlation has been identified between DHA production and climatic, edaphic, or host genetic factors.

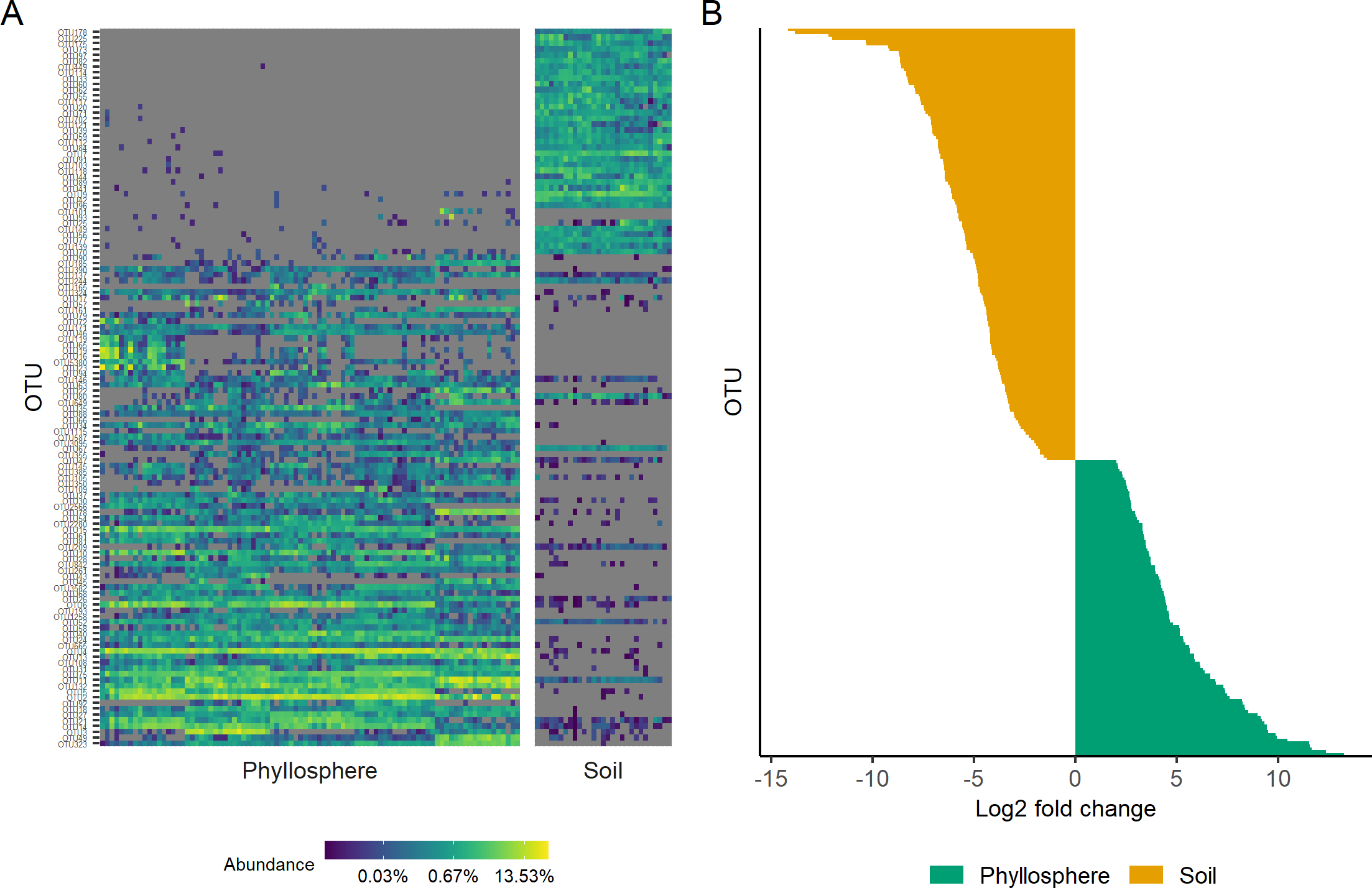
{A} The heatmap on the left illustrates how the composition of operational taxonomic units (OTUs) in the manuka phyllosphere and associated soil communities differed significantly. No core soil microbiome was detected. (B) The chart on the right shows how OTUs in phyllosphere and associated soil communities differed in relative abundances.

Microorganisms have been studied in the manuka rhizosphere and endosphere. Earlier studies primarily focussed on fungi, and a 2016 study provided the first investigation of endophytic bacterial communities from three geographically and environmentally distinct manuka populations using fingerprinting techniques and revealed tissue-specific core endomicrobiomes. A 2020 study identified a habitat-specific and relatively abundant core microbiome in the manuka phyllosphere, which was persistent across all samples. In contrast, non-core phyllosphere microorganisms exhibited significant variation across individual host trees and populations that was strongly driven by environmental and spatial factors. The results demonstrated the existence of a dominant and ubiquitous core microbiome in the phyllosphere of manuka.

== See also ==
- Epibiont
- Epiphytes
- Foliicolous
- Microbiota
- Epiphytic fungus
- Epiphytic bacteria
