= Epiphytic bacteria =

Epiphytic bacteria are bacteria which live non-parasitically on the surface of a plant on various organs such as the leaves, roots, flowers, buds, seeds and fruit. In current studies it has been determined that epiphytic bacteria generally don't harm the plant, but promote the formation of ice crystals. Some produce an auxin hormone which promotes plant growth and plays a role in the life cycle of the bacteria.

Different bacteria prefer different plants and different plant organs depending on the organ's nutritional content, and depending on the bacteria's colonization system which is controlled by the host plant. Bacteria which live on leaves are referred to as phyllobacteria, and bacteria which live on the root system are referred to as rhizobacteria. They adhere to the plant surface as 1-cluster 2- individual bacterial cells 3- biofilm. The age of the organ also affects the epiphytic bacteria population and characteristics and has a role in the inhibition of phytopathogen on plant. Epiphytic bacteria found in the marine environment have a role in the nitrogen cycle.

== Species ==
There are diverse species of epiphytic bacteria. An incomplete list:

- Citrobacter youngae
- Bacillus thuringiensis
- Enterobacter soli
- Bacillus tequilensis
- Bacillus aryabhattai
- Pantoea eucalypti
- Pseudomonas palleroniana
- Serratia nematodiphila
- Stenotrophomonas maltophilia
- Pseudomonas mosselii
- Pseudomonas putida
- Lysinibacillus xylanilyticus
- Enterobacter asburiae
- Acinetobacter johnsonii
- Pseudomonas macerans
- Serratia marcescens

== Classification ==
Many epiphytic bacteria are rod-shaped, and classified as either gram negative or gram positive, pigmented or non-pigmented, fermentative or non-fermentative.

Non-pigmented epiphytic bacteria have high a GC content in their genome, a characteristic which protects the bacteria from the ultraviolet rays of the sun. Because of this, these bacteria have special nutritional requirements. Current studies on epiphytic bacteria are underway for biotechnological applications such as the promotion of plant growth. Epiphytic bacteria are removed from the plant surface through ultraviolet radiation, chemical surface disinfection, and washing.

== See also ==
- Epiliths, organisms that grow on rocks
- Zoochory, seed dispersal by animals
- Epibiont, an organism that grows on another life form
- Foliicolous, lichens or bryophytes that grow on leaves
- Epiphyte
- Endosymbiont
- Epiphytic fungus
