= D-4-hydroxyphenylglycine transaminase =

Identifiers
- EC no.: 2.6.1.72
- CAS no.: 117444-05-0

Databases
- BRENDA: enzyme data
- ExPASy: NiceZyme view
- KEGG: enzyme entry
- MetaCyc: metabolic pathway
- Rhea: reactions
- PDB structures: RCSB PDB PDBe PDBsum
- Gene Ontology: AmiGO / QuickGO
Search
- PMC: articles
- PubMed: articles
- NCBI: proteins

D-4-hydroxyphenylglycine transaminase (EC 2.6.1.72) is a pyridoxal phosphate-dependent enzyme that catalyzes the chemical reaction

D-4-hydroxyphenylglycine
+
α-ketoglutaric acid
4-hydroxyphenylglyoxylic acid
+
L-glutamic acid

The two substrates of this enzyme characterised from Pseudomonas putida are D-4-hydroxyphenylglycine and α-ketoglutaric acid. Its products are 4-hydroxyphenylglyoxylic acid and L-glutamic acid.

This enzyme is a transferase, specifically a transaminase, which transfer nitrogenous groups. The systematic name of this enzyme class is D-4-hydroxyphenylglycine:2-oxoglutarate aminotransferase. This enzyme is also called D-hydroxyphenylglycine aminotransferase.
