= N-formylglutamate deformylase =

Class of enzymes

Identifiers
- EC no.: 3.5.1.68
- CAS no.: 97286-12-9

Databases
- BRENDA: enzyme data
- ExPASy: NiceZyme view
- KEGG: enzyme entry
- MetaCyc: metabolic pathway
- Rhea: reactions
- PDB structures: RCSB PDB PDBe PDBsum
- Gene Ontology: AmiGO / QuickGO
Search
- PMC: articles
- PubMed: articles
- NCBI: proteins

N-formylglutamate deformylase (EC 3.5.1.68) is an enzyme characterised from rats and Pseudomonas putida which catalyzes the hydrolysis of N-formyl-L-glutamic acid to L-glutamic acid and formic acid:

N-formyl-L-glutamic acid
H_{2}O
L-glutamic acid
+ HCO_{2}H

The reaction is part of the catabolism of histidine, and the enzyme has been located in the genome of Pseudomonas putida.

This enzyme is a hydrolase, one acting on carbon-nitrogen bonds other than peptide bonds, specifically in linear amides. The systematic name of this enzyme class is N-formyl-L-glutamate amidohydrolase. Other names in common use include beta-citryl-L-glutamate hydrolase, formylglutamate deformylase, N-formylglutamate hydrolase, beta-citrylglutamate amidase, beta-citryl-L-glutamate amidohydrolase, beta-citryl-L-glutamate amidase, beta-citrylglutamate amidase, and beta-citryl-L-glutamate-hydrolyzing enzyme.
