= N-methylhydantoinase (ATP-hydrolysing) =

Class of enzymes

N-methylhydantoinase (ATP-hydrolyzing)

Identifiers
- EC no.: 3.5.2.14
- CAS no.: 100785-00-0

Databases
- BRENDA: enzyme data
- ExPASy: NiceZyme view
- KEGG: enzyme entry
- MetaCyc: metabolic pathway
- Rhea: reactions
- PDB structures: RCSB PDB PDBe PDBsum
- Gene Ontology: AmiGO / QuickGO
Search
- PMC: articles
- PubMed: articles
- NCBI: proteins

N-methylhydantoinase (ATP-hydrolysing) (EC 3.5.2.14) is an enzyme characterised fro Pseudomonas putida that catalyzes the hydrolysis of 1-methylhydantoin to 3-methylhydantoic acid (N-carbamoylsarcosine):

1-methylhydantoin
H_{2}O
H_{2}O
3-methylhydantoic acid

The enzyme uses adenosine triphosphate to drive the reversible reaction towards 3-methylhydantoic acid: its byproducts are adenosine diphosphate and orthophosphate. The reaction is part of the creatinine degradation pathway.

This enzyme is a hydrolase, one acting on carbon-nitrogen bonds other than peptide bonds, specifically in cyclic amides. The systematic name of this enzyme class is N-methylimidazolidine-2,4-dione amidohydrolase (ATP-hydrolysing). Other names in common use include N-methylhydantoin amidohydrolase, methylhydantoin amidase, N-methylhydantoin hydrolase, and N-methylhydantoinase.
