= 5-Exo-hydroxycamphor dehydrogenase =

Class of enzymes

5-exo-hydroxycamphor dehydrogenase

Identifiers
- EC no.: 1.1.1.327

Databases
- IntEnz: IntEnz view
- BRENDA: BRENDA entry
- ExPASy: NiceZyme view
- KEGG: KEGG entry
- MetaCyc: metabolic pathway
- PRIAM: profile
- PDB structures: RCSB PDB PDBe PDBsum
Search
- PMC: articles
- PubMed: articles
- NCBI: proteins

5-exo-hydroxycamphor dehydrogenase (EC 1.1.1.327, F-dehydrogenase, FdeH) is an enzyme with systematic name 5-exo-hydroxycamphor:NAD^{+} oxidoreductase. This enzyme catalyses the following chemical reaction

5-exo-hydroxycamphor + NAD^{+} $\rightleftharpoons$ bornane-2,5-dione + NADH + H^{+}

This enzyme contains Zn^{2+}. It is isolated from Pseudomonas putida.
