= Malonate CoA-transferase =

Class of enzymes

Identifiers
- EC no.: 2.8.3.3
- CAS no.: 9026-18-0

Databases
- BRENDA: enzyme data
- ExPASy: NiceZyme view
- KEGG: enzyme entry
- MetaCyc: metabolic pathway
- Rhea: reactions
- PDB structures: RCSB PDB PDBe PDBsum
- Gene Ontology: AmiGO / QuickGO
Search
- PMC: articles
- PubMed: articles
- NCBI: proteins

Malonate CoA-transferase (EC 2.8.3.3) is an enzyme that catalyzes the chemical reaction

malonic acid
+
acetyl-CoA
malonyl-CoA
+
acetic acid

The two substrates of this enzyme characterised from Pseudomonas ovalis are malonic acid and acetyl-CoA. Its products are malonyl-CoA and acetic acid. The reaction is the first step in the decarboxylation of malonic acid. In Pseudomonas putida, this decarboxylation involves a multi-enzyme complex.

This enzyme is a transferase, specifically a CoA-transferase. The systematic name of this enzyme class is acetyl-CoA:malonate CoA-transferase. This enzyme is also called malonate coenzyme A-transferase.
