= Lithophyte =

Plants that grow on rocks

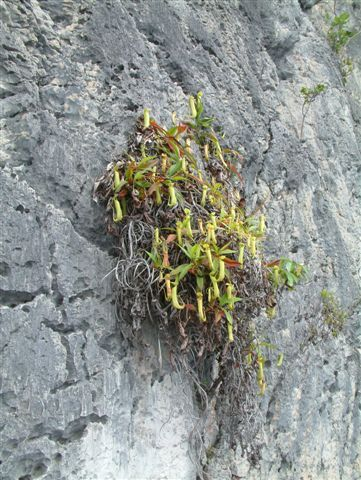
Nepenthes misoolensis growing as a lithophyte in Raja Ampat, New Guinea

Lithophytes are plants that grow in or on rocks. Epilithic (or epipetric) lithophytes grow on the surfaces of rocks, while endolithic (or chasmophytes) lithophytes grow in the cracks or crevices of rocks. Obligate lithophytes grow solely on rocks, while facultative lithophytes will grow partially on a rock and on another substrate simultaneously.

== Nutrients ==
Lithophytes that grow on land feed off nutrients from rain water and nearby decaying plants, including their own dead tissue. It is easier for chasmophytes to acquire nutrients because they grow in fissures in rocks where soil or organic matter has accumulated.

For most lithophytes, nitrogen is only available through interactions with the atmosphere. The most readily available form of nitrogen in the atmosphere is the gaseous state of ammonia (NH_{3}). Lithophytes consume atmospheric ammonia through a concentration gradient that allows the compound to traverse the plants' apoplast. Once free in the apoplast, gaseous ammonia is absorbed into metabolic cells by the enzyme glutamine synthetase.

To be able to absorb the few nutrients available on rocks or rocky substrates efficiently, lithophytes have evolved certain adaptations. They possess decreased numbers of root hairs and larger root diameters in comparison to other plant species. To add to this nutrient uptake efficiency, lithophytic plants have increased their relationship with arbuscular mycorrhizal fungi and dark septate endophyte fungi. These two types of fungi live inter- and intracellularly with the roots of lithophytes and a wide variety of other plant species. They increase the uptake of nutrients and water and have been found in greater concentrations in lithophytes.

== Walls colonised as artificial cliffs by lithophytes ==
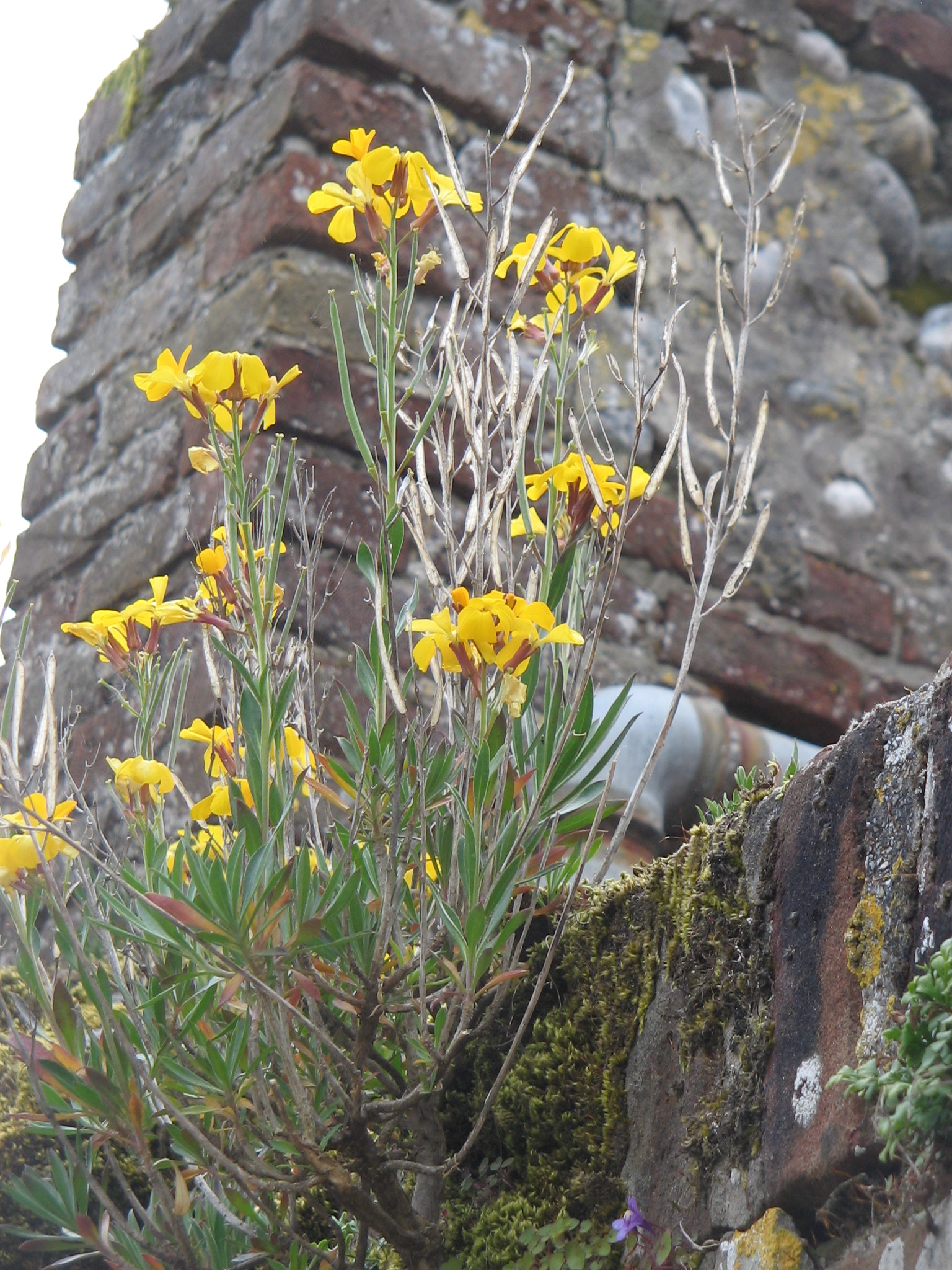
Erysimum cheiri, the wallflower, growing out of the (brick) city wall of Louvain

Walls, and other exposed stonework, are colonised by plants in a similar way to the colonisation of cliffs and scree. These natural features are uncommon, especially in the lowlands, so walls are important for the conservation of plants which might otherwise be very isolated. Some wall plants even have 'wall' or 'muralis' as part of their common or scientific name such as wall-flower (Erysimum cheiri) or ivy-leaved toadflax (Cymbalaria muralis), which shows their long established relationship with these man-made structures.

English Heritage
Landscape Advice Note: Vegetation on Walls

== Examples ==
Examples of lithophytes include many orchids such as Dendrobium and Paphiopedilum, bromeliads such as Tillandsia, as well as many ferns, algae and liverworts. Lithophytes have also been found in many other plant families, such as, Liliaceae, Amaryllidaceae, Begoniaceae, Caprifoliaceae, Crassulaceae, Piperaceae and Selaginellaceae.

=== Carnivorous plants ===
As nutrients tend to be rarely available to lithophytes or chasmophytes, many species of carnivorous plants can be viewed as being pre-adapted to life on rocks. By consuming prey, these plants can gather more nutrients than non-carnivorous lithophytes. Examples include the pitcher plants Nepenthes campanulata and Heliamphora exappendiculata, many Pinguicula and several Utricularia species.

== Tennyson poem inspired by lithophyte ==
In the year 1863, Alfred, Lord Tennyson was moved to write his short and pithy poem of metaphysical speculation Flower in the Crannied Wall upon contemplating an unnamed lithophyte growing out of the masonry of the wishing well at Waggoners Wells.

Flower in the crannied wall,
I pluck you out of the crannies,
I hold you here, root and all, in my hand,
Little flower—but if I could understand
What you are, root and all, and all in all,
I should know what God and man is.

== Gallery ==
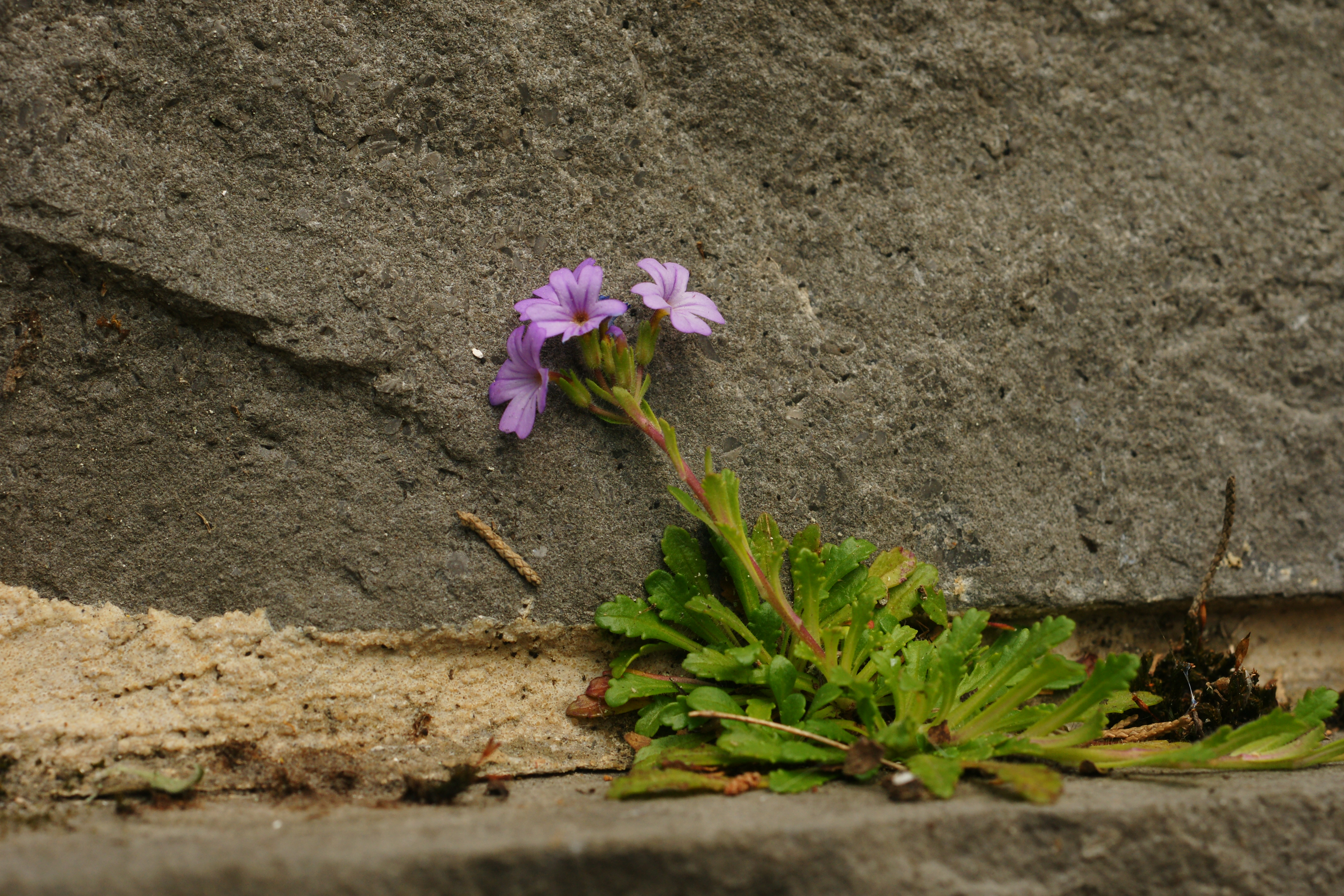
Erinus alpinus, the fairy foxglove, growing out of a crack in the mortar of a stone wall

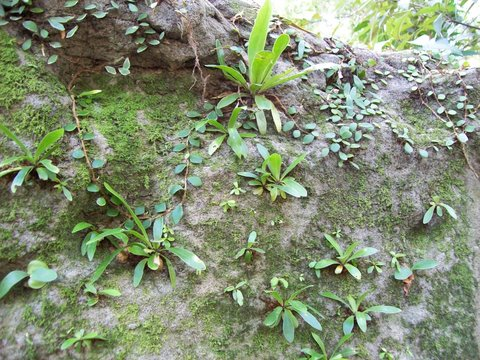
Rock Felt Fern, Elkhorn fern, Birds Nest Fern and moss growing on Hawkesbury Sandstone at Chatswood West, Australia

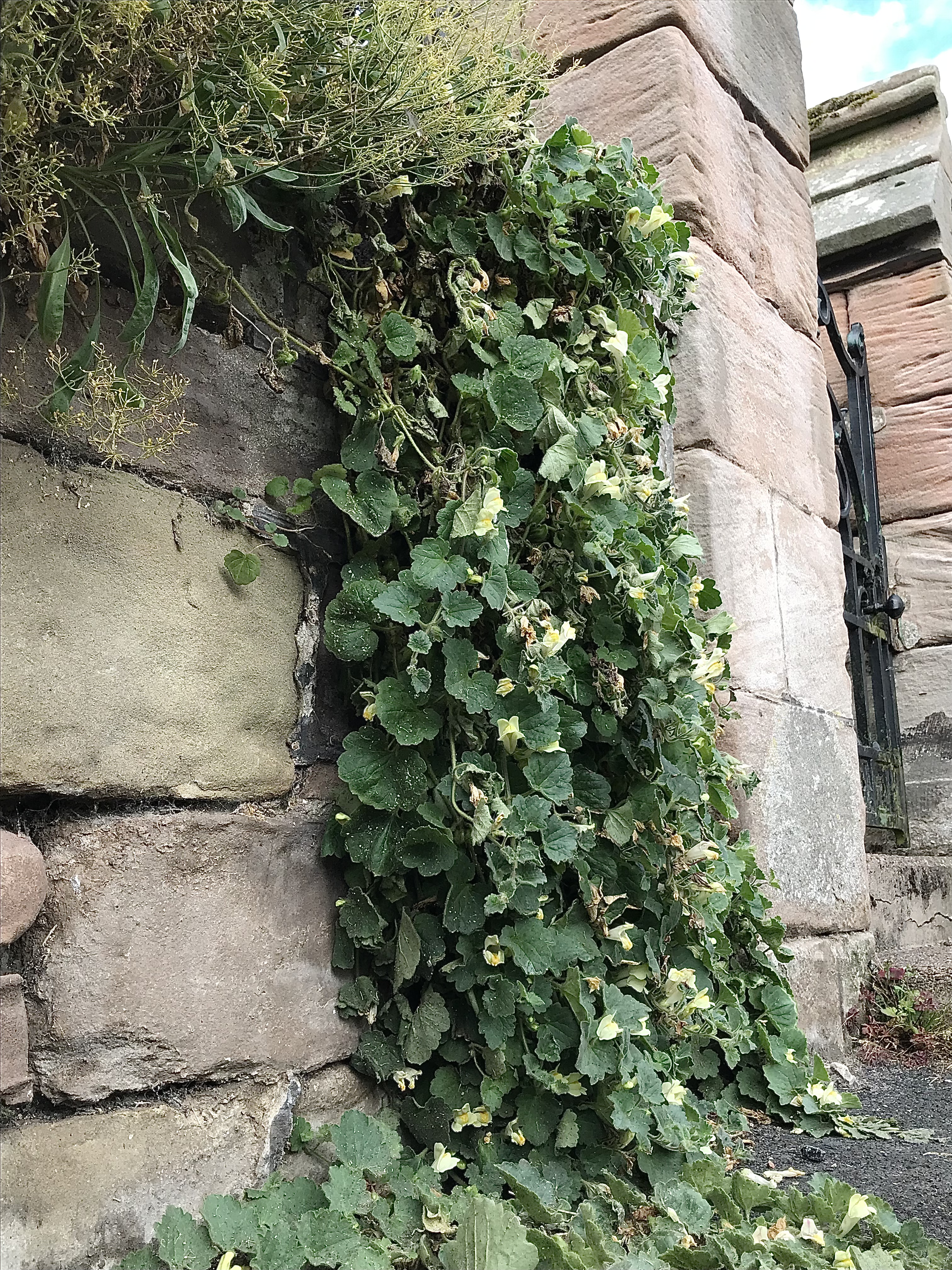
Asarina procumbens, the trailing snapdragon, colonising a crevice in a Berwickshire sandstone church wall - just as it would a siliceous inland cliff in its native Pyrenees

== See also ==
- Epibiont, an organism that grows on another life form
- Epiphyte
- Endosymbiont
- Epiphytic fungus
- Epiphytic bacteria
- Foliicolous
