= 5-aminopentanamidase =

Class of enzymes

Identifiers
- EC no.: 3.5.1.30
- CAS no.: 9054-60-8

Databases
- BRENDA: enzyme data
- ExPASy: NiceZyme view
- KEGG: enzyme entry
- MetaCyc: metabolic pathway
- Rhea: reactions
- PDB structures: RCSB PDB PDBe PDBsum
- Gene Ontology: AmiGO / QuickGO
Search
- PMC: articles
- PubMed: articles
- NCBI: proteins

5-aminopentanamidase (EC 3.5.1.30) is an enzyme that catalyzes the chemical reaction

5-aminopentanamide
H_{2}O
NH_{3}
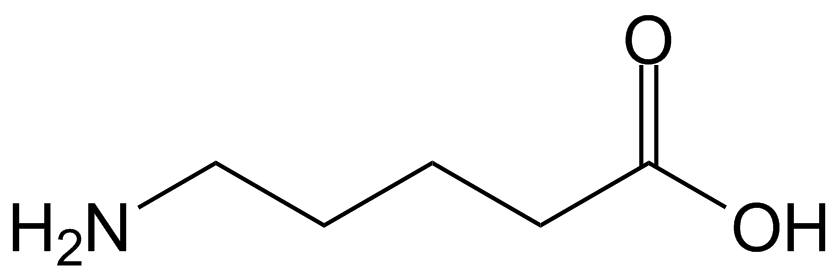
5-aminopentanoic acid

The enzyme characterised from Pseudomonas putida hydrolyses 5-aminopentanamide to 5-aminopentanoic acid and ammonia. The reaction is part of the breakdown pathway for the amino acid, lysine.

This enzyme is a hydrolase, one acting on carbon-nitrogen bonds other than peptide bonds, specifically in linear amides. The systematic name of this enzyme class is 5-aminopentanamide amidohydrolase. Other names in common use include 5-aminovaleramidase, and 5-aminonorvaleramidase.
