= (2,2,3-Trimethyl-5-oxocyclopent-3-enyl)acetyl-CoA 1,5-monooxygenase =

Class of enzymes

Identifiers
- EC no.: 1.14.13.160

Databases
- IntEnz: IntEnz view
- BRENDA: BRENDA entry
- ExPASy: NiceZyme view
- KEGG: KEGG entry
- MetaCyc: metabolic pathway
- PRIAM: profile
- PDB structures: RCSB PDB PDBe PDBsum
Search
- PMC: articles
- PubMed: articles
- NCBI: proteins

(2,2,3-Trimethyl-5-oxocyclopent-3-enyl)acetyl-CoA 1,5-monooxygenase (EC 1.14.13.160, 2-oxo-Delta3-4,5,5-trimethylcyclopentenylacetyl-CoA monooxygenase, 2-oxo-Delta3-4,5,5-trimethylcyclopentenylacetyl-CoA 1,2-monooxygenase, OTEMO) is an enzyme with systematic name ((1R)-2,2,3-trimethyl-5-oxocyclopent-3-enyl)acetyl-CoA,NADPH:oxygen oxidoreductase (1,5-lactonizing). This enzyme catalyses the following chemical reaction

[(1R)-2,2,3-trimethyl-5-oxocyclopent-3-enyl]acetyl-CoA + O_{2} + NADPH + H^{+} $\rightleftharpoons$ [(2R)-3,3,4-trimethyl-6-oxo-3,6-dihydro-1H-pyran-2-yl]acetyl-CoA + NADP^{+} + H_{2}O

(2,2,3-trimethyl-5-oxocyclopent-3-enyl)acetyl-CoA 1,5-monooxygenase is FAD dependent enzyme isolated from Pseudomonas putida.
