= 1-pyrroline-4-hydroxy-2-carboxylate deaminase =

Class of enzymes

Identifiers
- EC no.: 3.5.4.22
- CAS no.: 9054-77-7

Databases
- BRENDA: enzyme data
- ExPASy: NiceZyme view
- KEGG: enzyme entry
- MetaCyc: metabolic pathway
- Rhea: reactions
- PDB structures: RCSB PDB PDBe PDBsum
- Gene Ontology: AmiGO / QuickGO
Search
- PMC: articles
- PubMed: articles
- NCBI: proteins

1-pyrroline-4-hydroxy-2-carboxylate deaminase (EC 3.5.4.22) is an enzyme characterised from Pseudomonas striata that catalyzes the hydrolysis of 4-hydroxy-1-pyrroline-2-carboxylic acid to 2,5-dioxopentanoic acid and ammonia:

4-hydroxy-1-pyrroline-2-carboxylic acid
H_{2}O
NH_{3}
2,5-dioxopentanoic acid

The reaction is part of the breakdown pathway for the amino acid, proline, in bacteria. The hydroxy proline precursor comes mainly from the breakdown of collagen.

This enzyme is a hydrolase, one acting on carbon-nitrogen bonds other than peptide bonds, specifically in cyclic amidines. The systematic name of this enzyme class is 1-pyrroline-4-hydroxy-2-carboxylate aminohydrolase (decyclizing). This enzyme is also called HPC deaminase.
