= Acetylpyruvate hydrolase =

Class of enzymes

Identifiers
- EC no.: 3.7.1.6
- CAS no.: 56214-30-3

Databases
- BRENDA: enzyme data
- ExPASy: NiceZyme view
- KEGG: enzyme entry
- MetaCyc: metabolic pathway
- Rhea: reactions
- PDB structures: RCSB PDB PDBe PDBsum
- Gene Ontology: AmiGO / QuickGO
Search
- PMC: articles
- PubMed: articles
- NCBI: proteins

Acetylpyruvate hydrolase (EC 3.7.1.6) is an enzyme characterised from Pseudomonas putida that catalyzes the hydrolysis of acetylpyruvic acid to pyruvic acid and acetic acid:

acetylpyruvic acid
H_{2}O
pyruvic acid
+
acetic acid

The enzyme does not require any cofactor and have been suggested as being useful in synthesis.

This enzyme is a hydrolase, specifically one acting on carbon-carbon bonds in ketonic substances. The systematic name of this enzyme class is 2,4-dioxopentanoate acetylhydrolase.
