= Foliicolous =

Concept in plant science

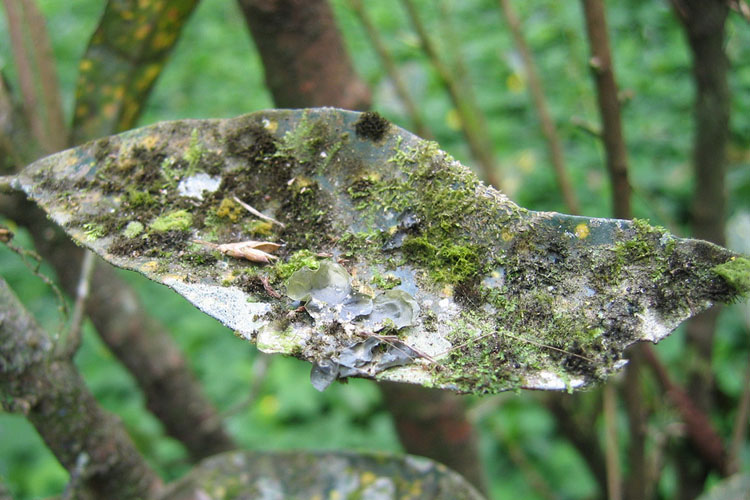
Foliicolous lichens growing on a leaf on the Amazon jungle near Tena, Ecuador

Foliicolous refers to the growth habit of certain lichens, algae, fungi, liverworts, and other bryophytes that prefer to grow on the leaves of vascular plants. Foliicolous simply means 'growing upon leaves' whilst epiphyllous derives from the Greek epi- meaning on or over and phyllous means leaf so 'over leaf' and hypophyllous means 'under leaf'. The microhabitat on the leaf surface is called a phyllosphere.

== See also ==
- Epibiont
- Epiphytes
- Phyllosphere
- Epiphytic fungus
- Parasitic plant
- Epilith
- Microbiota
