= Pseudomonas fulva =

Scientific classification
- Domain: Bacteria
- Kingdom: Pseudomonadati
- Phylum: Pseudomonadota
- Class: Gammaproteobacteria
- Order: Pseudomonadales
- Family: Pseudomonadaceae
- Genus: Pseudomonas
- Species: P. fulva

Binomial name
- Pseudomonas fulva Iizuka and Komagata 1963

Type strain
- ATCC 31418 CIP 106765; IAM 1529; JCM 11242; LMG 11722; NBRC 16637

Species of bacterium

Pseudomonas fulva is a Gram-negative environmental bacterium, originally isolated from rice and commonly associated with rice plants, grains and paddy fields. It is rod-shaped and motile using one to three polar flagella.

Based on 16S rRNA analysis, P. fulva has been placed in the P. putida group.

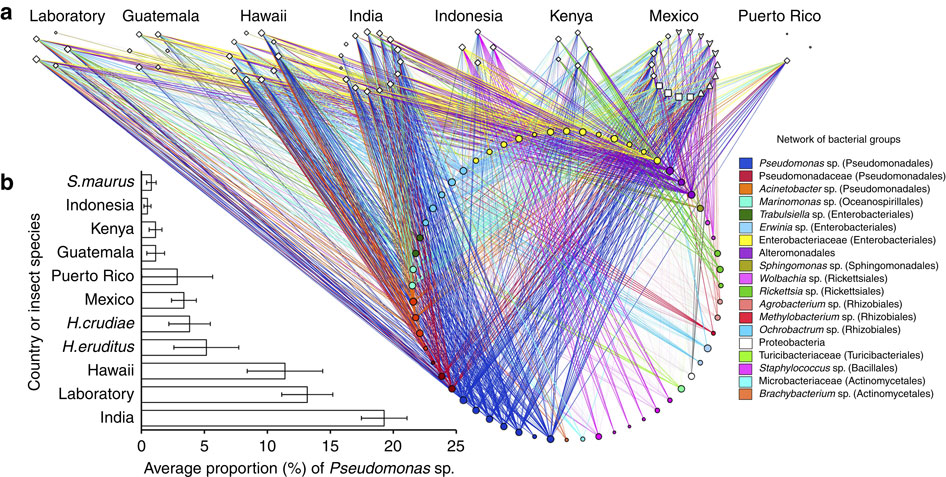
Frequency and distribution of certain bacteria in the gut of coffee bean beetle

P. fulva is symbiotic in the gut of Hypothenemus hampei, the primary pest of coffee seeds. It has been shown to thrive by digesting caffeine to obtain nitrogen, while enabling the host insect to live on green coffee berries without harm. P. fulva was one of 14 bacteria found in the digestive tract of the insects to thrive in a medium high in caffeine. The bacteria were screened for the gene ndmA that is known to transform caffeine; only P. fulva possessed this gene. The other bacteria are thought to help break down the caffeine using different genes.
