= Pseudomonas monteilii =

Scientific classification
- Domain: Bacteria
- Kingdom: Pseudomonadati
- Phylum: Pseudomonadota
- Class: Gammaproteobacteria
- Order: Pseudomonadales
- Family: Pseudomonadaceae
- Genus: Pseudomonas
- Species: P. monteilii

Binomial name
- Pseudomonas monteilii Elomari, et al. 1997

Type strain
- ATCC 700476 CCUG 38736; CFML 90-60; CIP 104883; DSM 14164; JCM 21585

Species of bacterium

Pseudomonas monteilii is a Gram-negative, rod-shaped, motile bacterium isolated from human bronchial aspirate. P. monteilii grows in temperatures below 40 degrees Celsius. The species is capable of respiratory metabolism, but not fermentative metabolism. Laboratory observations were made on the species' production of fluorescent pigments, cytochrome oxidases, and catalases. The species is named in honor of the French microbiologist Henri Monteil.

Based on 16S rRNA analysis, P. monteilii has been placed in the P. putida group. Commonly found in the environment, P. putida is a pathogen associated with infections in wounds and urinary tract, arthritis, osteomyelitis, and various other diseases.
