= Pseudomonas entomophila =

Scientific classification
- Domain: Bacteria
- Kingdom: Pseudomonadati
- Phylum: Pseudomonadota
- Class: Gammaproteobacteria
- Order: Pseudomonadales
- Family: Pseudomonadaceae
- Genus: Pseudomonas
- Species: P. entomophila

Binomial name
- Pseudomonas entomophila Mulet et al. 2012

Species of bacterium

Pseudomonas entomophila is a strain of bacterium that lives in the soil and can infect insects. It is closely related to Pseudomonas putida.
