= Epiphyte =

Surface organism that grows upon another plant but is not nourished by it

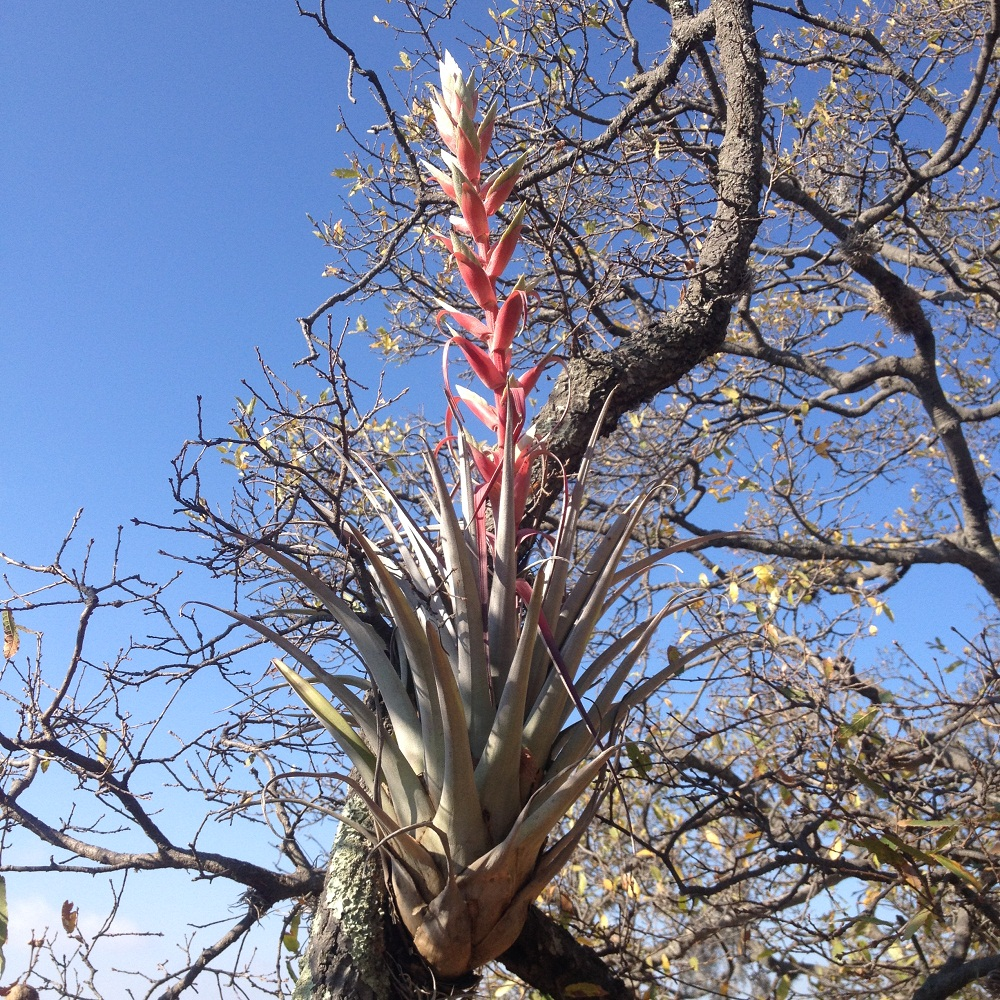
Tillandsia bourgaei growing on an oak tree in Mexico

An epiphyte (from Ancient Greek epi-, meaning 'upon', and phutón, meaning 'plant') is a plant or plant-like organism that grows on the surface of another plant or plant-like organism. It derives its moisture and nutrients from the air, rain, water (in marine environments) or from debris accumulating around it. The plants on which epiphytes grow are called phorophytes. Epiphytes take part in nutrient cycles and add to both the diversity and biomass of the ecosystem in which they occur, like any other organism. In some cases, a rainforest tree's epiphytes may weigh several tonnes. Epiphytes differ from parasitic plants in that they grow on the host for physical support only, and do not draw nourishment from it. An organism that grows on another organism that is not a plant may be called an epibiont. Epiphytes are usually found in the temperate zone (e.g., many mosses, liverworts, lichens, and algae) or in the tropics (e.g., many ferns, cacti, orchids, and bromeliads). Epiphyte species make good houseplants due to their minimal water and soil requirements. Epiphytes provide a rich and diverse habitat for other organisms including animals, fungi, bacteria, and myxomycetes.

Epiphyte is one of the subdivisions of the Raunkiær system. The term epiphytic derives from Greek epi- 'upon' and phyton 'plant'. Epiphytic plants are sometimes called "air plants" because they do not root in soil. However, that term is inaccurate, as there are many aquatic species of algae that are epiphytes on other aquatic plants (seaweeds or aquatic angiosperms).

== Epiphytes in terrestrial ecosystems ==
Epiphytic plants include mosses, orchids, and bromeliads such as Spanish moss (of the genus Tillandsia), but epiphytes may be found in every major group of the plant kingdom. About 89% of (or about 24,000) terrestrial epiphyte species are flowering plants. The second largest group are the leptosporangiate ferns, with about 2,800 species (10% of epiphytes). About one-third of all fern species are epiphytes. The third largest group is clubmosses, with 190 species, followed by a handful of species in each of the spikemosses, other ferns, Gnetales, and cycads. Within the Neotropics, there are estimated to be total of 15,500 species of epiphytic vascular plants.

A monograph on epiphytic plant ecology was written by A. F. W. Schimper (Die epiphytische Vegetation Amerikas, 1888). Assemblages of large epiphytes occur most abundantly in moist tropical forests, but mosses and lichens occur as epiphytes in almost all biomes. In Europe there are no dedicated epiphytic plants using roots, but rich assemblages of mosses and lichens grow on trees in damp areas (mainly the western coastal fringe), and the common polypody fern grows epiphytically along branches. Rarely, grass, small bushes or small trees may grow in suspended soils up trees (typically in a rot-hole).

Terrestrial epiphytes
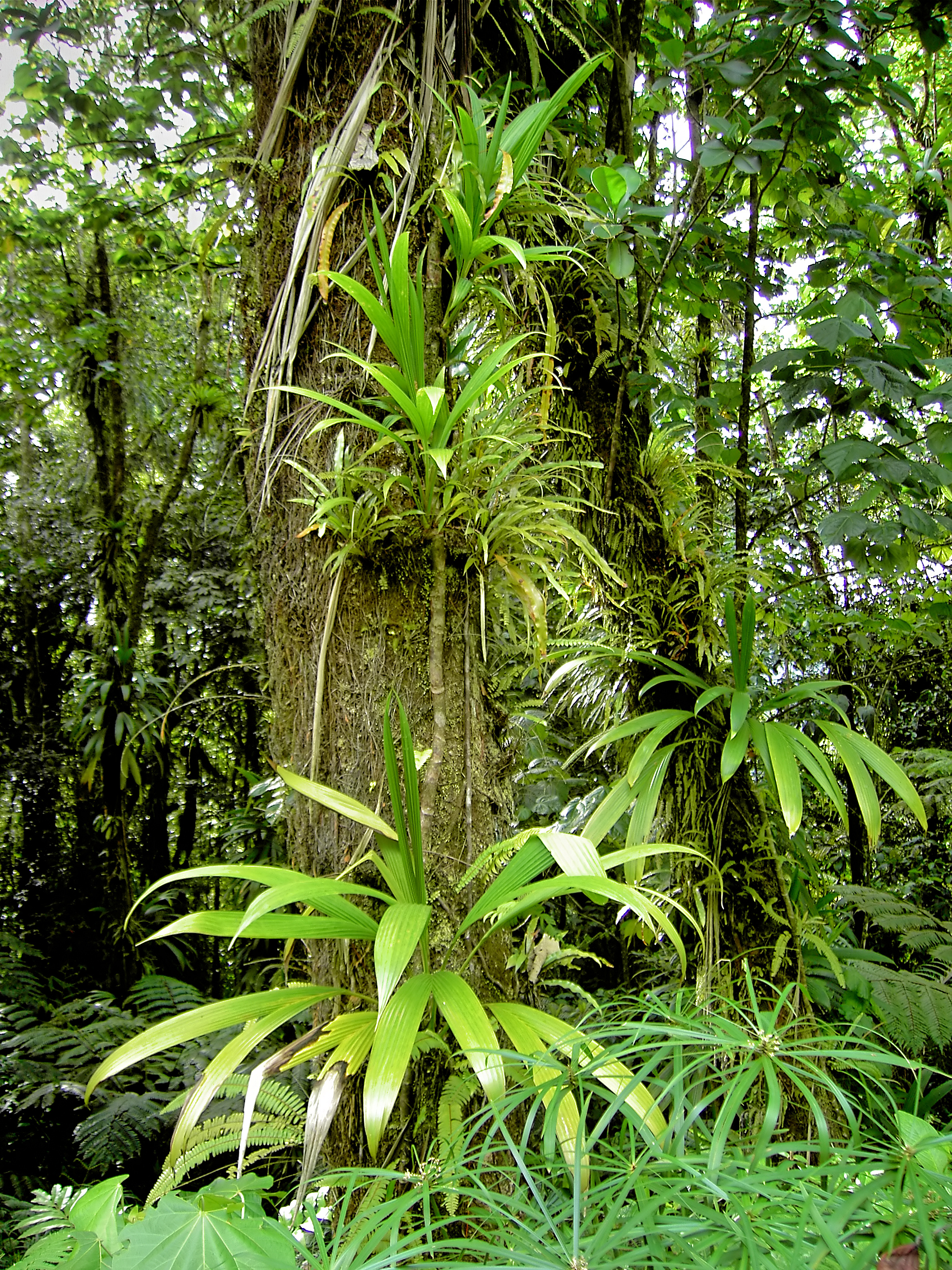
Epiphytes can grow on the trunks of trees or sometimes in the canopy of a tree

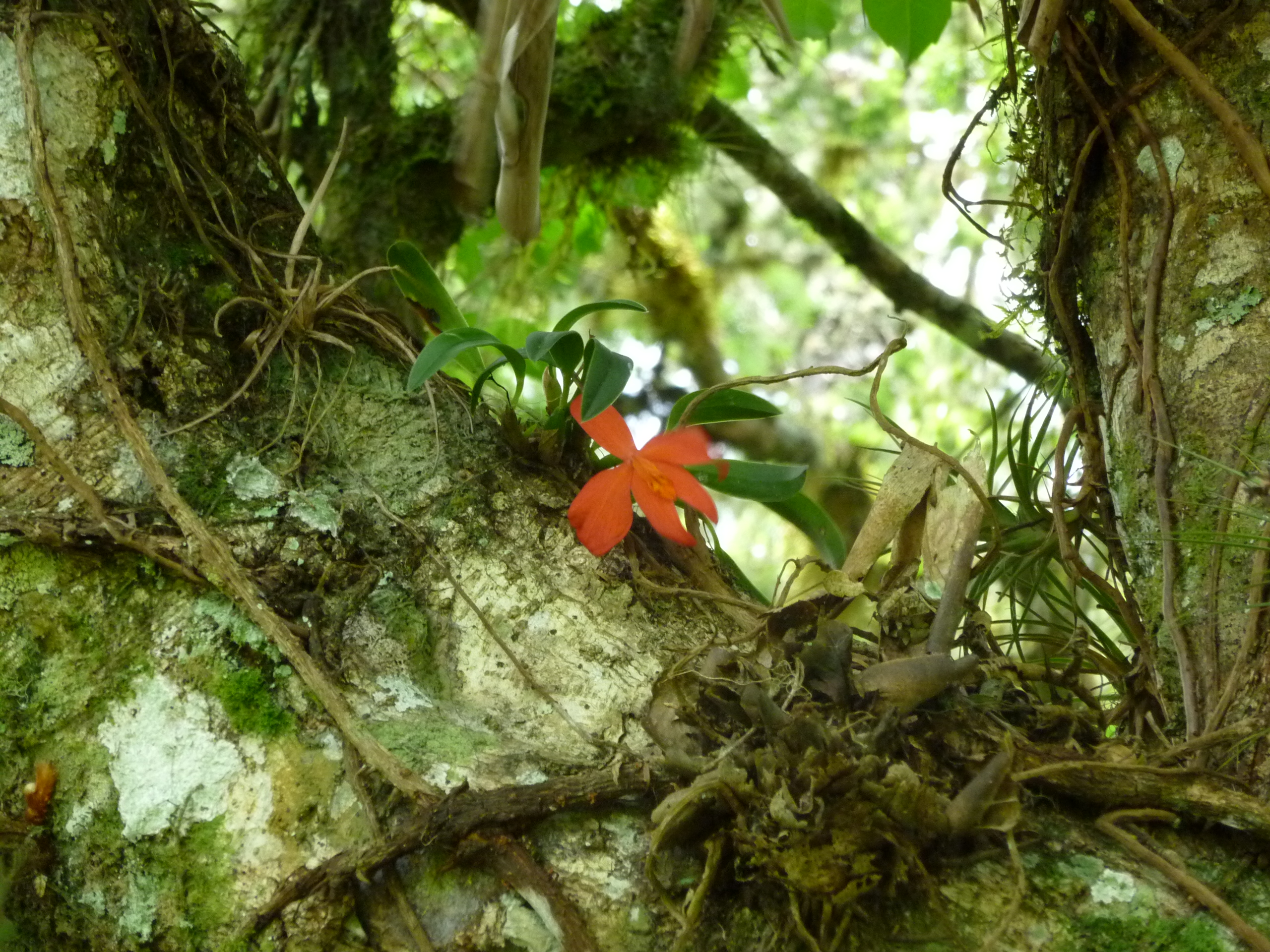
An epiphytic orchid on a tree in a Brazilian cloud forest

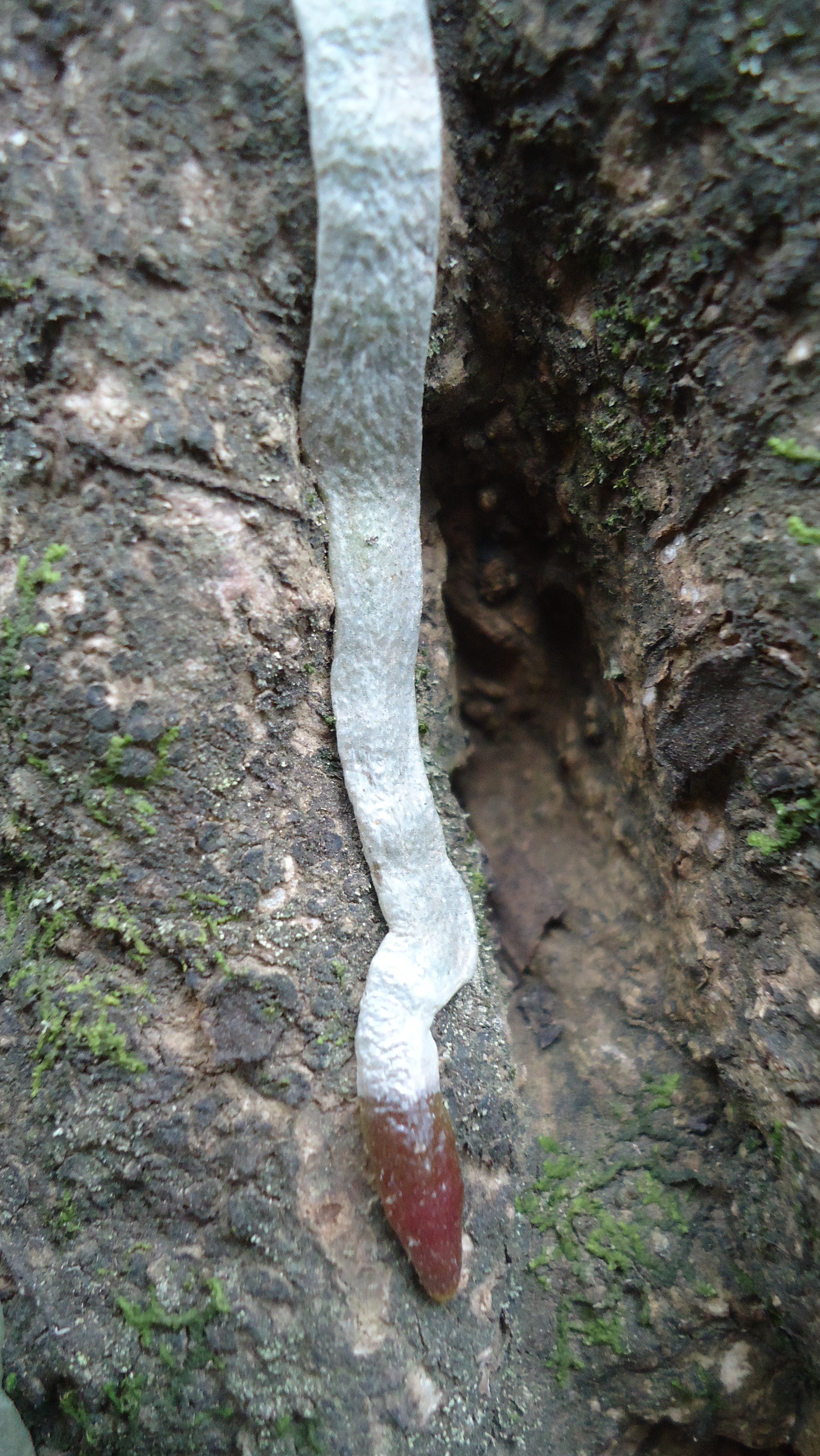
Clinging root of an orchid

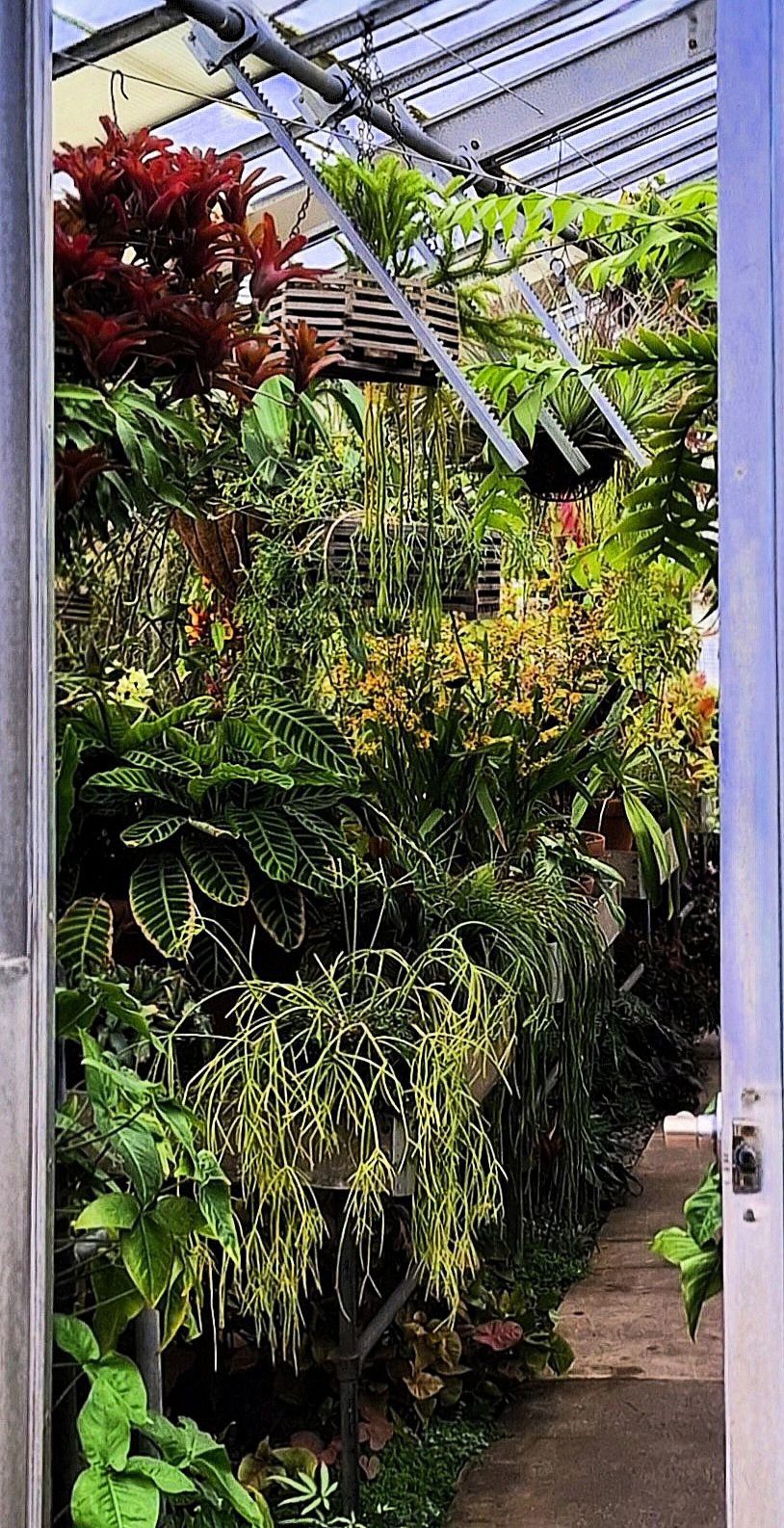
Plants in a conservatory, including a Neoregelia bromeliad (upper left), several Rhipsalis species (lower center), and other epiphytes

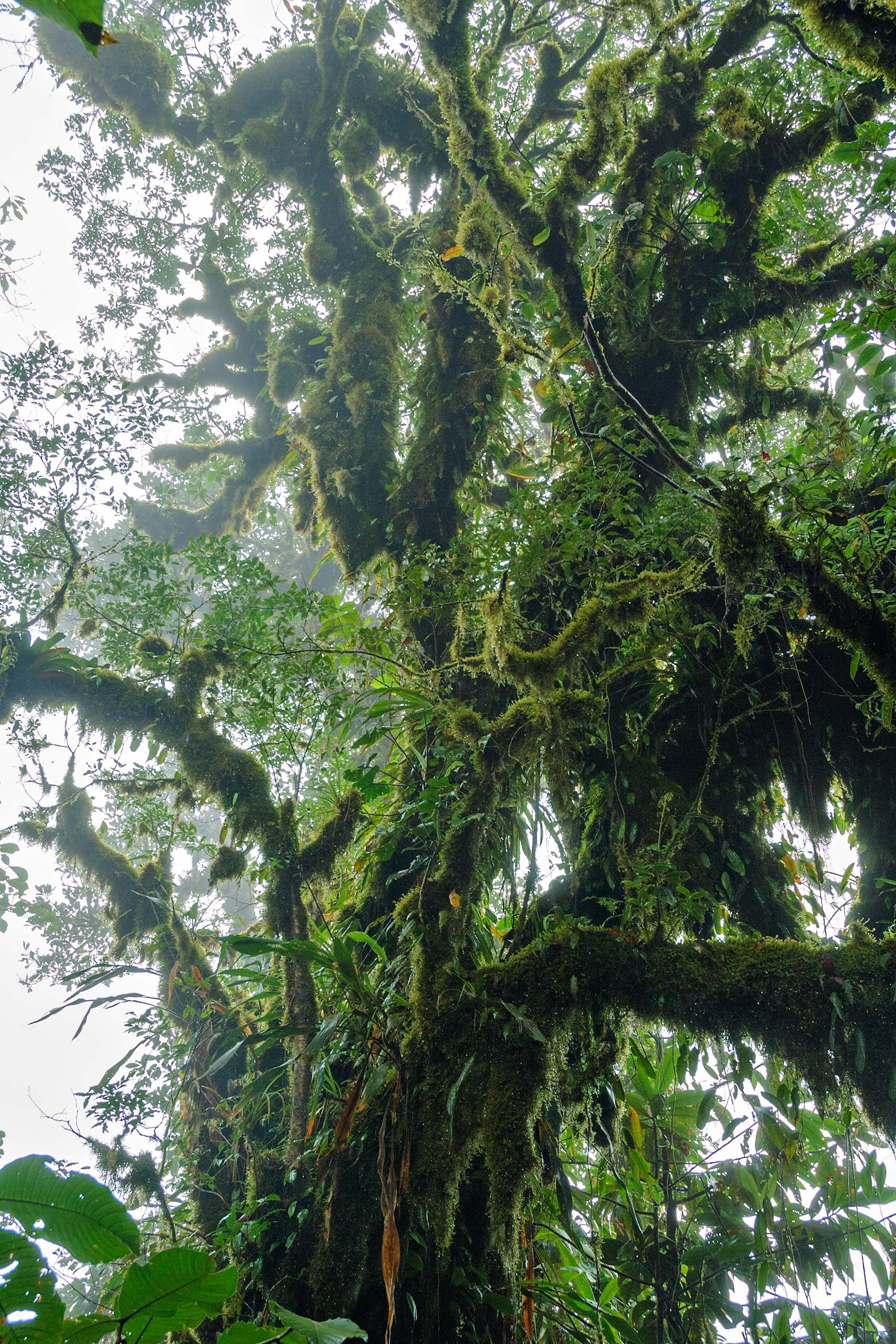
Epiphytic plants overgrowing trees on the Cerro Chato volcano, Fortuna, Costa Rica

=== Holo-epiphyte or hemi-epiphyte ===
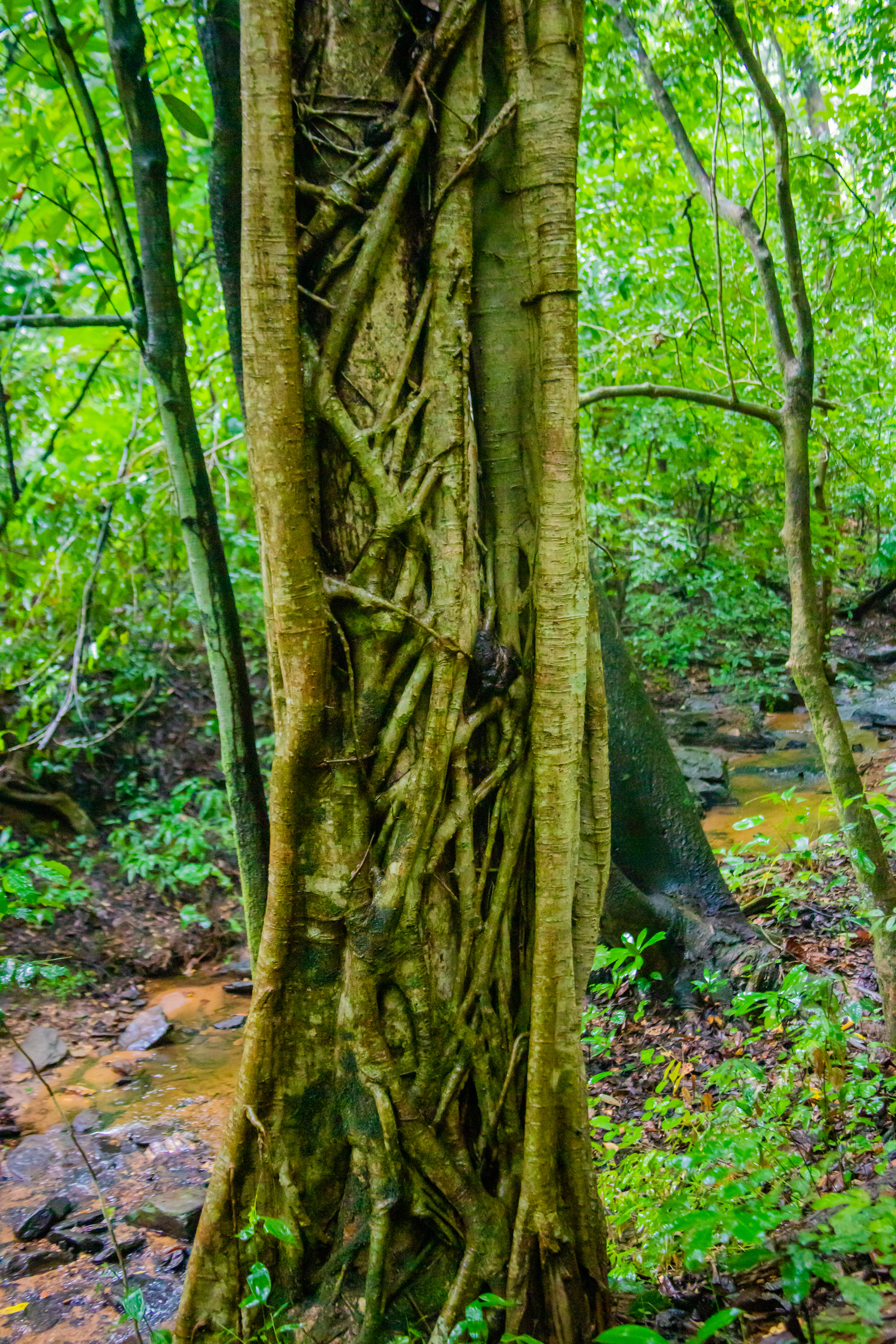
Strangler fig growing around another tree

Epiphytes can generally be categorized into holo-epiphytes or hemi-epiphytes. A holo-epiphyte is a plant that spends its whole life cycle without contact with the ground and a hemi-epiphyte is a plant that spends only half of its life without the ground before the roots can reach or make contact with the ground. Orchids are a common example of holo-epiphytes and strangler figs are an example of hemi-epiphytes.

=== Plant nutrient relations ===
Epiphytes are not connected to the soil, and consequently must get nutrients from other sources, such as fog, dew, rain and mist, or from nutrients being released from the ground rooted plants by decomposition or leaching, and dinitrogen fixation. Epiphytic plants attached to their hosts high in the canopy have an advantage over herbs restricted to the ground where there is less light and herbivores may be more active. Epiphytic plants are also important to certain animals that may live in their water reservoirs, such as some types of frogs and arthropods.

Epiphytes can have a significant effect on the microenvironment of their host, and of ecosystems where they are abundant, as they hold water in the canopy and decrease water input to the soil. Some non-vascular epiphytes such as lichens and mosses are well known for their ability to take up water rapidly. Epiphytes create a significantly cooler and more moist environment in the host plant canopy, potentially greatly reducing water loss by the host through transpiration.

=== Plant metabolism ===
CAM metabolism, a water-preserving metabolism present among various plant taxa, is particularly relevant to epiphytic communities. For example, it is estimated that among epiphytic orchids, as many as 50% are likely to use it. Other relevant epiphytic families which display such metabolism are Bromeliacee (e.g. in genera Aechmea and Tillandsia), Cactaceae (e.g. in Rhipsalis and Epiphyllum) and Apocynaceae (e.g. in Hoya and Dischidia).

== Epiphytes in marine ecosystems ==
The ecology of epiphytes in marine environments differs from those in terrestrial ecosystems. Epiphytes in marine systems are species of algae, bacteria, fungi, sponges, bryozoans, ascidians, protozoa, crustaceans, molluscs and any other sessile organism that grows on the surface of a plant, typically seagrasses or algae. Settlement of epiphytic species is influenced by a number of factors including light, temperature, currents, nutrients, and trophic interactions. Algae are the most common group of epiphytes in marine systems. Photosynthetic epiphytes account for a large amount of the photosynthesis in systems in which they occur. This is typically between 20 and 60% of the total primary production of the ecosystem. They are a general group of organisms and are highly diverse, providing food for a great number of fauna. Snail and nudibranch species are two common grazers of epiphytes. Epiphyte species composition and the amount of epiphytes can be indicative of changes in the environment. Recent increases in epiphyte abundance have been linked to excessive nitrogen put into the environment from farm runoff and storm water. High abundance of epiphytes are considered detrimental to the plants that they grow on often causing damage or death, particularly in seagrasses. This is because too many epiphytes can block access to sunlight or nutrients. Epiphytes in marine systems are known to grow quickly with very fast generation times.

Marine epiphytes
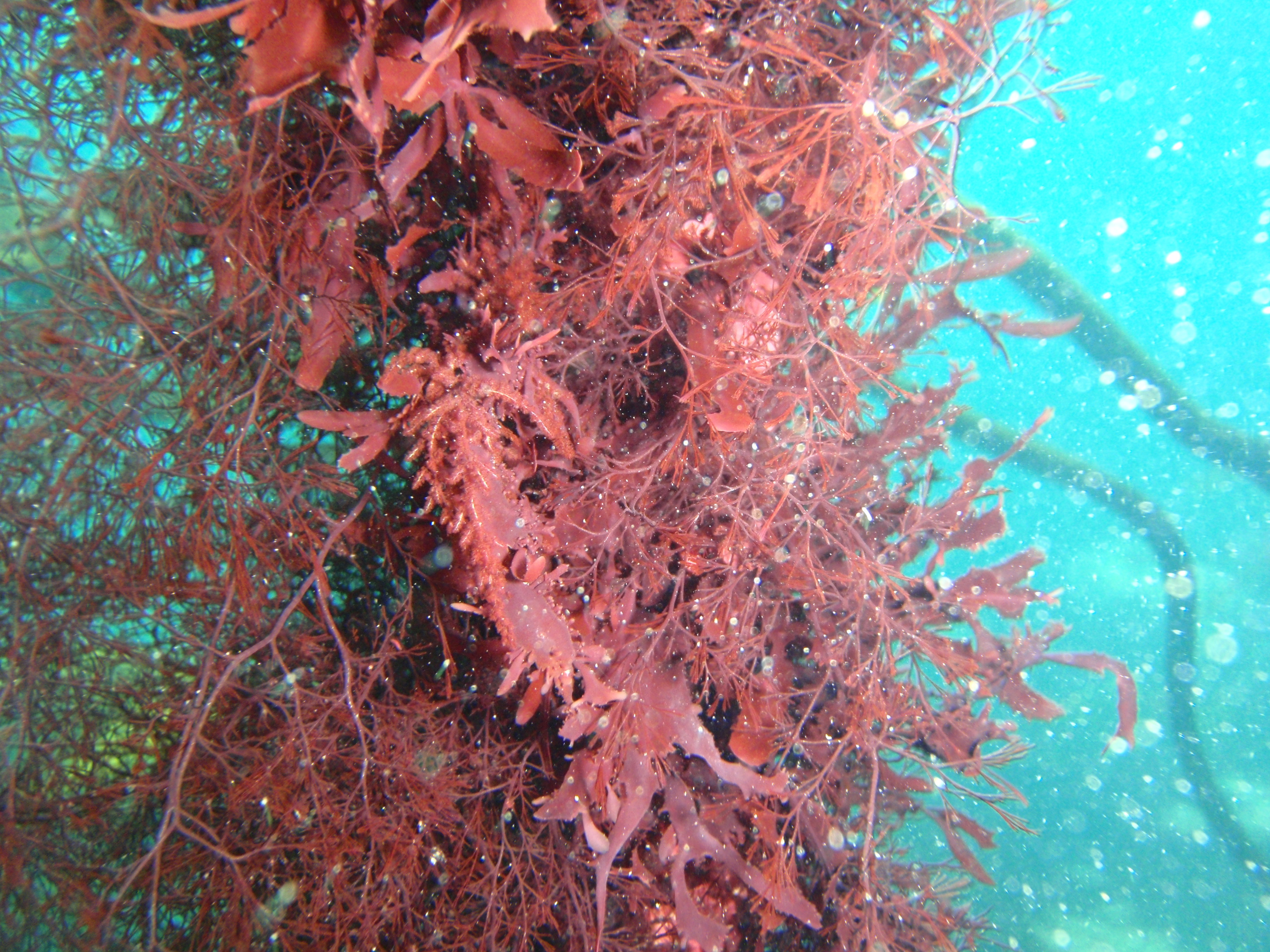
Heavy epiphyte growth on kelp stipe

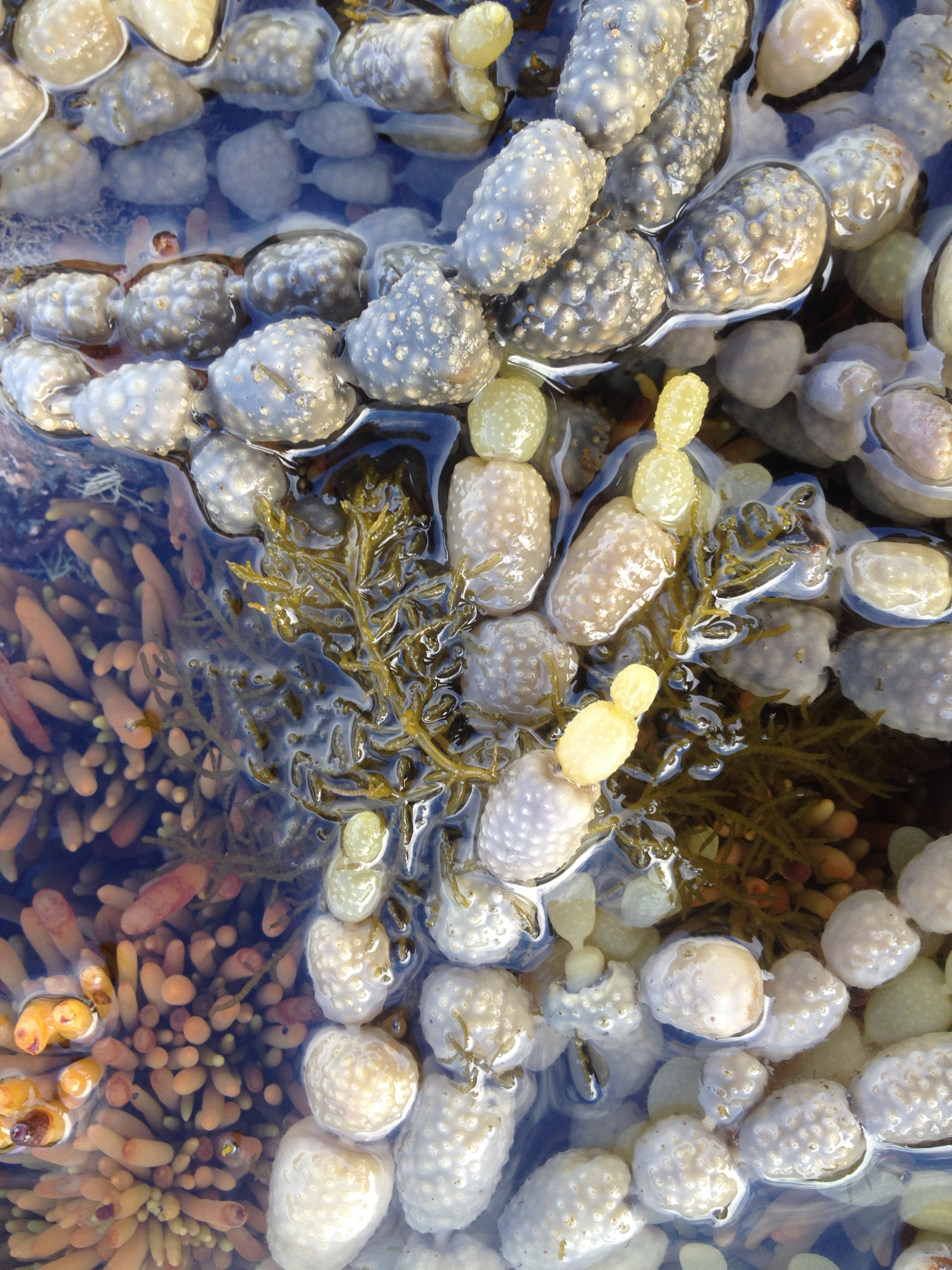
Notheia anomala growing on Hormosira banksii

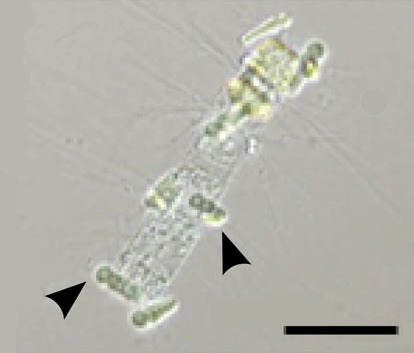
Epiphytic Calothrix cyanobacteria (arrows) in symbiosis with a Chaetoceros diatom (scale bar 50 μm)

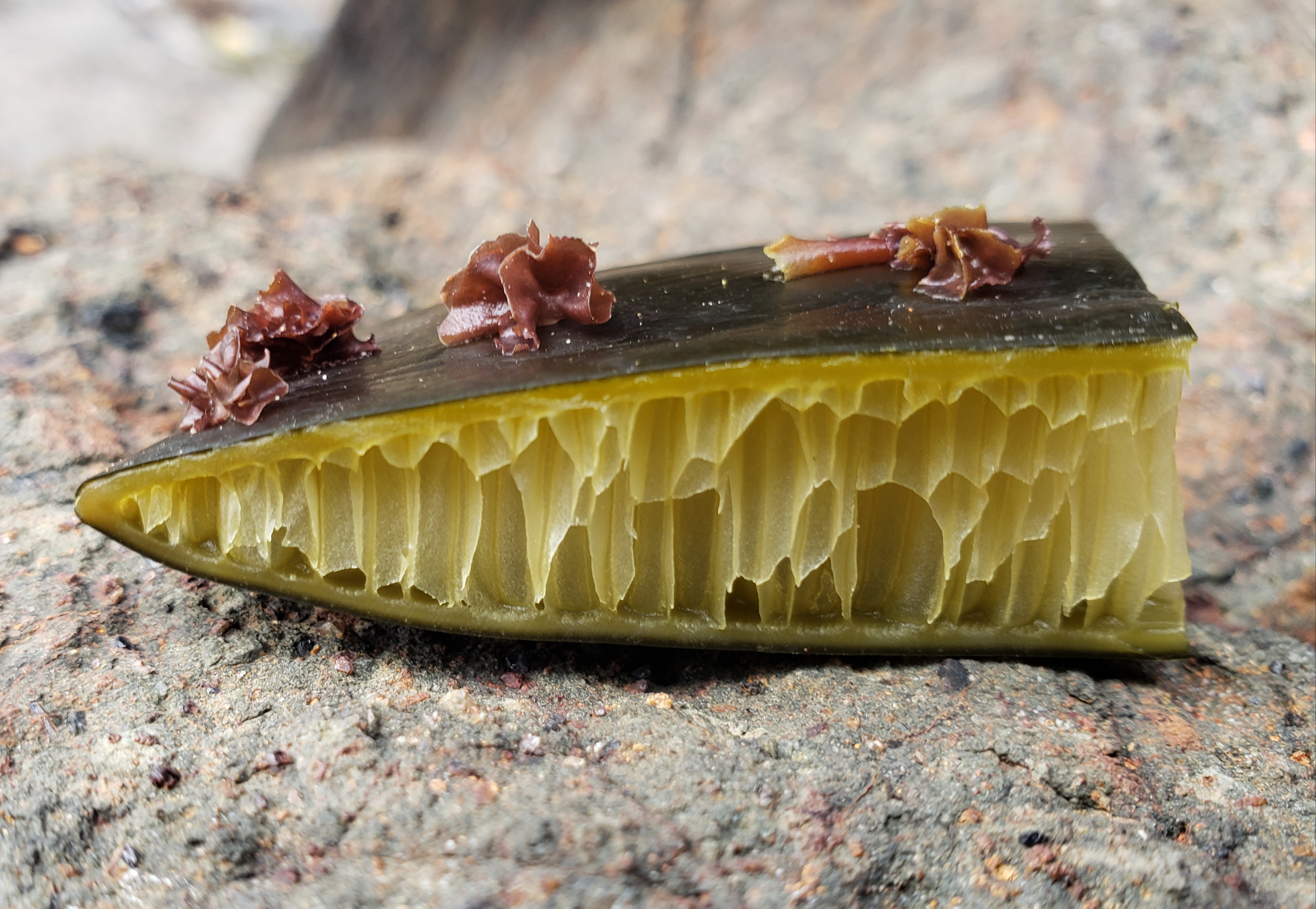
Cross-section of a Durvillaea antarctica frond, showing Pyrophyllon subtumens growing on the outer surface

== See also ==
- Lithophyte – a plant that grows on rocks
- Tillandsia – a genus of the Bromeliaceae
- Epiphyllum – a genus of epiphytic cacti
- Parasitic plant
- Epilith, an organism that grows in a rock
- Foliicolous, lichens or bryophytes that grow on leaves of vascular plants
- Epiphytic bacteria
- Epiphytic fungus
- Canopy soils
