= Epiphytic fungus =

Fungus that grows on, or attached to, a living plant

An epiphytic fungus is a fungus that grows upon, or attached to, a living plant. The term epiphytic derives from the Greek epi- (meaning 'upon') and phyton (meaning 'plant').

== Examples ==
Many examples of epiphytic microorganisms exist. The ergoline alkaloids found in Convolvulaceae are produced by a seed-transmitted epiphytic clavicipitaceous fungus .

== See also ==
- Foliicolous, lichens or bryophytes that grow on leaves
- Epiphyte
- Endosymbiont
- Epilith, an organism that grows in a rock
- Epibiont, an organism that grows on another life form
- Epiphytic bacteria
- Mycorrhiza
