= Canopy soils =

Organic matter on tree branches hosting epiphytes and other arboreal biomass

Canopy soils, also known as arboreal soils, exist in areas of the forest canopy where branches, crevices, or some other physical feature on a tree can accumulate organic matter, such as leaves or fine branches. Eventually, this organic matter weathers into some semblance of a soil, and can reach depths of 30 cm in some temperate rainforests.

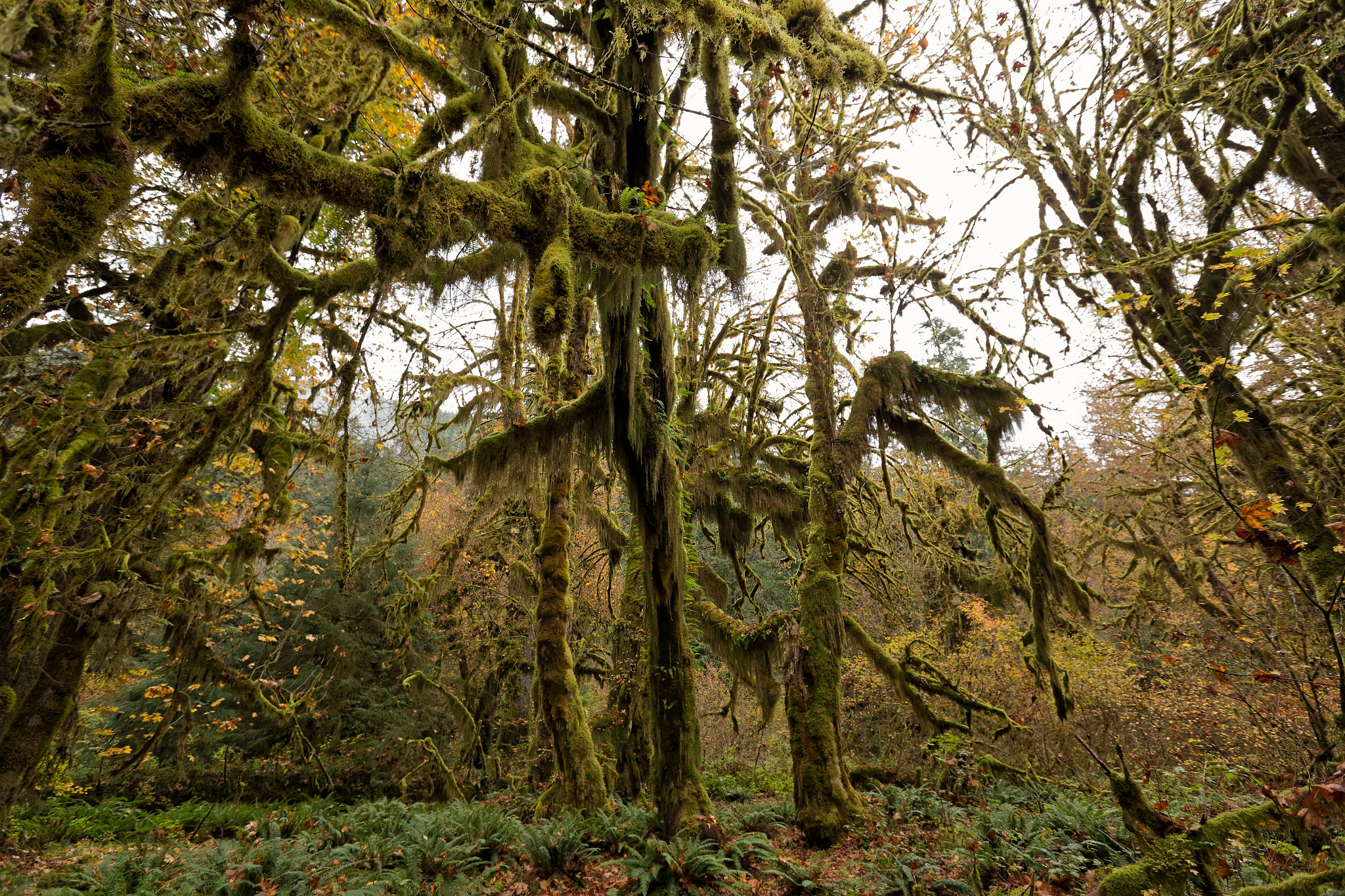
Pictured above are canopy soils in maple trees in Olympic National Park in Port Angeles, Washington. The specific epiphyte type seen above is moss.

Epiphytes can take root in the canopy soil, which accelerates the development of the soil by adding organic material and physically breaking up material with their root system. The nutrients that become stored within canopy soils can then be utilized by the epiphytes that grow in them, and even the tree that the canopy soil is accumulating in through the growth of canopy roots. This storage allows nutrients to be more closely cycled through an ecosystem, and prevents nutrients from being washed out of the system. The nitrogen cycle is most prevalent in canopy soil ecosystems with regards to the biogeochemical cycles that naturally exist within forest environments.

Canopy soils play a role in maintaining the normal functioning of forest ecosystems that they exist in. Canopy soils are acutely vulnerable to climate change, human disturbances, and other various disturbances that may occur. The decomposition of epiphytic communities due to these factors can impact these soils and their environments negatively.

== Development ==
Numerous factors are involved in evaluating the characteristics of a developing canopy soil. The types of plant material that accumulate on canopy soils can strongly influence the conditions that develop, including pH, moisture content, nutrient content, and nutrient availability for the soil. The age of the canopy is also important to its development. Older canopies can accumulate more material and create a deeper soil. Within the soil, the organic material will further decompose in an older canopy soil, and will have less fibrous material than a younger canopy soil. Perhaps more intuitively, the height at which organic material begins to accumulate can also significantly impact the development of canopy soils. Canopy soils higher in a forest's canopy will be more exposed to the elements, resulting in a higher exposure to sunlight and wind, which could result in extreme shifts in available soil moisture.

Most epiphytes have very shallow root systems, mainly used to attach them to their host tree. Thus moisture-dependent epiphytes in shallow root systems are more sensitive to changes in moisture content, and at risk of desiccation. In contrast, canopy soils that form lower in the canopy are more likely to be sheltered from more extreme swings in light exposure and moisture content. Additionally, lower canopy soils also have a greater chance of accumulating organic matter that falls from higher neighboring trees, or from the higher regions of the tree housing the canopy soil. This allows these lower canopy soils to accumulate more organic matter and nutrients, which allows them to be more productive.

The organisms that inhabit a soil significantly influence the development and the turnover time of nutrients, and the same is true for canopy soils. Macro-organisms such as mites and maggots can consume organic material and break it down in their digestive tracts, aiding in the mixing and formation of soil. Microorganisms such as bacteria and fungi essentially serve the same purpose, but use different degradation pathways. The presence of these organisms is critical in maintaining the nutrient cycles within the soil, and make available the necessary nutrients for the growth of epiphytes and the micro-ecosystem. The microorganism community found in canopy soils has been found to be distinct, but similar to the communities found in the soil of the forest floor.

== Distribution and evolution ==
Vascular epiphytes represent in total about 9% of all vascular plants in the world, but are much more common in tropical areas. This under-representation of vascular epiphyte diversity is still being disputed, but likely pertains to a few abiotic factors including cooler temperatures, moisture availability, and glacial history. The distributions of epiphytes when pertaining to the Northern and Southern hemispheres is extremely asymmetric. The temperate zones in the southern hemisphere have a much greater abundance of vascular epiphytes than in the northern hemisphere, and they persist further into more polar latitudes. This suggests that abiotic factors such as temperature are far less influential than the glacial history of the region. During the Last Glacial Maximum, about 27,000 years ago, much of the area now occupied by temperate rainforests in the northern hemisphere was covered by extensive ice sheets that removed all life. In contrast, temperate rainforests in the southern hemisphere remained largely ice-free. This strongly favored ecosystems in the southern hemisphere, and allowed many more species of obligate, vascular epiphytes to evolve and occupy a particular niche. The intimate relationship that vascular epiphytes have with the formation of canopy soils means that the distributions of canopy soils follow a parallel distribution pattern, as it is the pattern of growth and decay of epiphytic growth that promotes the formation of canopy soils.

The presence of certain types of epiphytes could be considered ecosystem engineers, as they can form new canopy soils within an upper story in forest. For example, Fascicularia bicolor is a species of epiphyte in South American temperate rainforests, and belongs to a group known as trash basket epiphytes. These form extensive mats that capture falling organic matter and accumulate it, promoting the formation of canopy soils. These mats regulate the temperature and humidity of the surrounding canopy, and alter the species diversity of epiphytic growth, which should classify them as an ecosystem engineer.

== Canopy soils and nitrogen cycle ==
Canopy soils are involved in biogeochemical cycling, specifically nitrogen cycling. The nitrogen cycling process observed in canopy soils not only contributes heavily to growth within the canopy, but can also affect the fertility of soil on the forest floor. The rate at which canopy soils release nitrogen is higher than that of forest floors, likely meaning canopy soils are a main siphon of nitrogen for epiphytes within a canopy. However, canopy soils' rate of gross nitrification is around the same or even lower compared to that of forest floor soil. This could be due to the higher acidity measured in canopy soils than observed in forest floor soils.

The nitrogen cycling process that occurs within canopy soils is an important source of nitrogen for epiphytes throughout different elevations. The same way that epiphytes and canopy soils share a symbiotic relationship, forest floor soils and canopy soils are also reliant on one another. Decreasing nutrient availability in the forest floor soil can harm canopy soil proliferation. Nitrogen gas fixation within canopy soils is tied closely with environmental variation as a whole, but specifically, this process is dependent on seasonal changes in tropical rainforest biomes.

== Conservation and impact ==
Canopy soils play a role in providing habit for a diverse array of plants and animals, forest nutrient cycling and other biogeochemical cycles as well as biodiversity within ecosystems. Epiphyte prevalence and vitality contribute to the impact of these factors. The process by which epiphyte communities develop and proliferate is slow and vulnerable to changes in climate, temperature, and overall disturbances. Abundance of canopy soil is linked to larger trees as these trees provide more canopy for which soil can exist. Larger canopy soil ecosystems, while more abundant, are at higher risk of being affected by both climate change and other natural disruptions as well as human-made interferences.

Canopy soils are challenging to study as they are highly vulnerable to environmental changes. Canopy soil ecosystems disappear at a faster rate they can be studied. This is especially prevalent in old-growth forests. Human disturbance such as logging and climate change are leading contributors to the degradation of canopy soils and respective forests they occupy.

Old-growth forests in general and those with greater amounts of epiphytic activity have higher levels of biodiversity, species richness, and abundance of organisms compared to that of secondary forests. Considering that canopy soil proliferation is dependent upon healthy epiphyte development, threats to epiphyte vitality harm canopy soil ecosystems. Epiphyte populations are extremely vulnerable to a variety of changes within the climate. For example, epiphytes have been found to obtain a considerable amount of their diet from sources in the atmosphere. When atmospheric changes occur, epiphytes struggle to persist due to a lack of suitable nutrients. Epiphyte deterioration negatively affects canopy soil life as well as ecosystem function. Epiphytes act as a food and water resource for many animals that live in canopy soil ecosystems while also providing habitat.
