= Epibiont =

Organism that lives on surface of another living organism

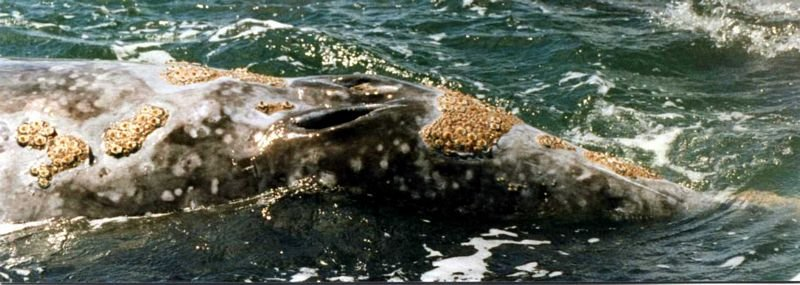
The blowholes of a gray whale, with barnacle epibionts

An epibiont (from the Ancient Greek meaning "living on top of") is an organism that lives on the surface of another living organism, called the basibiont ("living underneath"). The interaction between the two organisms is called epibiosis. An epibiont is, by definition, harmless to its host. In this sense, the interaction between the two organisms can be considered neutralistic or commensalistic; as opposed to being, for example, parasitic, in which case one organism benefits at the expense of the other, or mutualistic, in which both organisms obtain some explicit benefit from their coexistence. These organisms have evolved various adaptations to exploit their hosts for protection, transportation, or access to resources. Examples of common epibionts are bacteria, barnacles, remoras, and algae, many of which live on the surfaces of larger marine organisms such as whales, sharks, sea turtles, and mangrove trees.

Although there is no direct effect of the epibiont to the host, there are often indirect effects resulting from this interaction and change in the surface of the host. This has been found to be especially important to marine organisms and aquatic ecosystems, as surface qualities do impact necessary ecological functions such as drag, radiation absorption, nutrient uptake, etc.

== Types ==
- Epiphytes are plants that grow on the surface of other plants.
- Epizoic organisms are those that live on the surface of animals.

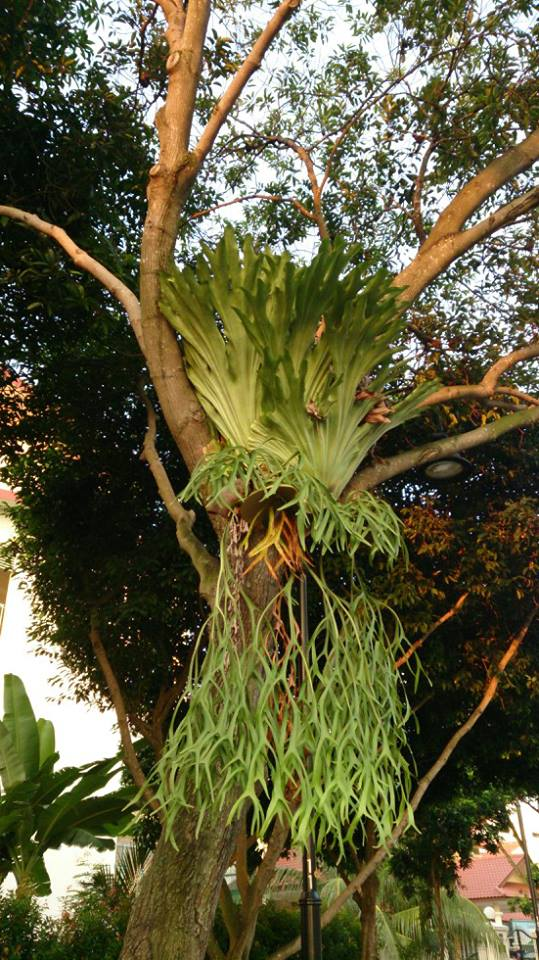
A staghorn fern growing on the trunk of a tree

== Adaptations ==
- Barnacles attach via a secreted polyprotein complex that can bind to underwater surfaces.
- Remoras attach to their basibionts using a suction disk with parallel pectinated lamellae

== Epibionts and their basibiont ==
- Epibiont: Korshikoviella gracilipes, Basibiont: Daphnia pulicaria
- Epibiont: Deltaproteobacteria, Basibiont: "Candidatus Desulfobulbus rimicarensis"

=== Further examples ===
==== Pagurus bernhardus and its epibionts ====
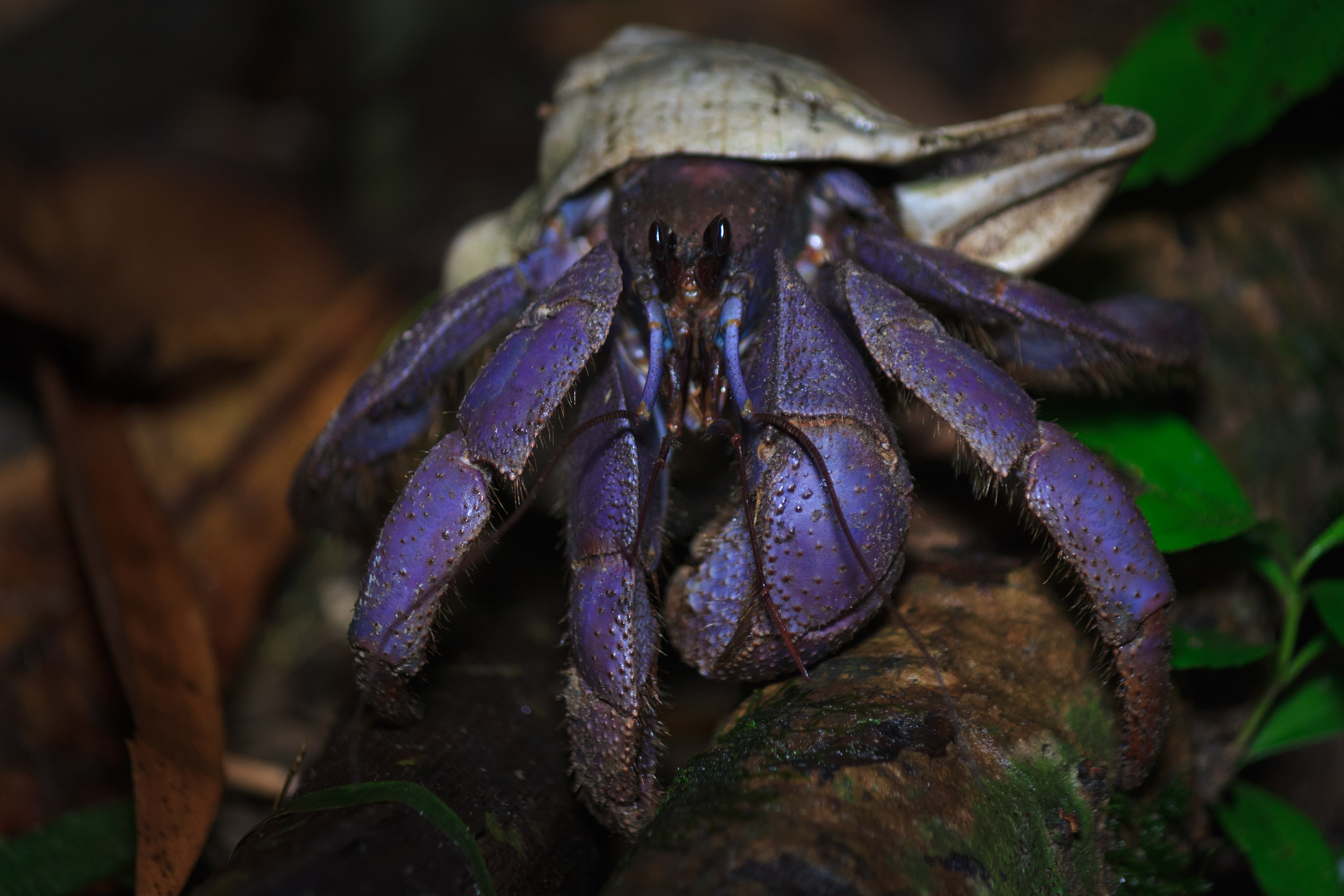
Pagurus bernhardus foraging at night.

P. bernhardus, or hermit crabs, acts as basibionts to many species of varying protozoa, hydrozoa, entoprocts, cirripeds, and polychaetes. The different types of epibionts are found on either the crab, the shell, or both the crab and the shell. In a study done over the course of two years, densities and diversity of epibionts were measured and considered. Multiple studies have found that P. bernardus in shells colonized with epibionts were likely to survive longer in laboratory settings when attacked by predators.

== See also ==
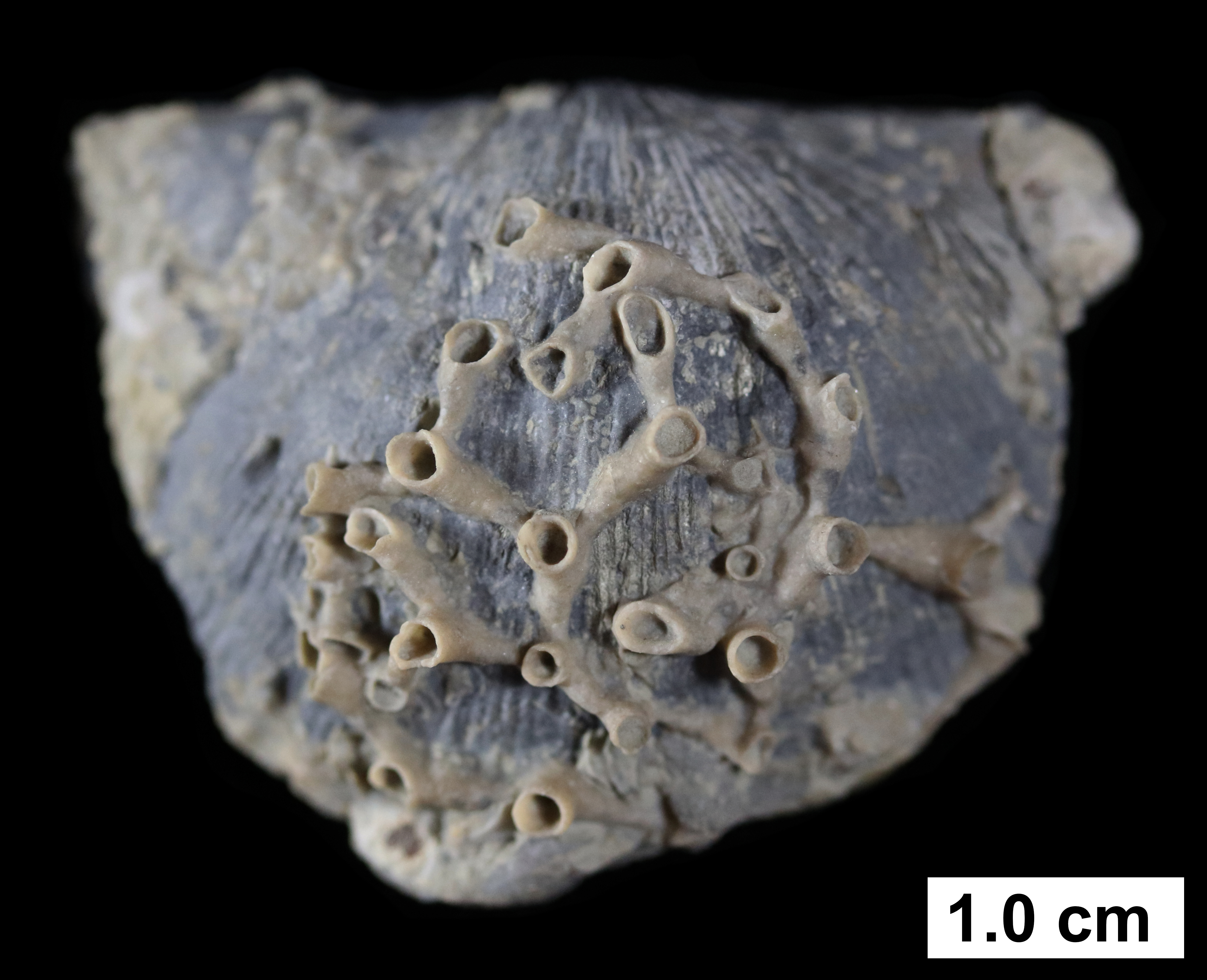
The tabulate coral Aulopora attached to the brachiopod Strophodonta, from the Middle Devonian of Wisconsin

- Epilith – Plants that grow on rocks
- Zoochory – Movement or transport of seeds away from the parent plant
- Epiphyte – Surface organism that grows upon another plant but is not nourished by it
- Ectosymbiont – Symbiosis in which the symbiont lives on the body surface of the host
- Endosymbiont – Organism that lives within the body or cells of another organism
- Epiphytic bacteria
- Epiphytic fungus – Fungus that grows on, or attached to, a living plant
