= Nepenthes misoolensis =

Scientific classification
- Kingdom: Plantae
- Clade: Tracheophytes
- Clade: Angiosperms
- Clade: Eudicots
- Order: Caryophyllales
- Family: Nepenthaceae
- Genus: Nepenthes
- Species: N. misoolensis

Binomial name
- Nepenthes misoolensis Golos, S.McPherson, Primaldhi, Suska & Tjiasm., 2022

Species of pitcher plant from Indonesia

Nepenthes misoolensis is a tropical pitcher plant endemic to Misool Island, in the Rajah Ampat Archipelago, in Southwest Papua, Indonesia.

== Distribution ==
The species is known to occur in Misool Island. The species was found in a karst, at an elevation range of 2 to 4 meters above sea level.

== Etymology ==
The species is named from the contraction of "Misool", the type locality, and the Latin ending "-ensis" which means "from", meaning "from Misool", within which the species is apparently endemic.
