= Pseudomonas mosselii =

Scientific classification
- Domain: Bacteria
- Kingdom: Pseudomonadati
- Phylum: Pseudomonadota
- Class: Gammaproteobacteria
- Order: Pseudomonadales
- Family: Pseudomonadaceae
- Genus: Pseudomonas
- Species: P. mosselii

Binomial name
- Pseudomonas mosselii Dabboussi, et al. 2002

Type strain
- ATCC BAA-99 CFML 90-83; CIP 105259

Species of bacterium

Pseudomonas mosselii is a Gram-negative, rod-shaped, bacterium clinically isolated in France. Based on 16S rRNA analysis, P. mosselii has been placed in the P. putida group.
