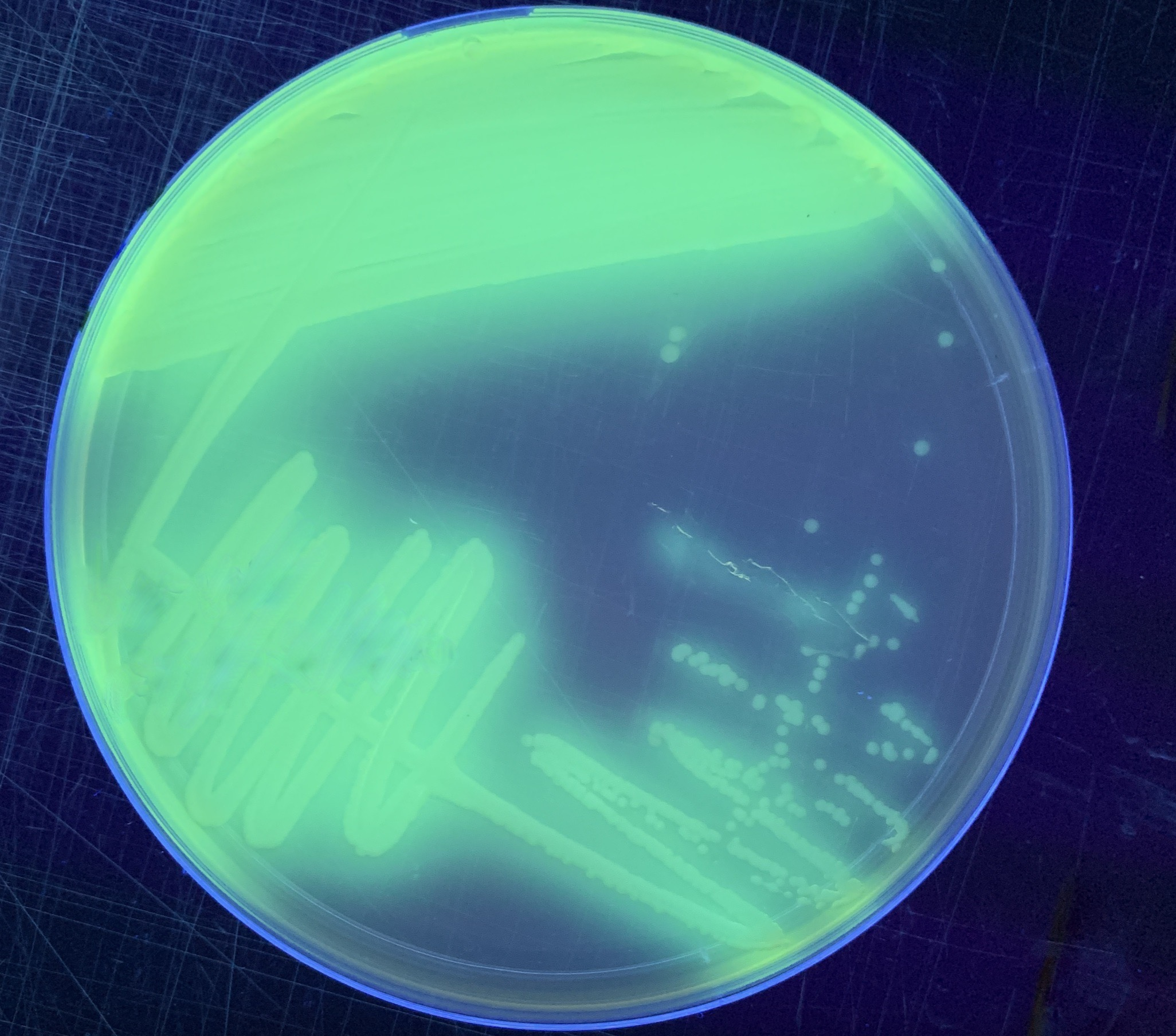
- Pseudomonas putida on King's B agar. Pyoverdine, produced to collect iron from the environment, glows under UV light.
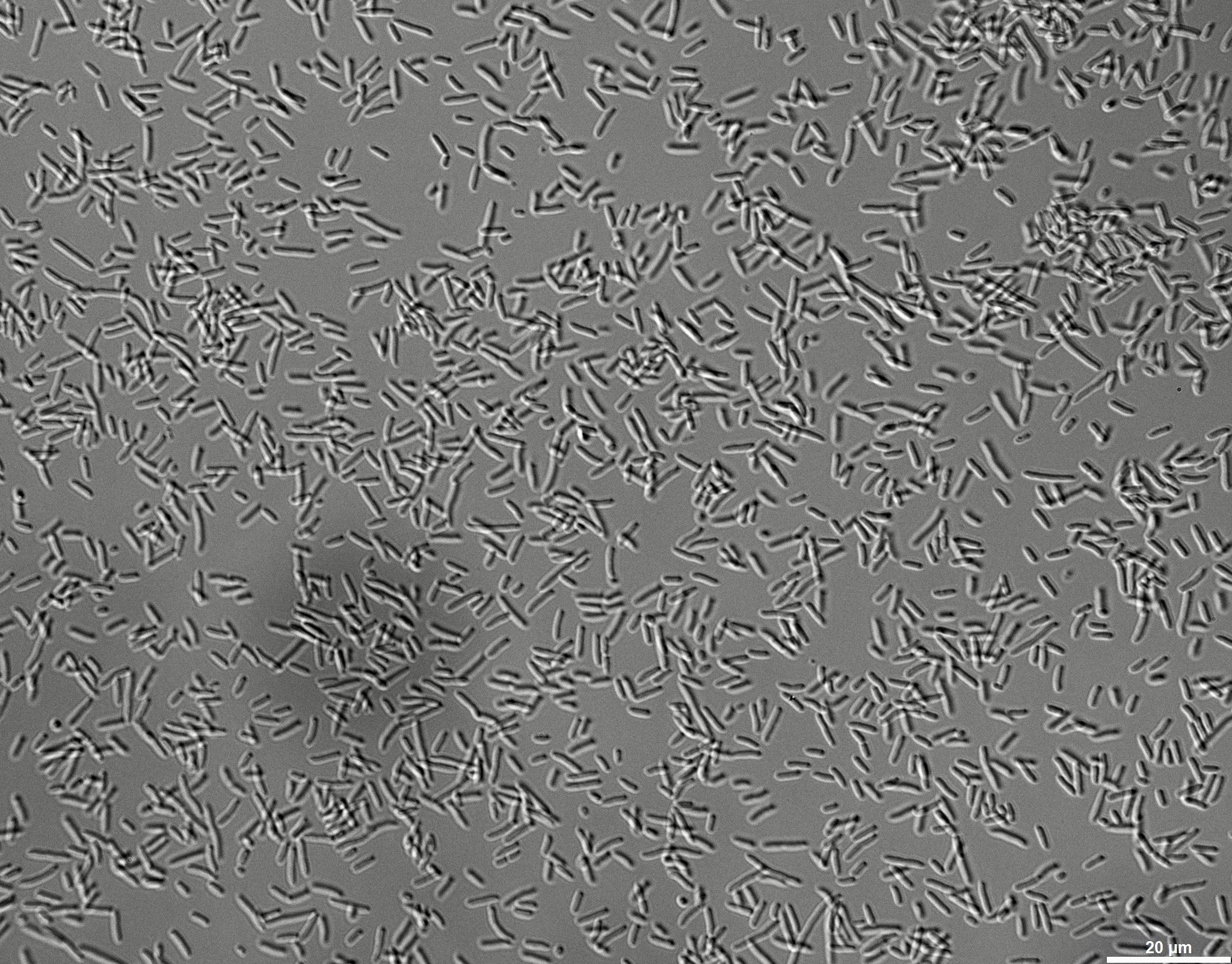
- DIC image of Pseudomonas putida culture wet mount, 400X

Scientific classification
- Domain: Bacteria
- Kingdom: Pseudomonadati
- Phylum: Pseudomonadota
- Class: Gammaproteobacteria
- Order: Pseudomonadales
- Family: Pseudomonadaceae
- Genus: Pseudomonas
- Species: P. putida

Binomial name
- Pseudomonas putida Trevisan, 1889

Type strain
- ATCC 12633 CCUG 12690; CFBP 2066; DSM 291; HAMBI 7 JCM 13063 and 20120; LMG 2257; NBRC 14164; NCAIM B.01634; NCCB 72006 and 68020; NCTC 10936

Synonyms
- Bacillus fluorescens putidus" Flügge 1886; Bacillus putidus Trevisan 1889; Pseudomonas eisenbergii Migula 1900; Pseudomonas convexa Chester 1901; Pseudomonas incognita Chester 1901; Pseudomonas ovalis Chester 1901; Pseudomonas rugosa (Wright 1895) Chester 1901; Pseudomonas striata Chester 1901; Pseudomonas mildenbergii Bergey, et al. Arthrobacter siderocapsulatus Dubinina and Zhdanov 1975; Pseudomonas arvilla O. Hayaishi; Pseudomonas barkeri Rhodes; Pseudomonas cyanogena Hammer

= Pseudomonas putida =

Species of bacterium

Pseudomonas putida is a Gram-negative, rod-shaped, saprophytic soil bacterium. It has a versatile metabolism and is amenable to genetic manipulation, making it a common organism used in research, bioremediation, and synthesis of chemicals and other compounds.

The Food and Drug Administration (FDA) has listed P. putida strain KT2440 as Host-vector system safety level 1 certified (HV-1), indicating that it is safe to use without any extra precautions. Thus, use of P. putida in many research labs is preferable to some other Pseudomonas species, such as Pseudomonas aeruginosa, for example, which is an opportunistic pathogen.

== History and phylogeny ==
Based on 16S rRNA analysis, P. putida was taxonomically confirmed to be a Pseudomonas species (sensu stricto) and placed, along with several other species, in the P. putida group, to which it lends its name. However, phylogenomic analysis of complete genomes from the entire Pseudomonas genus clearly showed that the genomes that were named as P. putida did not form a monophyletic clade, but were dispersed and formed a wider evolutionary group (the putida group) that included other species as well, such as P. alkylphenolia, P. alloputida, P. monteilii, P. cremoricolorata, P. fulva, P. parafulva, P. entomophila, P. mosselii, P. plecoglossicida and several genomic species (new species which are not validly defined).

A variety of P. putida, called multiplasmid hydrocarbon-degrading Pseudomonas, is the first patented organism in the world. Because it is a living organism, the patent was disputed and brought before the United States Supreme Court in the historic court case Diamond v. Chakrabarty, which the inventor, Ananda Mohan Chakrabarty, won. It demonstrates a very diverse metabolism, including the ability to degrade organic solvents such as toluene. This ability has been put to use in bioremediation, or the use of microorganisms to degrade environmental pollutants.

== Genomics ==
The protein count and GC content of the (63) genomes that belong to the P. putida wider evolutionary group (as defined by a phylogenomic analysis of 494 complete genomes from the entire Pseudomonas genus) ranges between 3748–6780 (average: 5197) and between 58.7–64.4% (average: 62.3%), respectively. The core proteome of the analyzed 63 genomes (of the P. putida group) comprised 1724 proteins, of which only 1 core protein was specific for this group, meaning that it was absent in all other analyzed Pseudomonads.

== Repair and avoidance of DNA damage ==
The P. putida genome specifies enzymes that repair oxidative DNA damages (oxidized guanine) during the stationary phase of growth thus avoiding mutagenesis. Enzymes that participate in the removal of oxidized guanine in carbon-starved P. putida DNA include MutY glycosylase and MutM glycosylase. P. putida also specifies the enzyme MutT, a pyrophosphohydrolase that converts 8-oxodGTP to 8-oxodGMP in order to prevent 8-oxodGTP from being used as a substrate by the replicative DNA polymerase.

== Motility ==
Swimming pattern of P. putida: it can swimm in push, pull and wrapped mode.

Pseudomonas putida possesses a bundle of several helical flagella located at one pole of the cell, whose rotation enables the bacterium to swim. Similar to the peritrichously flagellated Escherichia coli, whose flagella are distributed over the entire cell surface, P. putida alternates between periods of straight swimming phases and non-motile phases during which it can change its swimming direction. Unlike E. coli, the flagellar of P. putida can adopt different configurations during swimming. The cells can move in either a “push” or “pull” mode, and the flagellar bundle can also be wrapped around the cell body.

== Uses ==
=== Bioremediation ===
The diverse metabolism of wild-type strains of P. putida may be exploited for bioremediation; for example, it has been shown in the laboratory to function as a soil inoculant to remedy naphthalene-contaminated soils.

Pseudomonas putida is capable of converting styrene oil into the biodegradable plastic PHA. This may be of use in the effective recycling of polystyrene foam, otherwise thought to be not biodegradable.

=== Biocontrol ===
Pseudomonas putida has demonstrated potential biocontrol properties, as an effective antagonist of plant pathogens such as Pythium aphanidermatum and Fusarium oxysporum f.sp. radicis-lycopersici.

=== Oligonucleotide usage signatures of the P. alloputida KT2440 genome ===
Di- to pentanucleotide usage and the list of the most abundant octa- to tetradecanucleotides are useful measures of the bacterial genomic signature. The P. putida KT2440 chromosome is characterized by strand symmetry and intrastrand parity of complementary oligonucleotides. Each tetranucleotide occurs with similar frequency on the two strands. Tetranucleotide usage is biased by G+C content and physicochemical constraints such as base stacking energy, dinucleotide propeller twist angle, or trinucleotide bendability. The 105 regions with atypical oligonucleotide composition can be differentiated by their patterns of oligonucleotide usage into categories of horizontally acquired gene islands, multidomain genes or ancient regions such as genes for ribosomal proteins and RNAs. A species-specific extragenic palindromic sequence is the most common repeat in the genome that can be exploited for the typing of P. putida strains. In the coding sequence of P. putida, LLL is the most abundant tripeptide. Phylogenomic analysis reclassified the strain KT2440 in a new species Pseudomonas alloputida.

=== Organic synthesis ===
Pseudomonas putida's amenability to genetic manipulation has allowed it to be used in the synthesis of numerous organic pharmaceutical and agricultural compounds from various substrates. A new all-inclusive plasmid for P. putida KT2440, was introduced in 2024. This broad host range plasmid (pBBR1MCS2) enables fast iterative genome editing. The method is based on the instability of the vector plasmid combined with the CRISPR/Cas9 system. By manipulating the conditions to be optimal for curing, P. putida is able to cure the vector within 8h. This is significantly faster than with previous methods and this cuts the duration of one edit down to 1.5 days from 4-5 days. Curing speed is relevant because it directly effects when the next edit can take place.

=== CBB5 and caffeine consumption ===
Pseudomonas putida CBB5, a nonengineered, wild-type variety found in soil, can live on caffeine and has been observed to break caffeine down into carbon dioxide and ammonia.
