= Butyrate fermentation =

Process that produces butyric acid

Butyrate fermentation is a process that produces butyric acid via anaerobic bacteria. This process occurs commonly in clostridia which can be isolated from many anaerobic environments such as mud, fermented foods, and intestinal tracts or feces. Clostridium can ferment carbohydrates into butyric acid, producing byproducts including hydrogen gas, carbon dioxide, and acetate. Butyrate fermentation is currently being utilized in the production of a variety of biochemicals and biofuels.

Butyrate in humans originates from the anaerobic microbes that ferment dietary fibers in the lower intestinal tract. Butyrate plays an important role in immune and inflammatory responses, as well as the formation of the intestinal barrier. The presence of short-chain fatty acids lowers the pH of the gut allowing optimal growth for butyrate-producing bacteria. The two major metabolic pathways used for butyrate fermentation are butyryl-CoA phosphorylation and acetate CoA transferase.

== Microbial Biosynthesis ==
One pathway for butyrate biosynthesis. Relevant enzymes: acetoacetyl-CoA thiolase, NAD- and NADP-dependent 3-hydroxybutyryl-CoA dehydrogenase, 3-hydroxybutyryl-CoA dehydratase, and NAD-dependent butyryl-CoA dehydrogenase.

Butyrate is produced by several fermentation processes performed by obligate anaerobic bacteria. This fermentation pathway was discovered by Louis Pasteur in 1861. Examples of butyrate-producing species of bacteria include:

- Clostridium butyricum
- Clostridium kluyveri
- Clostridium pasteurianum
- Faecalibacterium prausnitzii
- Fusobacterium nucleatum
- Butyrivibrio fibrisolvens
- Eubacterium limosum

The pathway starts with the glycolytic cleavage of glucose to two molecules of pyruvate, as happens in most organisms. Pyruvate is oxidized into acetyl coenzyme A catalyzed by pyruvate:ferredoxin oxidoreductase. Two molecules of carbon dioxide (CO_{2}) and two molecules of hydrogen (H_{2}) are formed as waste products. Subsequently, ATP is produced in the last step of the fermentation. Three molecules of ATP are produced for each glucose molecule, a relatively high yield. The balanced equation for this fermentation is

C_{6}H_{12}O_{6} → C_{4}H_{8}O_{2} + 2CO_{2} + 2H_{2}

Other pathways to butyrate include succinate reduction and crotonate disproportionation.

Action	Responsible enzyme
Acetyl coenzyme A converts into acetoacetyl coenzyme A	acetyl-CoA-acetyl transferase
Acetoacetyl coenzyme A converts into β-hydroxybutyryl CoA	β-hydroxybutyryl-CoA dehydrogenase
β-hydroxybutyryl CoA converts into crotonyl CoA	crotonase
Crotonyl CoA converts into butyryl CoA (CH_{3}CH_{2}CH_{2}C=O−CoA)	butyryl CoA dehydrogenase
A phosphate group replaces CoA to form butyryl phosphate	phosphobutyrylase
The phosphate group joins ADP to form ATP and butyrate	butyrate kinase

Several species form acetone and n-butanol in an alternative pathway, which starts as butyrate fermentation. Some of these species are:

- Clostridium acetobutylicum, the most prominent acetone and butanol producer, used also in industry
- Clostridium beijerinckii
- Clostridium tetanomorphum
- Clostridium aurantibutyricum

These bacteria begin with butyrate fermentation, as described above, but, when the pH drops below 5, they switch into butanol and acetone production to prevent further lowering of the pH. Two molecules of butanol are formed for each molecule of acetone.

The change in the pathway occurs after acetoacetyl CoA formation. This intermediate then takes two possible pathways:

- acetoacetyl CoA → acetoacetate → acetone
- acetoacetyl CoA → butyryl CoA → butyraldehyde → butanol

Butyrate can be produced by dietary fibers through two different metabolic pathways. The first metabolic pathway is, butyryl-CoA is phosphorylated to form butyryl-phosphorylated to form butyryl-phosphate and transformed to butyrate via butyrate kinase. The second pathway, the CoA part of butyryl-CoA is transferred to acetate via butyryl-CoA: acetate CoA-transferase, leading to the formation of butyrate and acetyl-CoA. These metabolic pathways are how the butyrate is produced.

== Applications for Commercial Use ==
For commercial purposes Clostridium species are used preferably for butyric acid or butanol production. Butyric acid that is produced via butyrate fermentation is a common food additive and found within products including butter, milk, cheese, and vegetable oils. Some species within the genus Clostridium are capable of producing biochemicals and biofuels. This fermentation process is able to produce acetone, butanol, and ethanol and is one of the first commercial fermentation processes used for bulk chemical production. This species has also been used in therapy, research, and even cosmetics (such as perfumes). It has also been applied to bioprocesses such as in the manufacturing of yogurt, with the most common species used for probiotics being Clostridium butyricum.

== Roles in Metabolism ==
Butyrate, one of the main products from gut microbial fermentation, plays many metabolic roles in the homeostasis of the human body. Butyrate is found to increase energy expenditure to counteract High Fat Diet (HFD) obesity. This is due to butyrate activating thermogenesis, which is a function in adipose tissue to dispel chemical energy by uncoupling protein to energy usage and body temperature. Butyrate also promotes fatty acid oxidation and decreases HFD-induced triglycerides elevation and reduces the respiratory exchange ratio. In metabolic disorders, such as obesity and diabetes, there is a dysfunction in glucose homeostasis due to the decrease in insulin sensitivity and pancreatic β cell dysfunction, which can lead to reduced insulin secretion. Butyrate is shown to help the regulation of glucose homeostasis by improving pancreatic β cell development and improving insulin sensitivity. It is also shown that children with β cell autoimmunity, there is a low abundance of butyrate-producing intestinal bacteria.

== Inflammation of The Gut ==
When butyrate is present in the intestine, IFN-γ, TNF-α, IL-6, and IL-8 are inhibited. These are proinflammatory cytokines which increase inflammation and can cause tissue destruction. Butyrate is also capable of inducing IL-10 and TGF-β which are anti-inflammatory cytokines. Short-chain fatty acids are capable of modifying neutrophil recruitment, which improves immune response. This shows clinical significance in inflammatory bowel disease due to its chronic inflammatory nature. In inflammatory bowel disease, it is seen that there is a reduction of butyrate-producing bacteria which greatly diminishes the defense mechanisms of the mucosal barrier of the gut.
