= Butyrate—acetoacetate CoA-transferase =

Class of enzymes

butyrate-acetoacetate CoA-transferase

Identifiers
- EC no.: 2.8.3.9
- CAS no.: 66231-37-6

Databases
- IntEnz: IntEnz view
- BRENDA: BRENDA entry
- ExPASy: NiceZyme view
- KEGG: KEGG entry
- MetaCyc: metabolic pathway
- PRIAM: profile
- PDB structures: RCSB PDB PDBe PDBsum
- Gene Ontology: AmiGO / QuickGO
Search
- PMC: articles
- PubMed: articles
- NCBI: proteins

In enzymology, a butyrate-acetoacetate CoA-transferase (EC 2.8.3.9) is an enzyme that catalyzes the chemical reaction

butanoyl-CoA + acetoacetate $\rightleftharpoons$ butanoate + acetoacetyl-CoA

Thus, the two substrates of this enzyme are butanoyl-CoA and acetoacetate, whereas its two products are butanoate and acetoacetyl-CoA.

This enzyme belongs to the family of transferases, specifically the CoA-transferases. The systematic name of this enzyme class is butanoyl-CoA:acetoacetate CoA-transferase. Other names in common use include butyryl coenzyme A-acetoacetate coenzyme A-transferase, and butyryl-CoA-acetoacetate CoA-transferase.
