= Phosphate butyryltransferase =

phosphate butyryltransferase

Identifiers
- EC no.: 2.3.1.19
- CAS no.: 9030-01-7

Databases
- IntEnz: IntEnz view
- BRENDA: BRENDA entry
- ExPASy: NiceZyme view
- KEGG: KEGG entry
- MetaCyc: metabolic pathway
- PRIAM: profile
- PDB structures: RCSB PDB PDBe PDBsum
- Gene Ontology: AmiGO / QuickGO
Search
- PMC: articles
- PubMed: articles
- NCBI: proteins

In enzymology, a phosphate butyryltransferase (EC 2.3.1.19) is an enzyme that catalyzes the chemical reaction

butanoyl-CoA + phosphate $\rightleftharpoons$ CoA + butanoyl phosphate

Thus, the two substrates of this enzyme are butanoyl-CoA and phosphate, whereas its two products are CoA and butanoyl phosphate.

This enzyme belongs to the family of transferases, specifically those acyltransferases transferring groups other than aminoacyl groups. The systematic name of this enzyme class is butanoyl-CoA:phosphate butanoyltransferase. This enzyme is also called phosphotransbutyrylase. This enzyme participates in butanoate metabolism.
