= Granule (bacteria) =

Bacterial granules are inclusion bodies within the cytoplasm of bacteria. They can be used to store molecular building blocks, carbon sources, or for energy storage. A common component is poly-β-hydroxybutyric acid or PHB. (Not to be confused with micro-algal granules or aerobic/anaerobic granules).

== Types ==
=== Polyhydroxyalkanoate (PHA) Granules ===
This is a bacterial granular found in most prokaryotes and non-halophilic bacteria. PHA has a wide range of abilities most bacterial granules don't have. Along with using granules to store carbon for energy in periods where nutrients are limited, PHA can be used to protect bacteria against varied osmotic pressures, high and low temperatures, and the ability to resist crystallization due to freezing. PHA also offers UV prevention to bacteria where ultra violet light therapy is used to sterilize objects.

The main focus is how PHA granules are used in the cell rigidity and resistance to osmotic pressures. To test the osmolality, PHA granules like ones in Cupriavidus necator, a non-halophilic bacteria, were subjected to an osmotic process known as up-shock and down-shock. This process is done where the granules were placed in a high saline solution of NaCl. This would place the granules in a hypotonic state, but because these are PHA granules, the cell does not burst. This is the up-shock process. The granules are then flushed with DI water, forcing the granules to become reduced in size as NaCl was replaced with DI water. This process is known as downshock and forces the granules to be hypertonic, but PHA resists shrinkage and holds the bacterial cell in a uniform structure. It was concluded that PHA bacterial granules are more robust than typical energy storing granules. PHA granules also have an increased survivability rate to osmotic imbalance.

==== Polyhydroxybutyrate Granules ====
Polyhydroxybutyrate (PHB) is a form of the above polyhydroxyalkanoate that is common in bacterial granules.

The pathway that forms PHB is:

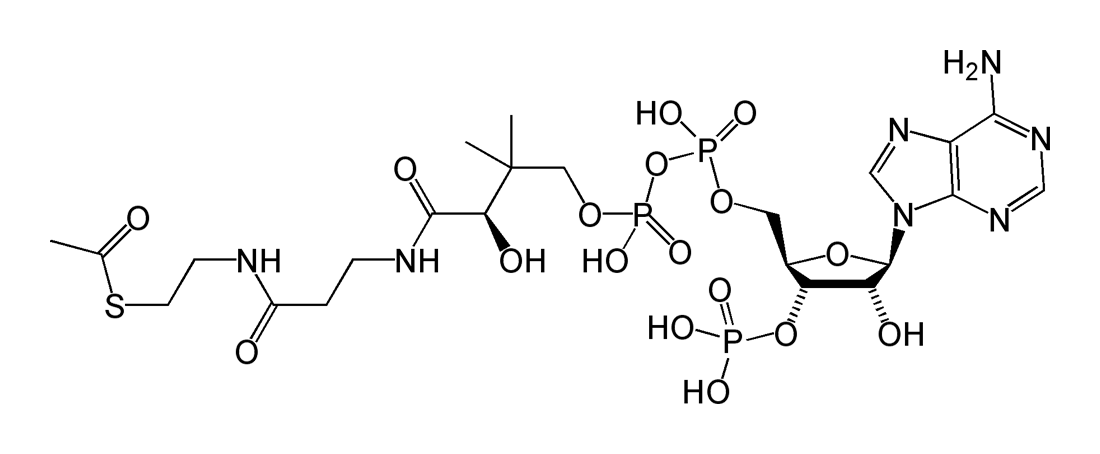
Acetyl-CoA
+
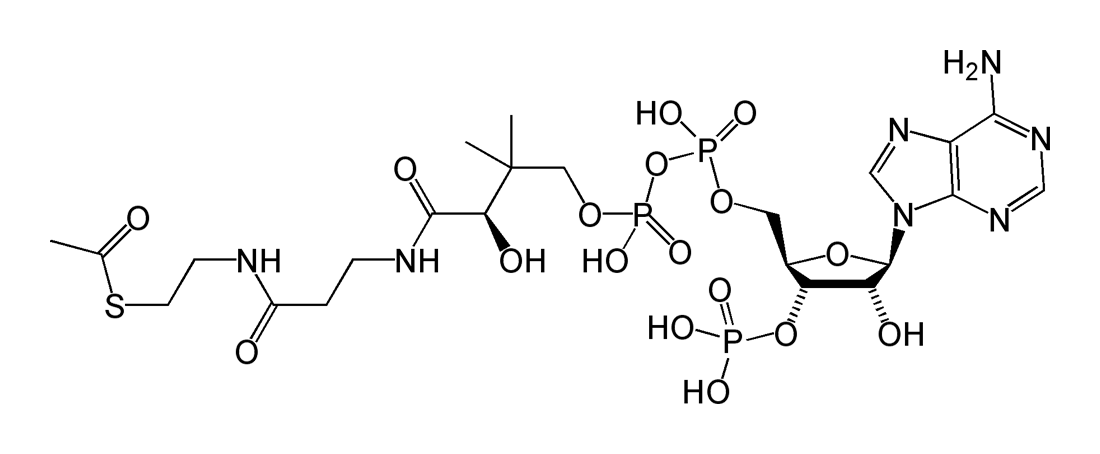
Acetyl-CoA
CoASH
3-ketothiolase

Acetoacetyl-CoA
CoASH
Acetoacetyl-CoA reductase
β-Hydroxybutyryl-CoA
β-Hydroxybutyryl-CoA
CoASH
PHB Synthase

The surface of these granules (200-500 nm in diameter) are surrounded by PGAPs (PHB granule-associated proteins).

The location of these aggregates is explained by three models:

- Micelle Model: PHB synthesis constituents form aggregates like micelles in the cytoplasm randomly.
- Budding model: PHB synthesis enzymes are attached to the membrane and granules form inside the membrane, then releasing into cytoplasm. These would tend to collect near the cytoplasmic membrane.
- Scaffold model: PHB synthesis eznymes are attached to molecules in the cell and collect near where these molecules are located.

=== Stress Granules ===
Stress granules are non-membrane bound structures created to handle response to negative environmental stimuli. Due to this they can be found in almost every kind of bacteria and have a variety of functions. One major function comes in the form of gene regulation. When a viral infection is detected stress granules are formed that isolated the viral genome from translation machinery needed for viral reproduction. Another role include forming plugs when cell wall or membrane damage is detected.

=== Phosphagen Granules ===
Methanospirillum hungatei has granules containing large amounts of aggregated phosphate molecules.

=== Polyphosphate Granules ===
An example in Aneurinibacillus migulanus has granules storing high energy compounds like ATP.

=== Glycogen Granules ===
Glycogen granules act as regulators in a variety of processes, such as triggering proteins that are responsible for metabolism, as well as a mediator for protein-protein interactions that lead to glycolysis.
