= Butyric anhydride =

- Butyric Anhydride

Names
- Preferred IUPAC name Butanoic anhydride
- Other names Butyric anhydride Butanoyl butanoate Butanoic acid anhydride Butyric acid anhydride Butyryl oxide

Identifiers
CAS Number	106-31-0
3D model (JSmol)	Interactive image
ChemSpider	7510
ECHA InfoCard	100.003.077
PubChem CID	7798
UNII	A88LE742VX
CompTox Dashboard (EPA)	DTXSID8026729
- InChI: InChI=1S/C8H14O3/c1-3-5-7(9)11-8(10)6-4-2/h3-6H2,1-2H3 Key: YHASWHZGWUONAO-UHFFFAOYSA-N
- SMILES: CCCC(OC(CCC)=O)=O

Properties
Chemical formula	C_{8}H_{14}O_{3}
Molar mass	158.197 g·mol^{−1}
Appearance	Clear liquid
Density	.967 g/cm^{3}
Melting point	−75 °C (−103 °F; 198 K)
Boiling point	198 °C (388 °F; 471 K)
Refractive index (n_{D})	1.413

Hazards
- Safety data sheet (SDS)

Related compounds
Related acid anhydrides	Acetic anhydride Propionic anhydride Valeric anhydride
Related compounds	Butyric acid Butyryl chloride
- Except where otherwise noted, data are given for materials in their standard state (at 25 °C [77 °F], 100 kPa). verify (what is ?) Infobox references

Butyric anhydride or butanoic anhydride is the chemical compound with the formula (CH_{3}CH_{2}CH_{2}CO)_{2}O. The molecule can be described as a condensation of two molecules of butyric acid with elimination of one water molecule (hence its name).

Butyric anhydride is a clear colorless liquid that smells strongly of butyric acid, which is formed by its reaction to moisture in the air.

== Safety ==
Butyric anhydride is a combustible, corrosive liquid. It is considered water sensitive.
