= Butanal dehydrogenase =

Class of enzymes

butanal dehydrogenase

Identifiers
- EC no.: 1.2.1.57
- CAS no.: 116412-25-0

Databases
- IntEnz: IntEnz view
- BRENDA: BRENDA entry
- ExPASy: NiceZyme view
- KEGG: KEGG entry
- MetaCyc: metabolic pathway
- PRIAM: profile
- PDB structures: RCSB PDB PDBe PDBsum
- Gene Ontology: AmiGO / QuickGO
Search
- PMC: articles
- PubMed: articles
- NCBI: proteins

In enzymology, butanal dehydrogenase (EC 1.2.1.57) is an enzyme that catalyzes the chemical reaction

butyraldehyde
+ Coenzyme A + NAD^{+}
H^{+}
H^{+}
CH_{3}(CH_{2})_{2}COS-CoA + NADH

The three substrates of this enzyme are butyraldehyde, coenzyme A, and oxidised nicotinamide adenine dinucleotide (NAD^{+}). Its products are butyryl-CoA, reduced NADH, and a proton. The enzyme can also use nicotinamide adenine dinucleotide phosphate as its cofactor.

This enzyme belongs to the family of oxidoreductases, specifically those acting on the aldehyde or oxo group of donor with NAD+ or NADP+ as acceptor. The systematic name of this enzyme class is butanal:NAD(P)+ oxidoreductase (CoA-acylating). This enzyme participates in butanoate metabolism.
