= Sodium butyrate =

Names
- Preferred IUPAC name Sodium butanoate
- Other names Sodium butyrate

Identifiers
CAS Number	156-54-7
3D model (JSmol)	Interactive image
ChEBI	CHEBI:64103
ChEMBL	ChEMBL62381
ChemSpider	8727
ECHA InfoCard	100.005.326
PubChem CID	5222465
UNII	8RAS91C36W
CompTox Dashboard (EPA)	DTXSID3037672
- InChI: InChI=1S/C4H8O2.Na/c1-2-3-4(5)6;/h2-3H2,1H3,(H,5,6);/q;+1/p-1
- SMILES: CCCC(=O)[O-].[Na+]

Properties
Chemical formula	CH_{3}CH_{2}CH_{2}COONa
Molar mass	110.088 g·mol^{−1}
- Except where otherwise noted, data are given for materials in their standard state (at 25 °C [77 °F], 100 kPa). verify (what is ?) Infobox references

Sodium butyrate is a compound with formula CH_{3}CH_{2}CH_{2}COO^{−}Na^{+}. It is the sodium salt of butyric acid. It is a white, water-soluble, crystalline solid having the odor of butyric acid.

== Occurrence ==
Sodium butyrate is a common source of butyrate which forms when butyric acid is dissolved near neutral pH. Butyrate is a common metabolite that is produced by hydrolysis of butyryl-CoA.

== Medical research ==
Butyrate affects histone deacetylase, which is tied to DNA processing. Sodium butyrate is under preliminary research for its potential to mitigate traveler's diarrhea.
