= Butyrate kinase =

Class of enzymes

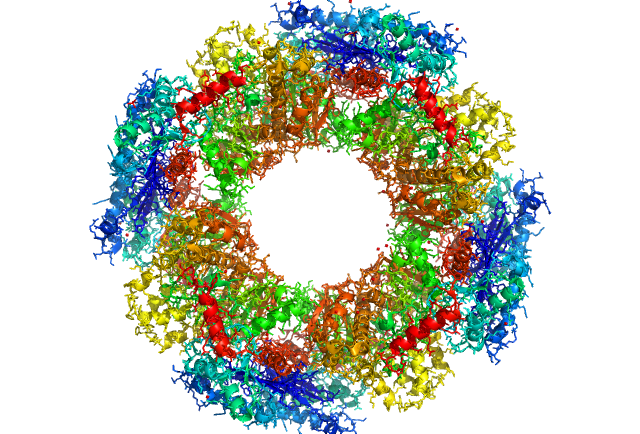
- Butyrate kinase as an octomer.

Identifiers
- EC no.: 2.7.2.7
- CAS no.: 37278-14-1

Databases
- IntEnz: IntEnz view
- BRENDA: BRENDA entry
- ExPASy: NiceZyme view
- KEGG: KEGG entry
- MetaCyc: metabolic pathway
- PRIAM: profile
- PDB structures: RCSB PDB PDBe PDBsum
- Gene Ontology: AmiGO / QuickGO
Search
- PMC: articles
- PubMed: articles
- NCBI: proteins

In enzymology, a butyrate kinase (EC 2.7.2.7) is an enzyme that catalyzes the chemical reaction

ADP + butyryl-phosphate $\rightleftharpoons$ ATP + butyrate

Thus, the two substrates of this enzyme are ADP and butyryl-phosphate, whereas its two products are ATP and butyrate.

This enzyme belongs to the family of transferases, specifically those transferring phosphorus-containing groups (phosphotransferases) with a carboxy group as acceptor. The systematic name of this enzyme class is ATP:butanoate 1-phosphotransferase. This enzyme participates in butyrate metabolism.

This enzyme is transcribed from the gene buk, which is part of the ASKHA super family.

== Mechanism ==
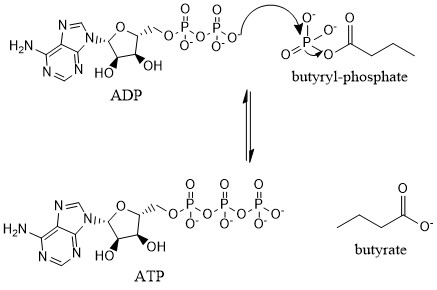
Mechanism for butyrate kinase

ADP + butyryl-phosphate $\rightleftharpoons$ ATP + butyrate

The reaction above is a nucleophilic substitution reaction. An electron pair from an oxygen on ADP attacks the phosphorus on butyryl-phosphate, breaking the bond between phosphorus and oxygen to create ATP and butyrate. The arrow-pushing mechanism is shown above.

The reaction can also occur in the reverse direction, as shown below, under certain fermentation conditions.

ATP + butyrate $\rightleftharpoons$ ADP + butyryl-phosphate

== Structure ==
As of 2015, two structures have been solved for this class of enzymes, with PDB accession codes 1SAZ and 1X9J. The study conducted to solve 1SAZ was retracted in 2012 due to fact that the data was used without the permission of the sole custodian.

The investigators of the study that produced the crystallization of 1X9J hypothesized that the enzyme was an octomer formed from dimers. The crystallized form has a radius of 7.5 nm which corresponded to a molecular weight of 380 kDa. Because a monomer of buk2 is about 43 kDa, it was believed that the enzyme itself was either an octomer or a nonamer. Investigators hypothesized that the enzyme was an octomer since most of the proteins within the ASHKA super family form dimers.

== Function ==
Butyrate kinase is active within the human colon. To form butyrate, two molecules of acetyl-CoA are combined and reduced to produce butyryl-CoA. Butyryl CoA is then converted into butyrate through two reactions. The first reaction converts butyryl-CoA to butyryl-phosphate by using the phosphotransbutyrylase enzyme. Butyryl-phosphate is then converted into butyrate by using butyrate kinase and in the process, releases ATP.

Butyrate plays an important role within cells as it affects cellular proliferation, differentiation, and apoptosis.

Because of the significant roles that butyrate plays within cells, it is essential that butyrate kinase is functioning correctly, which can be done through regulation of the enzyme. One study has previously found that butyrate kinase is not regulated by its end-products or other acids such as acetic acid, but more studies need to be conducted to further elucidate the regulation of butyrate kinase.

== Disease relevance ==
As stated in the previous section, butyrate is involved with multiple cellular functions. Because of its involvement with these functions, it is hypothesized that butyrate can act as a protective agent against colon cancer and various inflammatory bowel diseases. Butyrate plays a key role in colon cancer by switching its role concerning cellular proliferation and apoptosis depending on the state and conditions of the cell. Butyrate also possesses anti-inflammatory effects to decrease colonic inflammation such as ulcerative colitis. One study specifically identified the transcription factor NF-kB as a target of butyrate to decrease the number of pro-inflammatory cytokines.
