= CA1 =

CA1, CA-1, CA 1, or Ca.1 may refer to:

== Aircraft and other vehicles ==
- Buhl CA-1 Airster, an American sports airplane
- CA-1 Europa, a German unmanned fighter aircraft
- Caproni Ca.1 (1910), an experimental biplane of 1910
- Caproni Ca.1 (1914), a World War I bomber
- Schneider CA1, the first French tank

== Biology ==
- CA1 (gene), a human gene
- CA1, a hippocampal subfield

== Law ==
- United States Court of Appeals for the First Circuit

== Places and roads ==
- the road designation for the Central American Highway 1 (CA-1), the portion of the Pan-American Highway passing through the Central American countries
- California State Route 1

== Politics ==
- California's 1st congressional district
