= Β-Hydroxybutyryl-CoA =

β-Hydroxybutyryl-CoA

Names
- IUPAC name {[(2R,3S,4R,5R)-5-(6-amino-9H-purin-9-yl)-4-hydroxy-2-({[hydroxy({hydroxy[(3R)-3-hydroxy-3-({2-[(2-{[(3R)-3-hydroxybutanoyl]sulfanyl}ethyl)carbamoyl]ethyl}carbamoyl)-2,2-dimethylpropoxy]phosphoryl}oxy)phosphoryl]oxy}methyl)oxolan-3-yl]oxy}phosphonic acid

Identifiers
CAS Number	2871-66-1
3D model (JSmol)	Interactive image
ChEBI	CHEBI:37050
ChemSpider	559120
DrugBank	DB03612
KEGG	C05116
PubChem CID	644065
CompTox Dashboard (EPA)	DTXSID90951355
- InChI: InChI=1/C25H42N7O18P3S/c1-13(33)8-16(35)54-7-6-27-15(34)4-5-28-23(38)20(37)25(2,3)10-47-53(44,45)50-52(42,43)46-9-14-19(49-51(39,40)41)18(36)24(48-14)32-12-31-17-21(26)29-11-30-22(17)32/h11-14,18-20,24,33,36-37H,4-10H2,1-3H3,(H,27,34)(H,28,38)(H,42,43)(H,44,45)(H2,26,29,30)(H2,39,40,41)/t13-,14-,18-,19-,20?,24-/m1/s1 Key: QHHKKMYHDBRONY-JYMPOPDUBN
- SMILES: CC(CC(=O)SCCNC(=O)CCNC(=O)[C@@H](C(C)(C)COP(=O)(O)OP(=O)(O)OC[C@@H]1[C@H]([C@H]([C@@H](O1)N2C=NC3=C(N=CN=C32)N)O)OP(=O)(O)O)O)O

Properties
Chemical formula	C_{25}H_{42}N_{7}O_{18}P_{3}S
Molar mass	853.625 g/mol
- Except where otherwise noted, data are given for materials in their standard state (at 25 °C [77 °F], 100 kPa). verify (what is ?) Infobox references

β-Hydroxybutyryl-CoA (or 3-hydroxybutyryl-coenzyme A) is an intermediate in the fermentation of butyric acid, and in the metabolism of lysine and tryptophan. The L-3-hydroxybutyl-CoA (or (S)-3-hydroxybutanoyl-CoA) enantiomer is also the second to last intermediate in beta oxidation of even-numbered, straight chain, and saturated fatty acids.

== See also ==
- Crotonyl-coenzyme A
- Acetoacetyl CoA
- Beta-hydroxybutyryl-CoA dehydrogenase
- 3-hydroxybutyryl-CoA dehydratase
