= Butyric acid =

Chemical compound (CH3CH2CH2COOH)

Skeletal structure of butyric acid
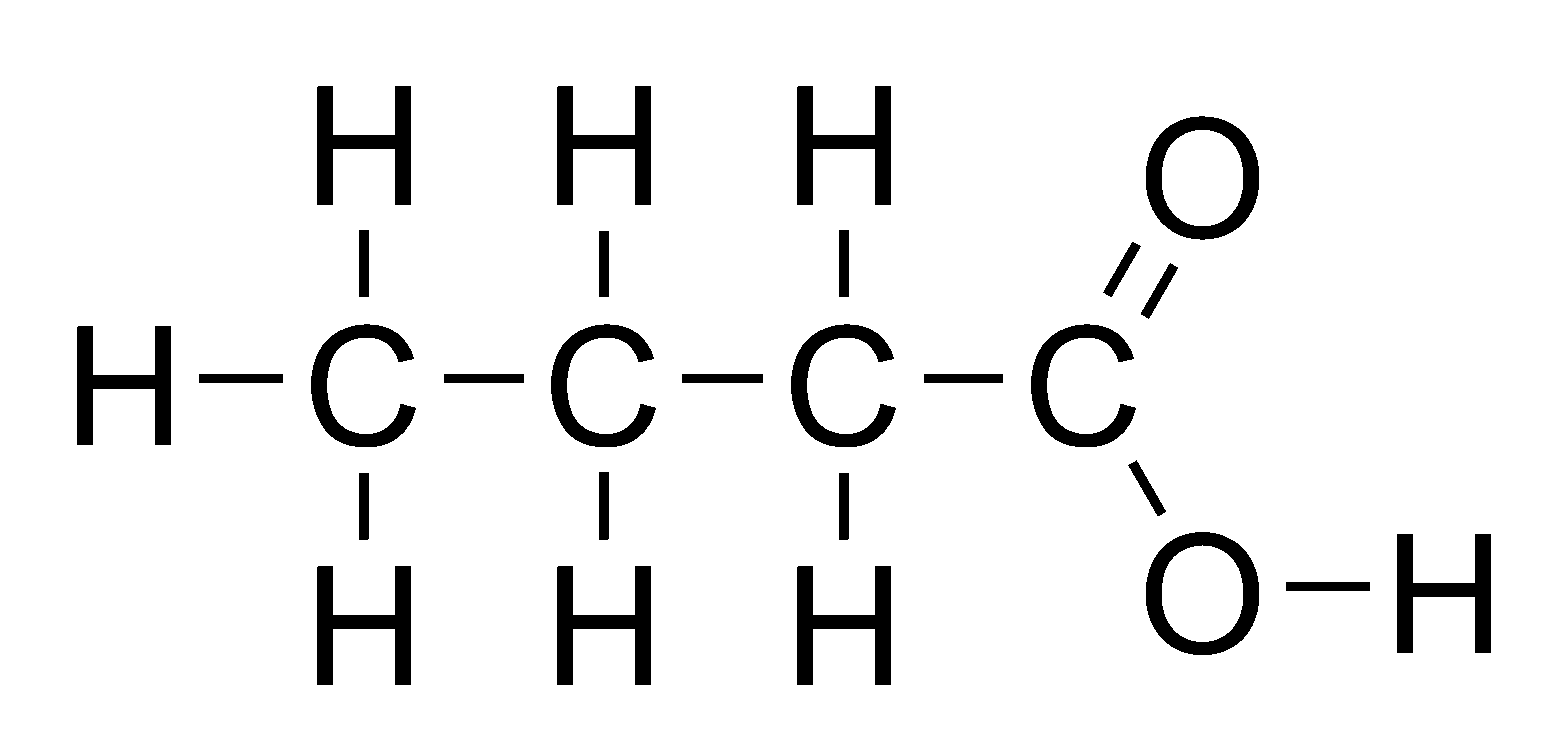
Flat structure of butyric acid
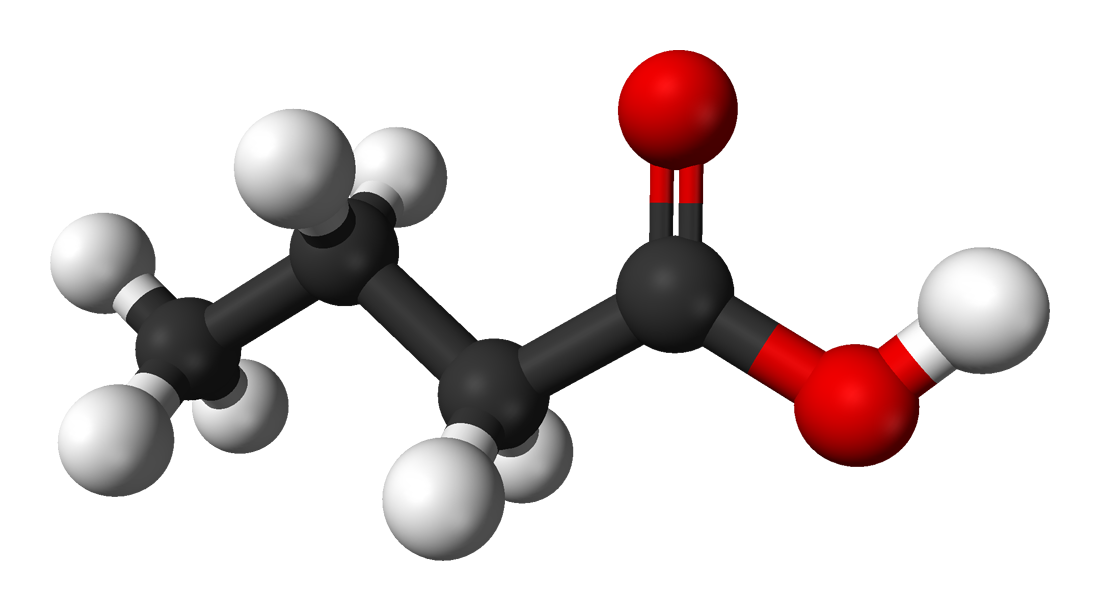
- Space filling model of butyric acid

Names
- Preferred IUPAC name Butanoic acid
- Other names Ethylacetic acid 1-Propanecarboxylic acid Propylformic acid C4:0 (Lipid numbers)

Identifiers
CAS Number	Butyric acid: 107-92-6; Butyrate: 461-55-2
3D model (JSmol)	Butyric acid: Interactive image
ChEBI	Butyric acid: CHEBI:30772
ChEMBL	Butyric acid: ChEMBL14227
ChemSpider	Butyric acid: 259; Butyrate: 94582
DrugBank	Butyric acid: DB03568
ECHA InfoCard	100.003.212
EC Number	Butyric acid: 203-532-3
IUPHAR/BPS	Butyric acid: 1059
KEGG	Butyric acid: C00246
MeSH	Butyric+acid
PubChem CID	Butyric acid: 264; Butyrate: 104775
RTECS number	Butyric acid: ES5425000
UNII	Butyric acid: 40UIR9Q29H
UN number	2820
CompTox Dashboard (EPA)	Butyric acid: DTXSID8021515
- InChI: InChI=1S/C4H8O2/c1-2-3-4(5)6/h2-3H2,1H3,(H,5,6) Key: FERIUCNNQQJTOY-UHFFFAOYSA-N; Butyric acid: InChI=1/C4H8O2/c1-2-3-4(5)6/h2-3H2,1H3,(H,5,6) Key: FERIUCNNQQJTOY-UHFFFAOYAP
- SMILES: Butyric acid: O=C(O)CCC

Properties
Chemical formula	C_{3}H_{7}COOH
Molar mass	88.106 g·mol^{−1}
Appearance	Colorless liquid
Odor	Unpleasant, similar to vomit or body odor
Density	1.135 g/cm^{3} (−43 °C); 0.9528 g/cm^{3} (25 °C)
Melting point	−5.1 °C (22.8 °F; 268.0 K)
Boiling point	163.75 °C (326.75 °F; 436.90 K)
Sublimation conditions	Sublimes at −35 °C; Δ_{subl}H^{~~o~~} = 76 kJ/mol
Solubility in water	Miscible
Solubility	Miscible with ethanol, ether. Slightly soluble in CCl_{4}
log P	0.79
Vapor pressure	0.112 kPa (20 °C); 0.74 kPa (50 °C); 9.62 kPa (100 °C)
Henry's law constant (k_{H})	5.35·10^{−4} L·atm/mol
Acidity (pK_{a})	4.82
Magnetic susceptibility (χ)	−55.10·10^{−6} cm^{3}/mol
Thermal conductivity	1.46·10^{5} W/m·K
Refractive index (n_{D})	1.398 (20 °C)
Viscosity	1.814 cP (15 °C); 1.426 cP (25 °C)

Structure
Crystal structure	Monoclinic (−43 °C)
Space group	C2/m
Lattice constant	a = 8.01 Å, b = 6.82 Å, c = 10.14 Å α = 90°, β = 111.45°, γ = 90°
Dipole moment	0.93 D (20 °C)

Thermochemistry
Heat capacity (C)	178.6 J/mol·K
Std molar entropy (S^{⦵}_{298})	222.2 J/mol·K
Std enthalpy of formation (Δ_{f}H^{⦵}_{298})	−533.9 kJ/mol
Std enthalpy of combustion (Δ_{c}H^{⦵}_{298})	2183.5 kJ/mol

Hazards
- GHS labelling
Pictograms	(GHS05: Corrosive)
Signal word	Danger
Hazard statements	H314
Precautionary statements	P280, P305+P351+P338, P310
NFPA 704 (fire diamond)	3 2 0
Flash point	71 to 72 °C (160 to 162 °F; 344 to 345 K)
Autoignition temperature	440 °C (824 °F; 713 K)
Explosive limits	2.2–13.4%
- Lethal dose or concentration (LD, LC)
LD_{50} (median dose)	2000 mg/kg (oral, rat)
Safety data sheet (SDS)	External MSDS

Related compounds
Related carboxylic acids	Propionic acid, Pentanoic acid
Related compounds	1-Butanol; Butyraldehyde; Methyl butyrate
- Except where otherwise noted, data are given for materials in their standard state (at 25 °C [77 °F], 100 kPa). Infobox references

Butyric acid (/bjuːˈtɪrɪk/; from Ancient Greek: βούτῡρον, meaning "butter"), also known under the systematic name butanoic acid, is a straight-chain alkyl fatty acid with the chemical formula CH_{3}CH_{2}CH_{2}COOH. It is an oily, colorless liquid with an unpleasant odor. Isobutyric acid (2-methylpropanoic acid) is an isomer. Salts and esters of butyric acid are known as butyrates or butanoates. The acid itself does not occur widely in nature, but its esters are widespread. It is a common industrial chemical and an important component in the mammalian gut.

== History ==
Butyric acid was first observed in an impure form in 1814 by the French chemist Michel Eugène Chevreul. By 1818, he had purified it sufficiently to characterize it. However, Chevreul did not publish his early research on butyric acid; instead, he deposited his findings in manuscript form with the secretary of the Academy of Sciences in Paris, France. Henri Braconnot, another French chemist, was also researching the composition of butter and was publishing his findings and this led to disputes about priority. As early as 1815, Chevreul claimed that he had found the substance responsible for the smell of butter. By 1817, he published some of his findings regarding the properties of butyric acid and named it. However, it was not until 1823 that he presented the properties of butyric acid in detail. The name butyric acid comes from βούτῡρον, meaning "butter", the substance in which it was first found. The Latin name butyrum (or buturum) is similar.

== Occurrence ==
Tributyrin, the triglyceride of butyric acid, makes up 3 to 4% of butter. When butter goes rancid, butyric acid is liberated from the glyceride by hydrolysis. It is one of the fatty acid subgroup called short-chain fatty acids. Butyric acid is a typical carboxylic acid that reacts with bases and affects many metals. It is found in animal fat and plant oils, bovine milk, papaya, breast milk, butter, parmesan cheese, body odor, and vomit as a product of anaerobic fermentation (including in the colon). It has a taste somewhat like butter and an unpleasant odor. Mammals with good scent detection abilities, such as dogs, can detect it at 10 parts per billion, whereas humans can detect it only in concentrations above 10 parts per million. In food manufacturing, it is used as a flavoring agent.

In humans, butyric acid is one of two primary endogenous agonists of human hydroxycarboxylic acid receptor 2 (HCA_{2}), a G_{i/o}-coupled G protein-coupled receptor.

Butyric acid is present as its octyl ester in parsnip (Pastinaca sativa) and in the seed of the ginkgo tree.

== Production ==
=== Industrial ===
In industry, butyric acid is produced by hydroformylation from propene and syngas, forming butyraldehyde, which is oxidised to the final product.

H_{2} + CO + CH_{3}CH=CH_{2} → CH_{3}CH_{2}CH_{2}CHObutyric acid

It can be separated from aqueous solutions by saturation with salts such as calcium chloride. The calcium salt, Ca(C_{4}H_{7}O_{2})_{2} · H_{2}O, is less soluble in hot water than in cold.

=== Microbial biosynthesis ===
One pathway for butyrate biosynthesis. Relevant enzymes: acetoacetyl-CoA thiolase, NAD- and NADP-dependent 3-hydroxybutyryl-CoA dehydrogenase, 3-hydroxybutyryl-CoA dehydratase, and NAD-dependent butyryl-CoA dehydrogenase.

Butyrate is produced by several fermentation processes performed by obligate anaerobic bacteria. This fermentation pathway was discovered by Louis Pasteur in 1861. Examples of butyrate-producing species of bacteria:

- Clostridium butyricum
- Clostridium kluyveri
- Clostridium pasteurianum
- Faecalibacterium prausnitzii
- Fusobacterium nucleatum
- Butyrivibrio fibrisolvens
- Eubacterium limosum

The pathway starts with the glycolytic cleavage of glucose to two molecules of pyruvate, as happens in most organisms. Pyruvate is oxidized into acetyl coenzyme A catalyzed by pyruvate:ferredoxin oxidoreductase. Two molecules of carbon dioxide (CO_{2}) and two molecules of hydrogen (H_{2}) are formed as waste products. Subsequently, ATP is produced in the last step of the fermentation. Three molecules of ATP are produced for each glucose molecule, a relatively high yield. The balanced equation for this fermentation is

C_{6}H_{12}O_{6} → C_{4}H_{8}O_{2} + 2CO_{2} + 2H_{2}

Other pathways to butyrate include succinate reduction and crotonate disproportionation.

Action	Responsible enzyme
Acetyl coenzyme A converts into acetoacetyl coenzyme A	acetyl-CoA-acetyl transferase
Acetoacetyl coenzyme A converts into β-hydroxybutyryl CoA	β-hydroxybutyryl-CoA dehydrogenase
β-hydroxybutyryl CoA converts into crotonyl CoA	crotonase
Crotonyl CoA converts into butyryl CoA (CH_{3}CH_{2}CH_{2}C=O−CoA)	butyryl CoA dehydrogenase
A phosphate group replaces CoA to form butyryl phosphate	phosphobutyrylase
The phosphate group joins ADP to form ATP and butyrate	butyrate kinase

Several species form acetone and n-butanol in an alternative pathway, which starts as butyrate fermentation. Some of these species are:

- Clostridium acetobutylicum, the most prominent acetone and butanol producer, used also in industry
- Clostridium beijerinckii
- Clostridium tetanomorphum
- Clostridium aurantibutyricum

These bacteria begin with butyrate fermentation, as described above, but, when the pH drops below 5, they switch into butanol and acetone production to prevent further lowering of the pH. Two molecules of butanol are formed for each molecule of acetone.

The change in the pathway occurs after acetoacetyl CoA formation. This intermediate then takes two possible pathways:

- acetoacetyl CoA → acetoacetate → acetone
- acetoacetyl CoA → butyryl CoA → butyraldehyde → butanol

For commercial purposes Clostridium species are used preferably for butyric acid or butanol production. The most common species used for probiotics is the Clostridium butyricum.

=== Fermentable fiber sources ===
Highly-fermentable fiber residues, such as those from resistant starch, oat bran, pectin, and guar are transformed by colonic bacteria into short-chain fatty acids (SCFA) including butyrate, producing more SCFA than less fermentable fibers such as celluloses. One study found that resistant starch consistently produces more butyrate than other types of dietary fiber. The production of SCFA from fibers in ruminant animals such as cattle is responsible for the butyrate content of milk and butter.

Fructans are another source of prebiotic soluble dietary fibers which can be digested to produce butyrate. They are often found in the soluble fibers of foods which are high in sulfur, such as the allium and cruciferous vegetables. Sources of fructans include wheat (although some wheat strains such as spelt contain lower amounts), rye, barley, onion, garlic, Jerusalem and globe artichoke, asparagus, beetroot, chicory, dandelion leaves, leek, radicchio, the white part of spring onion, broccoli, brussels sprouts, cabbage, fennel, and prebiotics, such as fructooligosaccharides (FOS), oligofructose, and inulin.

Dietary patterns strongly influence colonic butyrate production, as certain foods contain high levels of fermentable fibres that are preferentially metabolized by butyrate-producing bacteria. Resistant starch–rich foods such as cooked-and-cooled potatoes, rice, and legumes substantially increase luminal butyrate concentrations compared with lower-fermentability fibres. Soluble fibres found in oats, barley β-glucans, pectin-rich fruits (apples, citrus), and guar gum similarly enhance microbial butyrate formation.

== Chemical reactions ==
Butyric acid reacts as a typical carboxylic acid: it can form amide, ester, anhydride, and chloride derivatives. The latter, butyryl chloride, is commonly used as the intermediate to obtain the others.

== Uses ==
Butyric acid is used in the preparation of various butyrate esters. It is used to produce cellulose acetate butyrate (CAB), which is used in a wide variety of tools, paints, and coatings, and is more resistant to degradation than cellulose acetate. CAB can degrade with exposure to heat and moisture, releasing butyric acid.

Low-molecular-weight esters of butyric acid, such as methyl butyrate, have mostly pleasant aromas or tastes. As a consequence, they are used as food and perfume additives. It is an approved food flavoring in the EU FLAVIS database (number 08.005).

Due to its powerful odor, it has also been used as a fishing bait additive. Many of the commercially available flavors used in carp (Cyprinus carpio) baits use butyric acid as their ester base. It is not clear whether fish are attracted by the butyric acid itself or the substances added to it. Butyric acid was one of the few organic acids shown to be palatable for both tench and bitterling.

The substance has been used as a stink bomb by the Sea Shepherd Conservation Society to disrupt Japanese whaling crews. The Dutch branch of Extinction Rebellion has used it as a chemical agent in a clothing store; several people who became unwell were treated on site by an ambulance crew.

Sodium butyrate has been found to be effective in the prevention of traveler's diarrhea.

== Pharmacology ==
Human enzyme and GPCR binding
Inhibited enzyme	IC_{50} (nM)	Entry note
HDAC1	16,000	
HDAC2	12,000	
HDAC3	9,000	
HDAC4	2,000,000	Lower bound
HDAC5	2,000,000	Lower bound
HDAC6	2,000,000	Lower bound
HDAC7	2,000,000	Lower bound
HDAC8	15,000	
HDAC9	2,000,000	Lower bound
CA1	511,000	
CA2	1,032,000	
GPCR target	pEC_{50}	Entry note
FFAR2	2.9–4.6	Full agonist
FFAR3	3.8–4.9	Full agonist
HCA_{2}	2.8	Agonist

=== Pharmacodynamics ===
Butyric acid (pK_{a} 4.82) is fully ionized at physiological pH, so its anion is the material that is mainly relevant in biological systems. It is one of two primary endogenous agonists of human hydroxycarboxylic acid receptor 2 (HCA_{2}, also known as GPR109A), a G_{i/o}-coupled G protein-coupled receptor (GPCR),

Like other short-chain fatty acids (SCFAs), butyrate is an agonist at the free fatty acid receptors FFAR2 and FFAR3, which function as nutrient sensors that facilitate the homeostatic control of energy balance; however, among the group of SCFAs, only butyrate is an agonist of HCA_{2}. It is also an HDAC inhibitor (specifically, HDAC1, HDAC2, HDAC3, and HDAC8), a drug that inhibits the function of histone deacetylase enzymes, thereby favoring an acetylated state of histones in cells.

=== Pharmacokinetics ===
Butyrate that is produced in the colon through microbial fermentation of dietary fiber is primarily absorbed and metabolized by colonocytes and the liver (Note: Most of the butyrate that is absorbed into blood plasma from the colon enters the circulatory system via the portal vein; most of the butyrate that enters the circulatory system by this route is taken up by the liver.) for the generation of ATP during energy metabolism; however, some butyrate is absorbed in the distal colon, which is not connected to the portal vein, thereby allowing for the systemic distribution of butyrate to multiple organ systems through the circulatory system. Butyrate that has reached systemic circulation can readily cross the blood–brain barrier via monocarboxylate transporters (i.e., certain members of the SLC16A group of transporters). Other transporters that mediate the passage of butyrate across lipid membranes include SLC5A8 (SMCT1), SLC27A1 (FATP1), and SLC27A4 (FATP4).

=== Metabolism ===
Butyric acid is metabolized by various human XM-ligases (ACSM1, ACSM2B, ASCM3, ACSM4, ACSM5, and ACSM6), also known as butyrate–CoA ligase. The metabolite produced by this reaction is butyryl–CoA, and is produced as follows:

Adenosine triphosphate + butyric acid + coenzyme A → adenosine monophosphate + pyrophosphate + butyryl-CoA

As a short-chain fatty acid, butyrate is metabolized by mitochondria as an energy (i.e., adenosine triphosphate or ATP) source through fatty acid metabolism. In particular, it is an important energy source for cells lining the mammalian colon (colonocytes). Without butyrates, colon cells undergo autophagy (i.e., self-digestion) and die.

In humans, the butyrate precursor tributyrin, which is naturally present in butter, is metabolized by triacylglycerol lipase into dibutyrin and butyrate through the reaction:

Tributyrin + H_{2}O → dibutyrin + butyric acid

== Biochemistry ==
Butyrate has numerous effects on energy homeostasis in humans. These effects occur through its metabolism by mitochondria to generate ATP during fatty acid metabolism or through one or more of its histone-modifying enzyme targets (i.e., the class I histone deacetylases) and G-protein coupled receptor targets (i.e., FFAR2, FFAR3, and HCA_{2}).

=== Mammalian gut ===
Butyrate is essential to host immune homeostasis. Although the role and importance of butyrate in the gut is not settled, many researchers argue that a depletion of butyrate-producing bacteria in patients with several vasculitic conditions is essential to the pathogenesis of these disorders. A depletion of butyrate in the gut is typically caused by an absence or depletion of butyrate-producing-bacteria (BPB). This depletion in BPB leads to microbial dysbiosis. This is characterized by an overall low biodiversity and a depletion of key butyrate-producing members. Butyrate is an essential microbial metabolite with a vital role as a modulator of proper immune function in the host. It has been shown that children lacking in BPB are more susceptible to allergic disease and type 1 diabetes. Butyrate is also reduced in a diet low in dietary fiber, which can induce inflammation and have other adverse affects insofar as these short-chain fatty acids activate PPAR-γ.

Decreased butyrate levels lead to a damaged or dysfunctional intestinal epithelial barrier. Butyrate reduction has also been associated with Clostridioides difficile proliferation. Conversely, a high-fiber diet results in higher butyric acid concentration and inhibition of C. difficile growth.

In the gut microbiomes found in the class Mammalia, omnivores and herbivores have butyrate-producing bacterial communities dominated by the butyryl-CoA:acetate CoA-transferase pathway, whereas carnivores have butyrate-producing bacterial communities dominated by the butyrate kinase pathway.

The odor of butyric acid, which emanates from the sebaceous follicles of all mammals, works on ticks as a signal.

=== Immunomodulation ===
Butyrate's effects on the immune system are mediated through the inhibition of class I histone deacetylases and activation of its G-protein coupled receptor targets: HCA_{2} (GPR109A), FFAR2 (GPR43), and FFAR3 (GPR41). Beyond its local effects in the gut, butyrate has been shown to exert systemic immunomodulatory actions in experimental settings. Preclinical studies indicate that butyrate can modulate innate and adaptive immune responses by reducing pro-inflammatory cytokine production, regulating immune cell activation, and preserving epithelial and endothelial barrier function. In models of systemic inflammation, including sepsis, butyrate supplementation has been associated with attenuation of inflammatory responses and organ dysfunction.

=== Colonocytes ===
Responsible for about 70% of energy from the colonocytes, butyric acid is a critical SCFA in colon homeostasis. Short-chain fatty acids, which include butyric acid, are produced by beneficial colonic bacteria that feed on, or ferment prebiotics, supporting colonocytes by increasing energy conversion.

== Butyrate salts and esters ==
Butyrate (butanoate) ion, C_{3}H_{7}CO^{−}_{2}, is the conjugate base of butyric acid. It is found in sodium butyrate, classified as a carboxylate salt. Butyric acid converts to butyrate in aqueous solution near physiological pH. Butyrate also refers to esters of butyric acid, e.g. ethyl butyrate.

=== Examples ===
==== Salts ====
- Calcium butyrate
- Lysine butyrate
- Magnesium butyrate
- Sodium butyrate

==== Esters ====
- Butyl butyrate
- Butyryl-CoA
- Cellulose acetate butyrate (aircraft dope)
- Cholesteryl butyrate
- Estradiol benzoate butyrate
- Ethyl butyrate
- Methyl butyrate
- Pentyl butyrate
- Pivaloyloxymethyl butyrate (Pivanex; AN-9)
- SerBut (seryl-butyrate; O-butyryl-L-serine)
- Tributyrin

== See also ==
- List of saturated fatty acids
- Histone
  - Histone-modifying enzyme
    - Histone acetylase
    - Histone deacetylase
- Hydroxybutyric acids
  - α-Hydroxybutyric acid
  - β-Hydroxybutyric acid
  - γ-Hydroxybutyric acid
- Oxobutyric acids
  - 2-Oxobutyric acid (α-ketobutyric acid)
  - 3-Oxobutyric acid (acetoacetic acid)
  - 4-Oxobutyric acid (succinic semialdehyde)
- β-Methylbutyric acid
  - β-Hydroxy β-methylbutyric acid
