= Phosphoketolase =

Identifiers
- EC no.: 4.1.2.9
- CAS no.: 9031-75-8

Databases
- IntEnz: IntEnz view
- BRENDA: BRENDA entry
- ExPASy: NiceZyme view
- KEGG: KEGG entry
- MetaCyc: metabolic pathway
- PRIAM: profile
- PDB structures: RCSB PDB PDBe PDBsum
- Gene Ontology: AmiGO / QuickGO
Search
- PMC: articles
- PubMed: articles
- NCBI: proteins

The enzyme phosphoketolase(EC 4.1.2.9) catalyzes the chemical reactions

D-xylulose 5-phosphate + phosphate $\rightleftharpoons$ acetyl phosphate + D-glyceraldehyde 3-phosphate + H_{2}O (EC 4.1.2.9)
D-fructose 6-phosphate + phosphate $\rightleftharpoons$ acetyl phosphate + D-erythrose 4-phosphate + H_{2}O (EC 4.1.2.22)
D-sedoheptulose 7-phosphate + phosphate $\rightleftharpoons$ acetyl phosphate + D-ribose 5-phosphate + H_{2}O

Phosphoketolase is considered a promiscuous enzyme because it was demonstrated to use 3 different sugar phosphates as substrates. In a recent genetic study, more than 150 putative phosphoketolase genes exhibiting varying catalytic properties were found in 650 analyzed bacterial genomes.

This enzyme belongs to the family of lyases, specifically the aldehyde-lyases, which cleave carbon-carbon bonds. It participates in 3 metabolic pathways: pentose phosphate pathway, methane metabolism, and carbon fixation. It employs one cofactor, thiamin diphosphate. Phosphoketolase was previously used for biotechnological purposes as it enables the construction of synthetic pathways that allow complete carbon conservation without the generation of reducing power.
