= Short-chain acyl-CoA dehydrogenase =

Class of enzymes

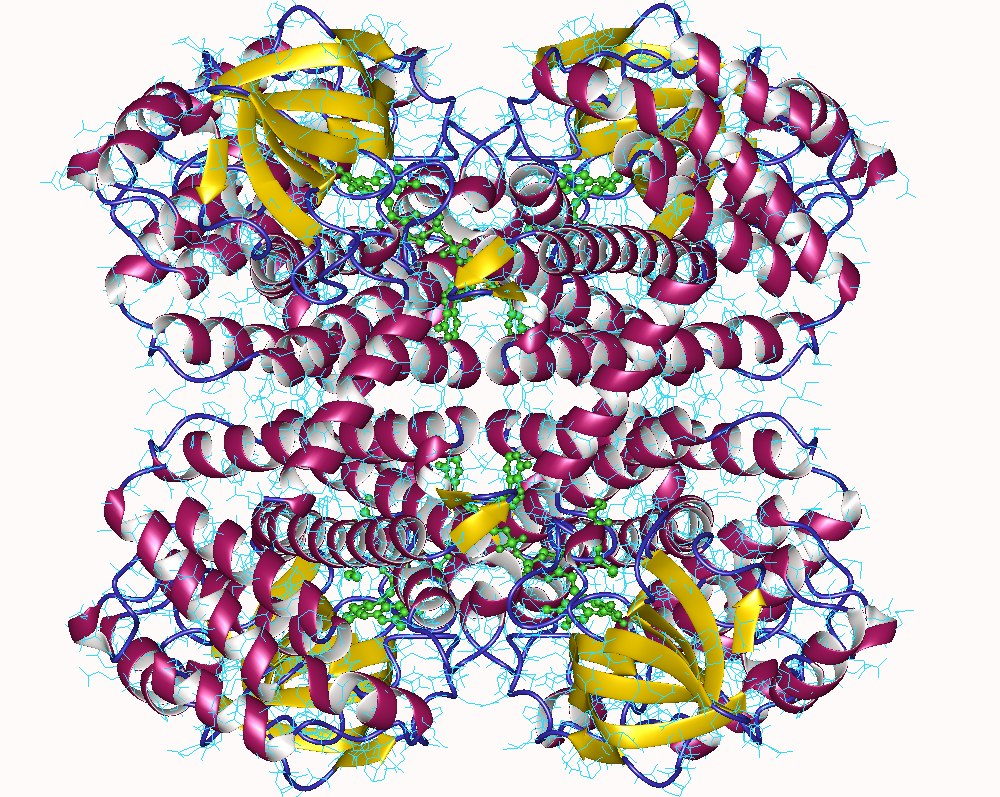
- Short-chain acyl-CoA dehydrogenase tetramer, Human

Identifiers
- EC no.: 1.3.8.1
- CAS no.: 9027-88-7

Databases
- BRENDA: enzyme data
- ExPASy: NiceZyme view
- KEGG: enzyme entry
- MetaCyc: metabolic pathway
- Rhea: reactions
- PDB structures: RCSB PDB PDBe PDBsum
Search
- PMC: articles
- PubMed: articles
- NCBI: proteins

Short-chain acyl-CoA dehydrogenase (EC 1.3.8.1, butyryl-CoA dehydrogenase, butanoyl-CoA dehydrogenase, butyryl dehydrogenase, unsaturated acyl-CoA reductase, ethylene reductase, enoyl-coenzyme A reductase, unsaturated acyl coenzyme A reductase, butyryl coenzyme A dehydrogenase, short-chain acyl CoA dehydrogenase, short-chain acyl-coenzyme A dehydrogenase, 3-hydroxyacyl CoA reductase, butanoyl-CoA:(acceptor) 2,3-oxidoreductase, ACADS (gene).) is an enzyme with systematic name short-chain acyl-CoA:electron-transfer flavoprotein 2,3-oxidoreductase. This enzyme catalyses the following chemical reaction

a short-chain acyl-CoA + electron-transfer flavoprotein $\rightleftharpoons$ a short-chain trans-2,3-dehydroacyl-CoA + reduced electron-transfer flavoprotein

This enzyme contains FAD as prosthetic group.

== See also ==
- Acyl-CoA dehydrogenase
  - Medium-chain acyl-CoA dehydrogenase
- Butyryl-CoA (also known as butanoyl-CoA)
