= Butyryl phosphate =

Names
- Preferred IUPAC name (Butanoyloxy)phosphonic acid
- Other names Butanoyl dihydrogen phosphate

Identifiers
CAS Number	4378-06-7
3D model (JSmol)	Interactive image; Interactive image
ChemSpider	19951180
PubChem CID	266
UNII	6Z2QPF6UPQ
CompTox Dashboard (EPA)	DTXSID80963109
- InChI: InChI=1S/C12H21O7P/c1-4-7-10(13)17-20(16,18-11(14)8-5-2)19-12(15)9-6-3/h4-9H2,1-3H3 Key: SDPAWCIKJKIBPH-UHFFFAOYSA-N; InChI=1/C12H21O7P/c1-4-7-10(13)17-20(16,18-11(14)8-5-2)19-12(15)9-6-3/h4-9H2,1-3H3 Key: SDPAWCIKJKIBPH-UHFFFAOYAF
- SMILES: CCCC(=O)OP(=O)(O)O; O=C(OP(=O)(OC(=O)CCC)OC(=O)CCC)CCC

Properties
Chemical formula	C_{4}H_{9}O_{5}P
Molar mass	168.085 g·mol^{−1}
- Except where otherwise noted, data are given for materials in their standard state (at 25 °C [77 °F], 100 kPa). verify (what is ?) Infobox references

Butyryl phosphate is an intermediate in the fermentation of butyric acid. The glutamate oxidation of butyryl phosphate may provide the main source of energy for Clostridium tetanomorphum.

== See also ==
- Butyric acid
