= Butyryl chloride =

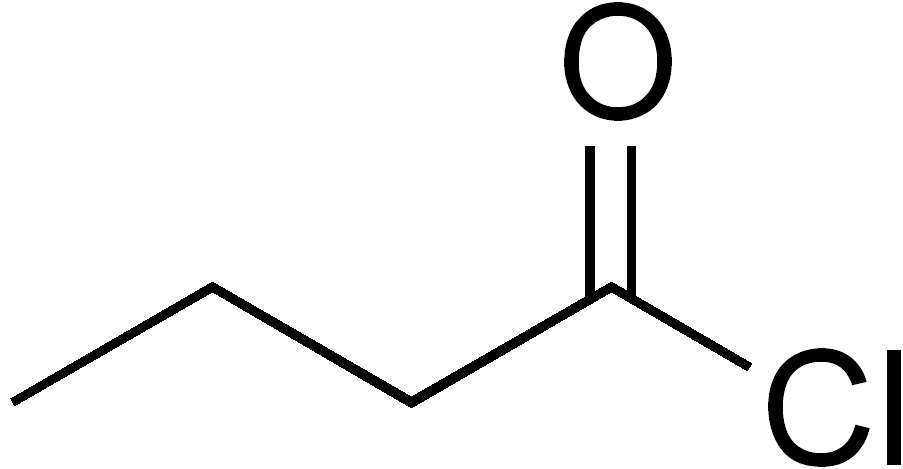

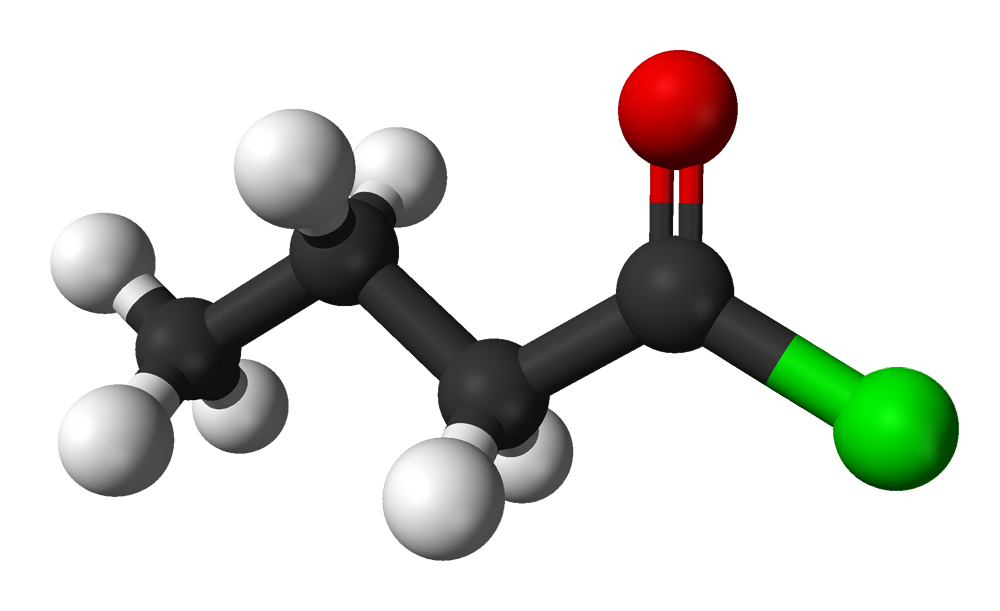
- Ball-and-stick model

Names
- Preferred IUPAC name Butanoyl chloride
- Other names Butyryl chloride n-Butyryl chloride Butanoyl chloride

Identifiers
CAS Number	141-75-3
3D model (JSmol)	Interactive image
ChEMBL	ChEMBL1300263
ChemSpider	8523
ECHA InfoCard	100.004.999
EC Number	205-498-5
PubChem CID	8855
UNII	2XVM8E16IR
UN number	2353
CompTox Dashboard (EPA)	DTXSID5024710
- InChI: InChI=1S/C4H7ClO/c1-2-3-4(5)6/h2-3H2,1H3 Key: DVECBJCOGJRVPX-UHFFFAOYSA-N; InChI=1/C4H7ClO/c1-2-3-4(5)6/h2-3H2,1H3 Key: DVECBJCOGJRVPX-UHFFFAOYAA
- SMILES: ClC(=O)CCC

Properties
Chemical formula	C_{4}H_{7}ClO
Molar mass	106.55 g·mol^{−1}
Appearance	colorless liquid
Odor	pungent
Density	1.033 g/cm^{3}
Melting point	−89 °C (−128 °F; 184 K)
Boiling point	102 °C (216 °F; 375 K)
Solubility in water	decomposition
Solubility	miscible with ether
Magnetic susceptibility (χ)	−62.1·10^{−6} cm^{3}/mol
Refractive index (n_{D})	1.412

Hazards
- Occupational safety and health (OHS/OSH)
Main hazards	Reacts violently with water, flammable, corrosive
- GHS labelling
Pictograms	(GHS02: Flammable) (GHS05: Corrosive)
Signal word	Danger
Hazard statements	H225, H314
Precautionary statements	P210, P233, P240, P241, P242, P243, P260, P264, P280, P301+P330+P331, P303+P361+P353, P304+P340, P305+P351+P338, P310, P321, P363, P370+P378, P403+P235, P405, P501
NFPA 704 (fire diamond)	3 3 2
Flash point	21.7 °C (71.1 °F; 294.8 K)
- Except where otherwise noted, data are given for materials in their standard state (at 25 °C [77 °F], 100 kPa). verify (what is ?) Infobox references

Butyryl chloride is an organic compound with the chemical formula CH_{3}CH_{2}CH_{2}C(O)Cl. It is a colorless liquid with a unpleasant odor. Butyryl chloride is soluble in organic solvents, but it reacts readily with water and alcohols. It is usually produced by chlorination of butyric acid.

== Reactions ==
Like related acyl chlorides, butyryl chloride hydrolyzes readily:

CH_{3}CH_{2}CH_{2}C(O)Cl + H_{2}O → CH_{3}CH_{2}CH_{2}CO_{2}H + HCl

Alcohols react to give esters:

CH_{3}CH_{2}CH_{2}C(O)Cl + ROH → CH_{3}CH_{2}CH_{2}CO_{2}R + HCl

Amines react to give amides:

CH_{3}CH_{2}CH_{2}C(O)Cl + R_{2}NH → CH_{3}CH_{2}CH_{2}C(O)NR_{2} + HCl

Derivatives of butyryl chloride are used in manufacturing pesticides, pharmaceuticals, perfume fixative, polymerization catalyst, and dyestuffs. Butyryl chloride is also commonly used as an intermediate for organic synthesis for the preparation of pharmaceuticals, agrochemicals, dyes, esters, and peroxide compounds.

== Safety ==
Butyryl chloride is flammable and fumes in air, releasing hydrogen chloride.
