= 3-Hydroxybutyryl-CoA dehydrogenase =

Class of enzymes

3-hydroxybutyryl-CoA dehydrogenase
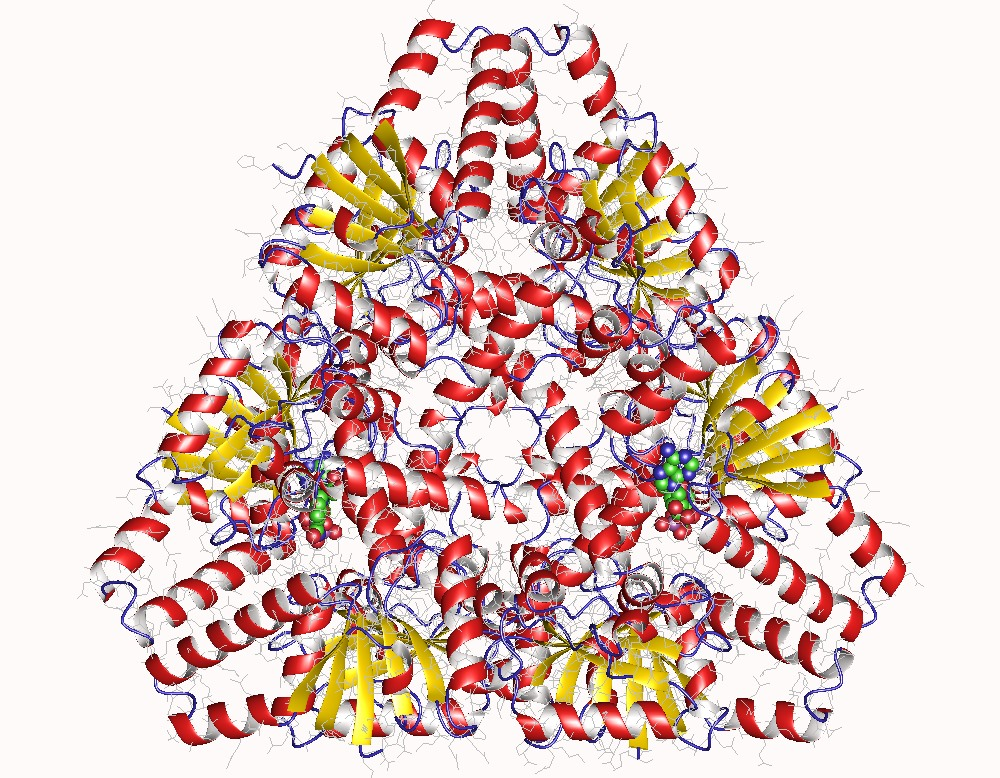
- 3-hydroxybutyryl-CoA dehydrogenase homohexamer, Clostridium acetobutylicum

Identifiers
- EC no.: 1.1.1.157
- CAS no.: 39319-78-3

Databases
- IntEnz: IntEnz view
- BRENDA: BRENDA entry
- ExPASy: NiceZyme view
- KEGG: KEGG entry
- MetaCyc: metabolic pathway
- PRIAM: profile
- PDB structures: RCSB PDB PDBe PDBsum
- Gene Ontology: AmiGO / QuickGO
Search
- PMC: articles
- PubMed: articles
- NCBI: proteins

In enzymology, 3-hydroxybutyryl-CoA dehydrogenase (EC 1.1.1.157) is an enzyme that catalyzes the chemical reaction

β-hydroxybutyryl-CoA
R=CH_{3}
+ NADP^{+}
H^{+}
H^{+}
acetoacetyl-CoA
R=CH_{3}
+ NADPH

The two substrates of this enzyme are β-hydroxybutyryl-CoA and oxidised nicotinamide adenine dinucleotide phosphate (NADP^{+}). Its products are acetoacetyl-CoA, reduced NADPH, and a proton.

This enzyme belongs to the family of oxidoreductases, to be specific those acting on the CH-OH group of donor with NAD^{+} or NADP^{+} as acceptor. The systematic name of this enzyme class is (S)-3-hydroxybutanoyl-CoA:NADP^{+} oxidoreductase. Other names in common use include beta-hydroxybutyryl coenzyme A dehydrogenase, L-(+)-3-hydroxybutyryl-CoA dehydrogenase, BHBD, dehydrogenase, L-3-hydroxybutyryl coenzyme A (nicotinamide adenine, dinucleotide phosphate), L-(+)-3-hydroxybutyryl-CoA dehydrogenase, and beta-hydroxybutyryl-CoA dehydrogenase. This enzyme participates in benzoate degradation via coa ligation and butanoate metabolism.
