= Crotonyl-CoA =

Names
- IUPAC name 3′-O-Phosphonoadenosine 5′-[(3R)-4-({3-[(2-{[(2E)-but-2-enoyl]sulfanyl}ethyl)amino]-3-oxopropyl}amino)-3-hydroxy-2,2-dimethyl-4-oxobutyl dihydrogen diphosphate]
- Systematic IUPAC name [(2R,3S,4R,5R)-5-(6-Amino-9H-purin-9-yl)-4-hydroxy-3-(phosphonooxy)oxolan-2-yl]methyl (3R)-4-({3-[(2-{[(2E)-but-2-enoyl]sulfanyl}ethyl)amino]-3-oxopropyl}amino)-3-hydroxy-2,2-dimethyl-4-oxobutyl dihydrogen diphosphate

Identifiers
CAS Number	992-67-6
3D model (JSmol)	Interactive image
ChemSpider	444072
ECHA InfoCard	100.012.360
MeSH	Crotonyl-coenzyme+A
PubChem CID	592
UNII	Q959BSX9OA
CompTox Dashboard (EPA)	DTXSID30904345
- InChI: InChI=1/C36H46N4O7S2/c1-25(2)24-40(49(45,46)30-19-15-27(4)16-20-30)34(36(42)47-5)12-8-9-21-37-35(41)33(22-28-23-38-32-11-7-6-10-31(28)32)39-48(43,44)29-17-13-26(3)14-18-29/h6-7,10-11,13-20,23,25,33-34,38-39H,8-9,12,21-22,24H2,1-5H3,(H,37,41)/t33-,34-/m0/s1 Key: KDDJMRASDNUVJO-HEVIKAOCBM
- SMILES: CC=CC(=O)SCCNC(=O)CCNC(=O)C(C(C)(C)COP(=O)(O)OP(=O)(O)OCC1C(C(C(O1)N2C=NC3=C(N=CN=C32)N)O)OP(=O)(O)O)O

Properties
Chemical formula	C_{25}H_{40}N_{7}O_{17}P_{3}S
Molar mass	835.609 g/mol
- Except where otherwise noted, data are given for materials in their standard state (at 25 °C [77 °F], 100 kPa). Infobox references

Crotonyl-coenzyme A (crotonyl-CoA) is an intermediate in the fermentation of butyric acid, and in the metabolism of lysine and tryptophan. It is important in the metabolism of fatty acids and amino acids. Crotonyl-CoA is also involved in β-oxidation, where it is formed from butyryl-CoA through the action of acyl-CoA dehydrogenases, linking fatty acid breakdown to cellular energy production.

== Crotonyl-CoA and reductases ==
Before a 2007 report by Alber and coworkers, crotonyl-CoA carboxylases and reductases (CCRs) were known for reducing crotonyl-CoA to butyryl-CoA. A report by Alber and coworkers concluded that a specific CCR homolog was able to reduce crotonyl-CoA to (2S)-ethyl malonyl-CoA which was a favorable reaction. The specific CCR homolog came from the bacterium Rhodobacter sphaeroides. Crotonyl-CoA reductases belong to a broader class of enzymes that catalyze reduction reactions involving coenzyme A thioesters, often contributing to the biosynthesis of complex metabolites in microorganisms. These enzymes are particularly important in metabolic pathways that generate precursors for polyketide synthesis and other secondary metabolites.

== Role of crotonyl-CoA in transcription ==
Post-translational modification of histones either by acetylation or crotonylation is important for the active transcription of genes. Histone crotonylation is regulated by the concentration of crotonyl-CoA which can change based on environmental cell conditions or genetic factors.

== See also ==
- Crotonic acid
- Glutaryl-CoA dehydrogenase
