= Clostridium aurantibutyricum =

Scientific classification
- Domain: Bacteria
- Kingdom: Bacillati
- Phylum: Bacillota
- Class: Clostridia
- Order: Eubacteriales
- Family: Clostridiaceae
- Genus: Clostridium
- Species: C. aurantibutyricum

Binomial name
- Clostridium aurantibutyricum Hellinger 1944

Species of bacterium

Clostridium aurantibutyricum is a species of bacteria in the genus Clostridium.
