= Carbonic anhydrase 1 =

Protein-coding gene in humans

CA1
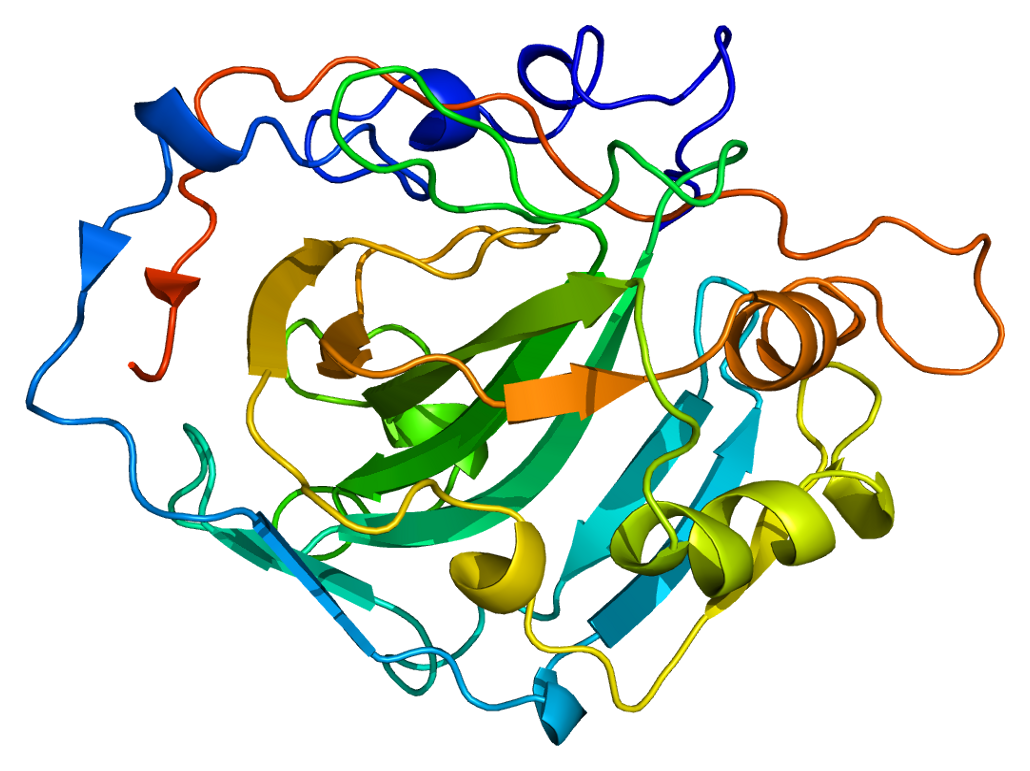

Identifiers
- Aliases: CA1, CA-I, CAB, Car1, HEL-S-11, carbonic anhydrase 1
- External IDs: OMIM: 114800; MGI: 88268; GeneCards: CA1
Available structures
| PDB | Ortholog search: PDBe RCSB |
| PDB | List of PDB id codes 1AZM, 1BZM, 1CRM, 1CZM, 1HCB, 1HUG, 1HUH, 1J9W, 1JV0, 2CAB, 2FOY, 2FW4, 2IT4, 2NMX, 2NN1, 2NN7, 3LXE, 3W6H, 3W6I, 4WR7, 4WUP, 4WUQ |
Enzyme activity
| EC # | BRENDA | ExPASy | KEGG | MetaCyc |
|---|---|---|---|---|
| 4.2.1.1 | ↗ | ↗ | ↗ | ↗ |
| 4.2.1.69 | ↗ | ↗ | ↗ | ↗ |

Gene location (Human)
| Chr. | Chromosome 8 (human) |
| Band | 8q21.2 | Start | 85,327,608 bp |
| Band | 8q21.2 | End | 85,379,014 bp |

Gene location (Mouse)
| Chr. | Chromosome 3 (mouse) |
| Band | 3 A1|3 3.18 cM | Start | 14,831,276 bp |
| Band | 3 A1|3 3.18 cM | End | 14,873,428 bp |
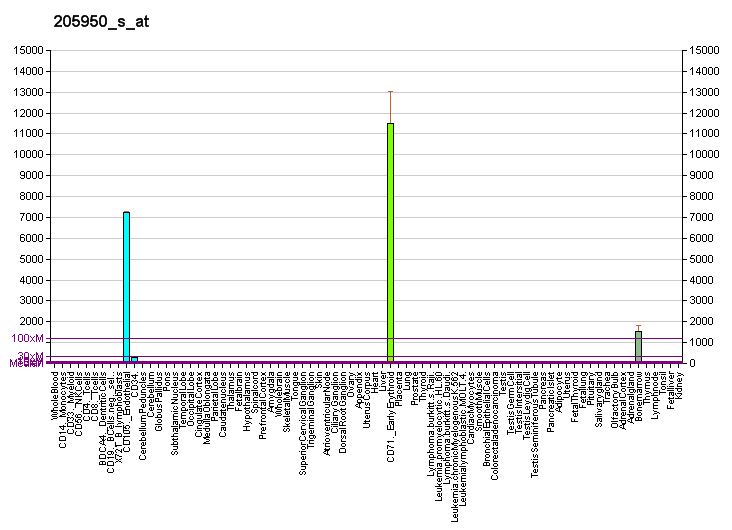

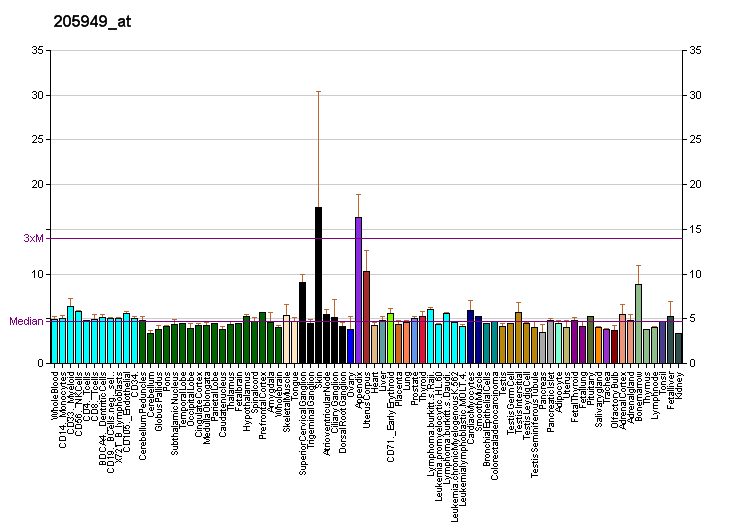
RNA expression pattern
| Bgee | Human / Mouse (ortholog); Top expressed in: mucosa of transverse colon; trabecular bone; mucosa of sigmoid colon; rectum; bone marrow cell; monocyte; epithelium of colon; mucosa of ileum; blood; testicle / Top expressed in: left colon; tibiofemoral joint; spleen; fetal liver hematopoietic progenitor cell; femur; body of femur; bone marrow; granulocyte; embryo; left lobe of liver; More reference expression data |
| BioGPS | More reference expression data |
Gene ontology
| Molecular function | metal ion binding; zinc ion binding; lyase activity; hydro-lyase activity; arylesterase activity; protein binding; carbonate dehydratase activity; carbonic anhydrase |
| Cellular component | extracellular exosome; cytosol; cytoplasm |
| Biological process | one-carbon metabolic process; bicarbonate transport; interleukin-12-mediated signaling pathway |
Sources:Amigo / QuickGO
Orthologs
| Databases | NCBI: entry; OMA: entry |
| Species | Human | Mouse |
| Entrez | 759 | 12346 |
| Ensembl | ENSG00000133742 | ENSMUSG00000027556 |
| UniProt | P00915 | P13634 |
| RefSeq (mRNA) | NM_001128829; NM_001128830; NM_001128831; NM_001164830; NM_001291967 NM_001291968; NM_001738 | NM_001083957; NM_009799 |
| RefSeq (protein) | NP_001122301; NP_001122302; NP_001122303; NP_001158302; NP_001278896 NP_001278897; NP_001729 | NP_001077426; NP_033929 |
| Location (UCSC) | Chr 8: 85.33 – 85.38 Mb | Chr 3: 14.83 – 14.87 Mb |
| PubMed search |
- Wikidata
| View/Edit Human | View/Edit Mouse |

Carbonic anhydrase 1 is an enzyme that in humans is encoded by the CA1 gene.

Carbonic anhydrases (CAs) are a large family of zinc metalloenzymes that catalyze the reversible hydration of carbon dioxide. They participate in a variety of biological processes, including cellular respiration, calcification, acid-base balance, bone resorption, and the formation of aqueous humor, cerebrospinal fluid, saliva, and gastric acid.

They show extensive diversity in tissue distribution and in their subcellular localization. CA1 is closely linked to CA2 and CA3 genes on chromosome 8, and it encodes a cytosolic protein which is found at the highest level in erythrocytes. Transcript variants of CA1 utilizing alternative polyA_sites have been described in literature.

== Structure ==
The human CA1 protein contains an N-terminus active site, zinc binding site, and substrate-binding site. The crystal structure of the human CA1-bicarbonate anion complex reveals the geometry of two H-bonds between the Glu106-Thr199 pair and the Glu117-His119 pair, and one pi H-bond between a water molecule and the phenyl ring of the Tyr114 residue. The product inhibition of CA1 via bicarbonate anions is correlated to the proton localization change on His119. So the Glu117-His119 H-bond is considered to regulate the ionicity of the zinc ion and the binding strength of the bicarbonate anion.

== Mechanism ==
The reaction catalyzed by CA1 is the same as other carbonic anhydrase family proteins:

$$\ce{CO2 + H2O ->[\ce{Carbonic~anhydrase}] H2CO3}$$

(in tissues - high CO_{2} concentration)

The CA1-catalyzed reaction has a relatively low reaction affinity (Km) of 4.0 mM for CO_{2}, turnover number (Kcat) of 2×10^{5} s^{−1}, and catalytic efficiency (Kcat/Km) of 5×10^{7} M^{−1}s^{−1} comparing to other isozymes of the α-CA family of carbonic anhydrases. The turnover rate and catalytic rate of CA1 are only about 10% that of CA2 (Kcat: 1.4×10^{6} s^{−1}, Kcat/Km: 1.5×10^{8} M^{−1}s^{−1}).

== Function ==
Carbonic anhydrase 1 belongs to α-CA sub-family and is localized in the cytosol of red blood cell, GI tract, cardiac tissues and other organs or tissues. Transmembrane transport of CA-produced bicarbonate contributes significantly to cellular pH regulation.

In a human zinc-activated variant of CA1, the Michigan Variant, a single point mutation changes His 67 to Arg in a critical region of the active site. This variant of the zinc metalloenzyme appears to be unique in that it possesses esterase activity that is specifically enhanced by added free zinc ions.

== Clinical significance ==
CA1 activation is associated with worsened pathological remodeling in human ischemic diabetic cardiomyopathy. In diabetic mellitus type 2 patients with postinfarct heart failure who were undergoing surgical coronary revascularization, myocardial levels of CA1 were sixfold higher than nondiabetic patients. Elevated CA1 expression was mainly localized in the cardiac interstitium and endothelial cells. Furthermore, high glucose-induced elevation of CA1 hampers endothelial cell permeability and determines endothelial cell apoptosis in vitro.

CA1 also mediates hemorrhagic retinal and cerebral vascular permeability through prekallikrein activation and serine protease factor XIIa generation. These phenomena induce proliferative diabetic retinopathy and diabetic macular edema disease progression, which represent leading causes of vision loss.

As CA1 is an important therapeutic target, development of its inhibitors will contribute to disease treatment. Compared to other CA family members, CA1 has relatively low affinity to common CA inhibitors. Nonetheless, it has medium affinity for CA inhibitor sulfonamides.

== Interactions ==
CA1 has been shown to interact with:

- TFCP2
- HSD17B7
- MAPK6

These interactions have been confirmed using the high throughput method (one hit)
