= Clostridium pasteurianum =

Scientific classification
- Domain: Bacteria
- Kingdom: Bacillati
- Phylum: Bacillota
- Class: Clostridia
- Order: Eubacteriales
- Family: Clostridiaceae
- Genus: Clostridium
- Species: C. pasteurianum

Binomial name
- Clostridium pasteurianum Winogradsky, 1895

Type strain
- 5, ATCC 6013, BCRC 10942, CCRC 10942, CCT 0203, CCUG 31328, CECT 377, DSM 525, DSMZ 525, E. McCoy 5, FIRDI 942, IMET 11346, IMG 1584 b, IZ 563, JCM 1108, JCM 1408, KCTC 1674, L.S. McClung 2300, LMAU C85, LMG 3285, LMG 5709, McClung 2000, McClung 2300, McClung L.S. 2300, McClung L.S., 2300, McCoy 5, McCoy E. 5, NCDO 1845, NCFB 1845, NCIB 9486, NCIMB 9486, VKM B-1774, W-5, Winogradsky W-5

Synonyms
- Clostridium pastorianus (sic) Winogradsky 1902; Bacillus pasteurianus (Winogradsky 1895) Lehmann and Neumann 1907; Bacillus pastorianus (Winogradsky 1902) Lehmann and Neumann 1907; Bacillus winogradsky Matzuschita 1902; Butyribacillus pasteurianus (Winogradsky 1895) Orla-Jensen 1909

Species of bacterium

Clostridium pasteurianum (previously known as Clostridium pastorianum) is a bacterium discovered in 1890 by the Russian microbiologist Sergei Winogradsky. It was the first free living (non-symbiotic) micro-organism discovered that could fix free nitrogen from the air.

Clostridium pasteurianum is a producer of carboxylic acids. It has the ability to convert carbohydrates to butyrate, acetate, carbon dioxide, and molecular hydrogen through fermentation. Similar to Clostridium acetobutylicum, Clostridium pasteurianum also has the ability to switch from acid to solvent production under certain growth conditions, Several efforts have been made to document its growth conditions; however, it is still unclear whether the growth parameters which have been shown to produce favorable solvent production in C. acetobutylicum played a significant role in the regulation of metabolism in C. pasteurianum in a similar fashion. It produces the gaseous alteration of canned fruits and tomatoes and does not develop at a pH lower than 3.7.

C. pasteurianum is a mesophile.

== Taxonomy ==
Initially named Clostridium pastorianum by Winogradsky, its name was later changed to the current spelling.

== Morphology ==
Clostridium pasteurianum is a large, Gram-positive, spore-forming bacillus. It is a soil bacterium, and an obligate anaerobe.
