= Butyryl-CoA =

Chemical compound (organic coenzyme)

- Stereo skeletal formula of tetradeprotonated butyryl-coA ({[(2R,3S,4R,5R)-5-yl,-2-meth,-4-hydrox,-3-yl]})

Names
- IUPAC name 3′-O-Phosphonoadenosine 5′-{[(2R,3S,4R,5R)-5-(6-Amino-9H-purin-9-yl)-4-hydroxy-3-(phosphonooxy)oxolan-2-yl]methyl} O^{3}-{(3R)-4-[(3-{[2-(butanoylsulfanyl)ethyl]amino}-3-oxopropyl)amino]-3-hydroxy-2,2-dimethyl-4-oxobutyl dihydrogen diphosphate}
- Systematic IUPAC name O^{1}-{[(2R,3S,4R,5R)-5-(6-Amino-9H-purin-9-yl)-4-hydroxy-3-(phosphonooxy)oxolan-2-yl]methyl} O^{3}-{(3R)-4-[(3-{[2-(butanoylsulfanyl)ethyl]amino}-3-oxopropyl)amino]-3-hydroxy-2,2-dimethyl-4-oxobutyl} dihydrogen diphosphate

Identifiers
CAS Number	2140-48-9
3D model (JSmol)	Interactive image
ChEBI	CHEBI:15517
ChemSpider	260; 388318 {[(2R,3S,4R,5R)-5-yl,-2-meth,-4-hydrox,-3-yl]}; 5292369 {[(2R,3R,5R)-5-yl,-2-({[{[(3S)-3-hydrox]-ox}-phosph]-ox}-meth),-3-yl]}
KEGG	C00136
MeSH	butyryl-coenzyme+A
PubChem CID	265; 25201345 {[(2R,5R)-5-yl,-2-({[{[(3R)-3-hydrox]-ox}-phosph]-ox}-meth),-3-yl]}; 439173 {[(2R,3S,4R,5R)-5-yl,-2-meth,-4-hydrox,-3-yl]}; 46907881 {[(2R,3R,5R)-5-yl,-2-({[{[(3R)-3-hydrox]-ox}-phosph]-ox}-meth),-3-yl]}; 6917112 {[(2R,3R,5R)-5-yl,-2-({[{[(3S)-3-hydrox]-ox}-phosph]-ox}-meth),-3-yl]}
CompTox Dashboard (EPA)	DTXSID70943955
- InChI: InChI=1S/C25H42N7O17P3S/c1-4-5-16(34)53-9-8-27-15(33)6-7-28-23(37)20(36)25(2,3)11-46-52(43,44)49-51(41,42)45-10-14-19(48-50(38,39)40)18(35)24(47-14)32-13-31-17-21(26)29-12-30-22(17)32/h12-14,18-20,24,35-36H,4-11H2,1-3H3,(H,27,33)(H,28,37)(H,41,42)(H,43,44)(H2,26,29,30)(H2,38,39,40) Key: CRFNGMNYKDXRTN-UHFFFAOYSA-N
- SMILES: CCCC(=O)SCCNC(=O)CCNC(=O)C(O)C(C)(C)COP(O)(=O)OP(O)(=O)OCC1OC(C(O)C1OP(O)(O)=O)N1C=NC2=C(N)N=CN=C12

Properties
Chemical formula	C_{25}H_{42}N_{7}O_{17}P_{3}S
Molar mass	837.62 g·mol^{−1}
- Except where otherwise noted, data are given for materials in their standard state (at 25 °C [77 °F], 100 kPa). Infobox references

Butyryl-CoA (or butyryl-coenzyme A, butanoyl-CoA) is an organic coenzyme A-containing derivative of butyric acid. It is a natural product found in many biological pathways, such as fatty acid metabolism (degradation and elongation), fermentation, and 4-aminobutanoate (GABA) degradation. It mostly participates as an intermediate, a precursor to and converted from crotonyl-CoA. This interconversion is mediated by butyryl-CoA dehydrogenase.

From redox data, butyryl-CoA dehydrogenase shows little to no activity at pH higher than 7.0. This is important as enzyme midpoint potential is at pH 7.0 and at 25 °C. Therefore, changes above from this value will denature the enzyme.

Within the human colon, butyrate helps supply energy to the gut epithelium and helps regulate cell responses.

Butyryl-CoA has a very high calculated potential Gibbs energy, -462.53937 kcal/mol, stored at its bond with CoA.

== Reaction ==
=== Fatty acid metabolism ===
Butyryl-CoA interconverts to and from 3-oxohexanoyl-CoA by acetyl-CoA acetyltransferase (or thiolase). In terms of organic chemistry, the reaction is the reverse of a Claisen condensation. Subsequently butyryl-CoA is converted into crotonyl-CoA. The conversion is catalyzed by electron-transfer flavoprotein 2,3-oxidoreductase. This enzyme has many synonyms that are orthologous to each other, including butyryl-CoA dehydrogenase, acyl-CoA dehydrogenase, acyl-CoA oxidase, and short-chain 2-methylacyl-CoA dehydrogenase

=== Fermentation ===
Butyryl-CoA is an intermediate of the fermentation pathway found in Clostridium kluyveri. This species can ferment acetyl-CoA and succinate into butanoate, extracting energy through the process. The fermentation pathway from ethanol to acetyl-CoA to butanoate is also known as ABE fermentation.

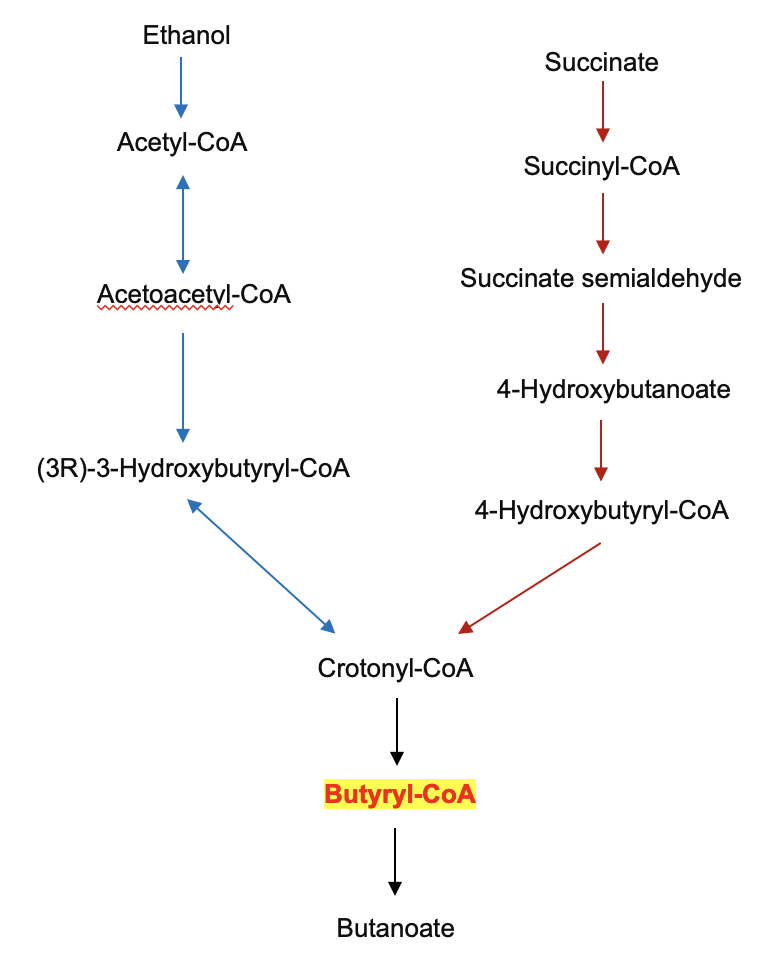
Overview of fermentation pathways in Clostridium kluyveri. The red arrow is the succinate fermentation pathway; the blue arrow is the ethanol/acetyl-CoA fermentation pathway, also known as ABE fermentation.

Butyryl-CoA is reduced from crotonyl-CoAcatalyzing by butyryl-CoA dehydrogenase, where two NADH molecules donate four electrons, with two of them reducing ferredoxin ([2Fe-2S] cluster) and the other two reducing crotonyl-CoA into butyryl-CoA. Subsequently, butyryl-CoA is converted into butanoate by propionyl-CoA transferase, which transfers the coenzyme-A group onto an acetate, forming acetyl-CoA.

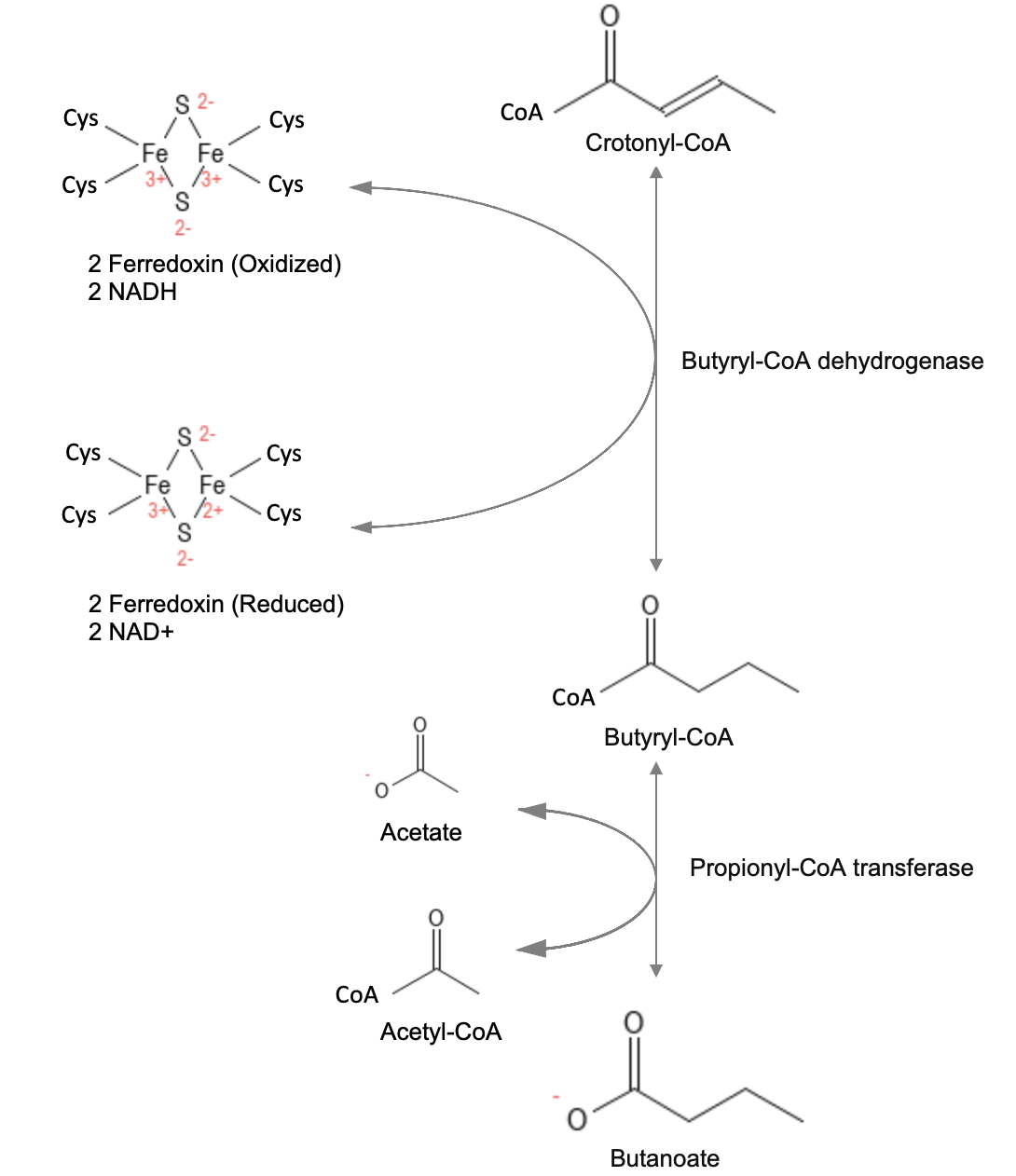
Conversion from crotonyl-CoA to butyryl-CoA to butanoate

It is essential in reducing ferredoxins in anaerobic bacteria and archaea so that electron transport phosphorylation and substrate-level phosphorylation can occur with increased efficiency.

=== 4-Aminobutanoate (GABA) degradation ===
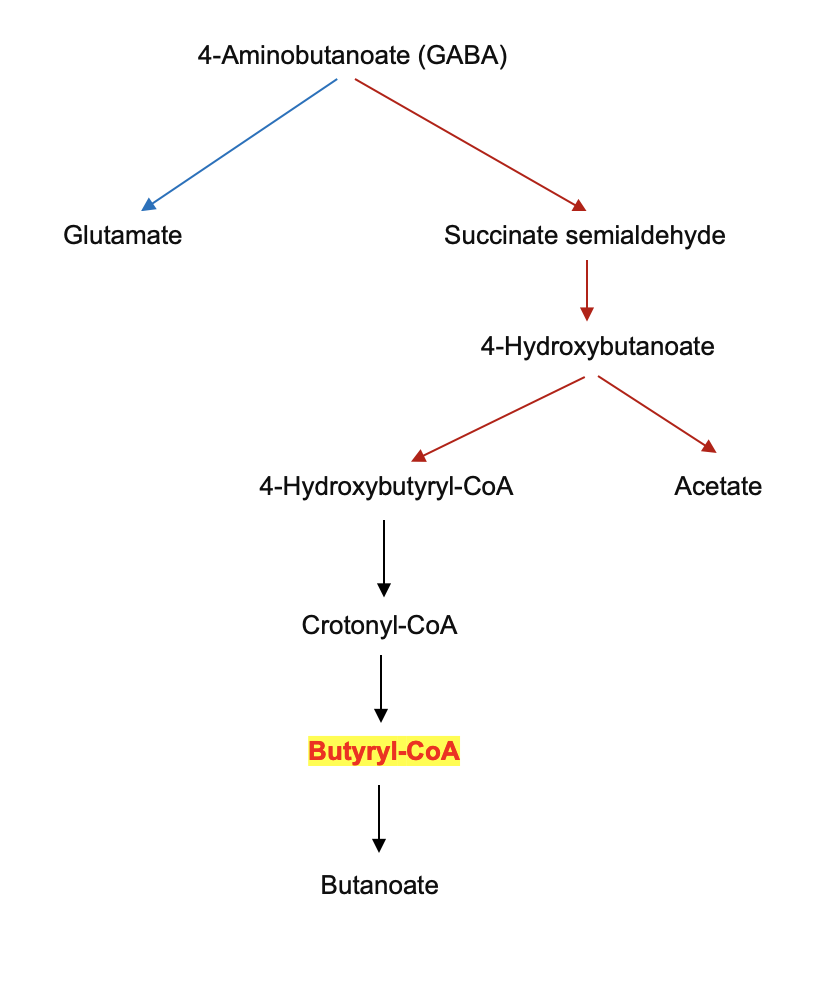
Overview of 4-aminobutanoate (GABA) degradation

Butyryl-CoA is also an intermediate found in 4-aminobutanoate (GABA) degradation. 4-aminobutanoate (GABA) has two fates in this degradation pathway. When discovered in Acetoanaerobium sticklandii and Pseudomonas fluorescens, 4-aminobutanoate was converted into glutamate, which can be deaminated, releasing ammonium. However, in Acetoanaerobium sticklandii and Clostridium aminobutyricum, 4-aminobutanoate was converted into succinate semialdehyde and, through a series of steps via the intermediate of butanoyl-CoA, finally converted into butanoate.

The degradation pathway plays an important role in regulating the concentration of GABA, which is an inhibitory neurotransmitter that reduces neuronal excitability. Dysregulation of GABA degradation can lead to imbalances in neurotransmitter levels, contributing to various neurological disorders such as epilepsy, anxiety, and depression. The reaction mechanism is the same as that in the fermentation pathway, where butyryl-CoA is first reduced from crotonyl-CoA and then converted into butanoate.

== Regulation ==
Butyryl-CoA acts upon butanol dehydrogenase via competitive inhibition. The adenine moiety can bind butanol dehydrogenase and reduce its activity. The phosphate moiety of butyryl-CoA is found to have inhibitory activities upon its binding with phosphotransbutyrylase.

Butyryl-CoA is also believed to have inhibitory effects on acetyl-CoA acetyltransferase, DL-methylmalonyl-CoA racemase, and glycine N-acyltransferase, however, the specific mechanism remains unknown.

== See also ==
- Acyl-CoA
  - Fatty acyl-CoA esters
