= Gut microbiota =

Community of microorganisms in the gut

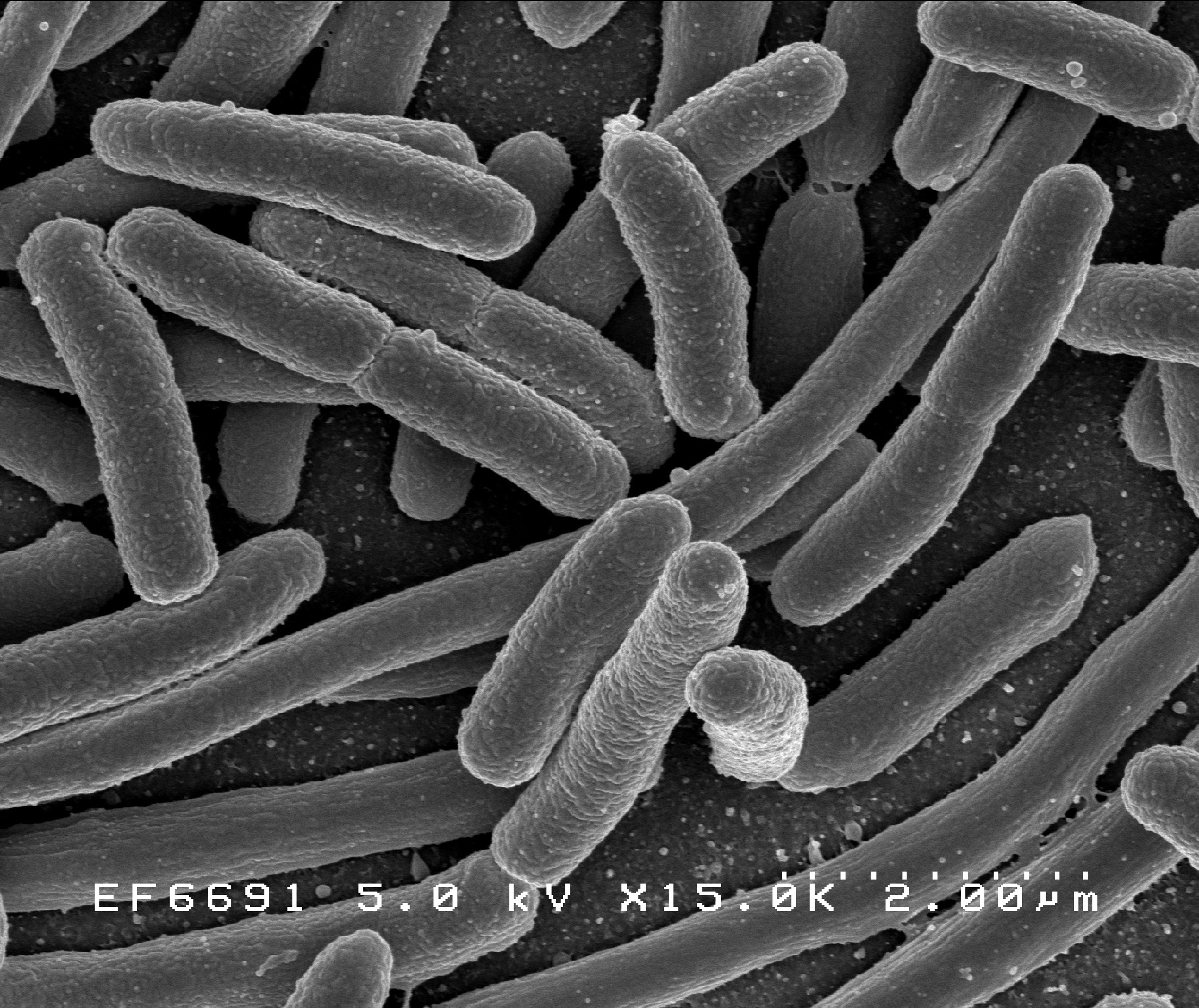
Escherichia coli, one of the many species of bacteria present in the human gut

Gut microbiota, gut microbiome, or gut flora are the microorganisms, including bacteria, archaea, fungi, and viruses, that live in the digestive tracts of animals. The gastrointestinal metagenome is the aggregate of all the genomes of the gut microbiota. The gut is the main location of the human microbiome. The gut microbiota has broad impacts, including effects on colonization, resistance to pathogens, maintaining the intestinal epithelium, metabolizing dietary and pharmaceutical compounds, controlling immune function, and even behavior through the gut–brain axis. Imbalances in the gut microbiota (dysbiosis) have been associated with numerous diseases, including inflammatory bowel disease, certain cancers, and even neurological disorders, prompting increased efforts to develop microbiome-targeted therapies.

The microbial composition of the gut microbiota varies across regions of the digestive tract. The colon contains the highest microbial density of any human-associated microbial community studied so far, representing between 300 and 1000 different species. Bacteria are the largest and to date, best studied component and 99% of gut bacteria come from about 30 or 40 species. About 55% of the dry mass of feces is bacteria. Over 99% of the bacteria in the gut are anaerobes, but in the cecum, aerobic bacteria reach high densities. It is estimated that the human gut microbiota has around a hundred times as many genes as there are in the human genome.

== Overview ==
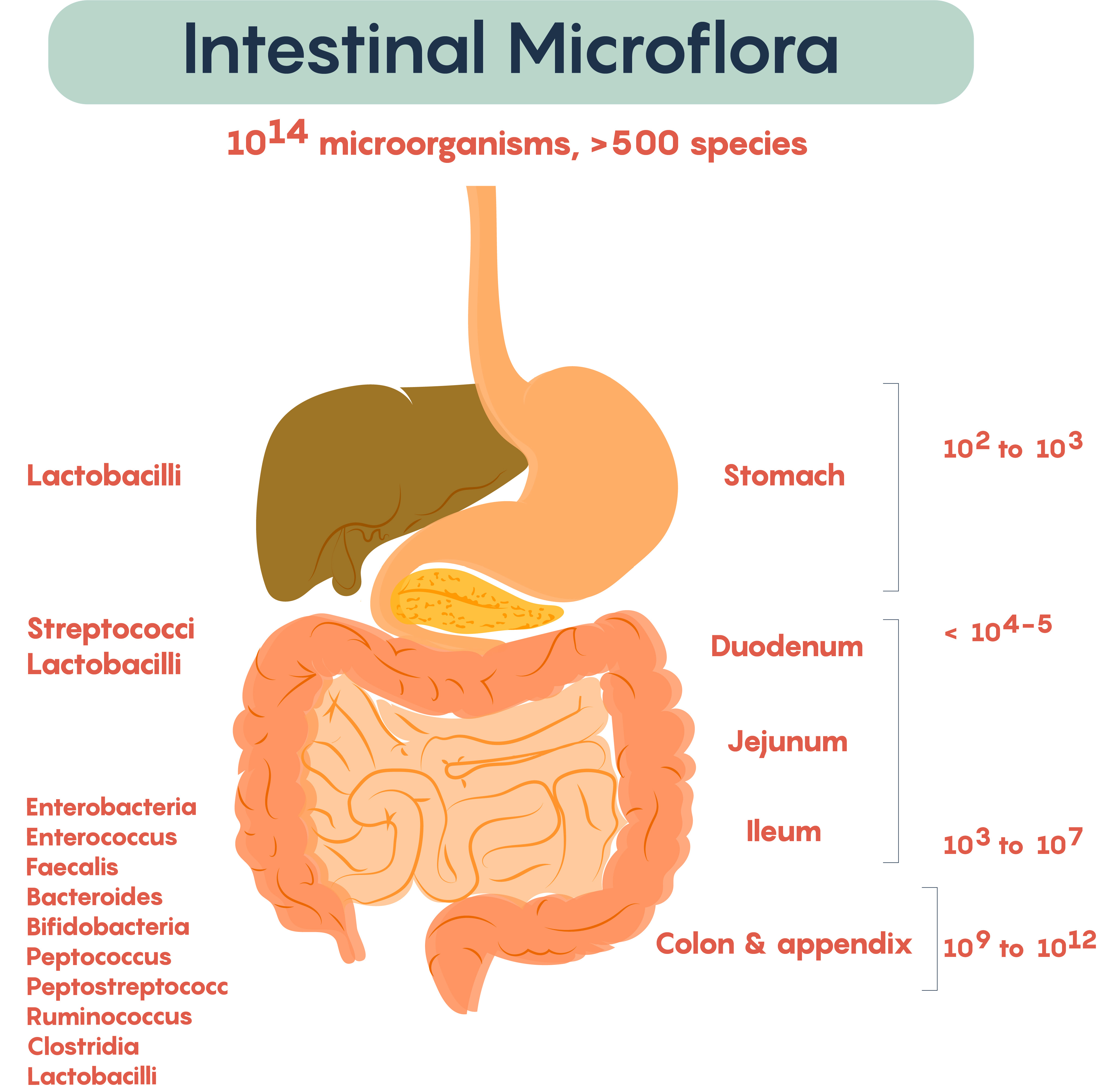
Composition and distribution of gut microbiota in human body

In humans, the gut microbiota has the highest numbers and species of bacteria compared to other areas of the body. The approximate number of bacteria composing the gut microbiota is about 10^{13}–10^{14} (10 to 100 trillion). In humans, the gut flora is established at birth and gradually transitions towards a state resembling that of adults by the age of two, coinciding with the development and maturation of the intestinal epithelium and intestinal mucosal barrier. This barrier is essential for supporting a symbiotic relationship with the gut flora while providing protection against pathogenic organisms.

The relationship between some gut microbiota and humans is not merely commensal (a non-harmful coexistence), but rather a mutualistic relationship. Some human gut microorganisms benefit the host by fermenting dietary fiber into short-chain fatty acids (SCFAs), such as acetic acid and butyric acid, which are then absorbed by the host. Intestinal bacteria also play a role in synthesizing certain B vitamins and vitamin K as well as metabolizing bile acids, sterols, and xenobiotics. The systemic importance of the SCFAs and other compounds they produce are like hormones and the gut flora itself appears to function like an endocrine organ. Dysregulation of the gut flora has been correlated with a host of inflammatory and autoimmune conditions.

The composition of human gut microbiota changes over time, when the diet changes, and as overall health changes. A systematic review from 2016 examined the preclinical and small human trials that have been conducted with certain commercially available strains of probiotic bacteria and identified those that had the most potential to be useful for certain central nervous system disorders. It should also be highlighted that the Mediterranean diet, rich in vegetables and fibers, stimulates the activity and growth of beneficial bacteria for the brain.

== Classifications ==
The microbial composition of the gut microbiota varies across the digestive tract. In the stomach and small intestine, relatively few species of bacteria are generally present. Fungi, protists, archaea, and viruses are also present in the gut flora, but less is known about their activities.

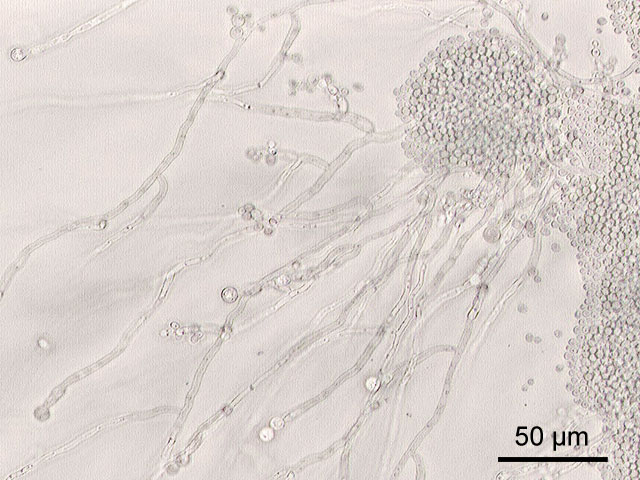
Candida albicans, a yeast found in the gut

Many species in the gut have not been studied outside of their hosts because they cannot be cultured. While there are a small number of core microbial species shared by most individuals, populations of microbes can vary widely. Within an individual, their microbial populations stay fairly constant over time, with some alterations occurring due to changes in lifestyle, diet and age. The Human Microbiome Project has set out to better describe the microbiota of the human gut and other body locations.

The four dominant bacterial phyla in the human gut are Bacillota (Firmicutes), Bacteroidota, Actinomycetota, and Pseudomonadota. Most bacteria belong to the genera Bacteroides, Clostridium, Faecalibacterium, Eubacterium, Ruminococcus, Peptococcus, Peptostreptococcus, and Bifidobacterium. Other genera, such as Escherichia and Lactobacillus, are present to a lesser extent. Species from the genus Bacteroides alone constitute about 30% of all bacteria in the gut, suggesting that this genus is especially important in the functioning of the host.

Fungal genera that have been detected in the gut include Candida, Saccharomyces, Aspergillus, Penicillium, Rhodotorula, Trametes, Pleospora, Sclerotinia, Bullera, and Galactomyces, among others. Rhodotorula is most frequently found in individuals with inflammatory bowel disease while Candida is most frequently found in individuals with hepatitis B cirrhosis and chronic hepatitis B.

Archaea constitute another large class of gut flora which are important in the metabolism of the bacterial products of fermentation.

Industrialization is associated with changes in the microbiota and the reduction of diversity could drive certain species to extinction; in 2018, researchers proposed a biobank repository of human microbiota.

=== Enterotype ===
An enterotype is a classification of living organisms based on its bacteriological ecosystem in the human gut microbiome not dictated by age, gender, body weight, or national divisions. There are indications that long-term diet influences enterotype. Three human enterotypes have been proposed, but their value has been questioned.

== Composition ==
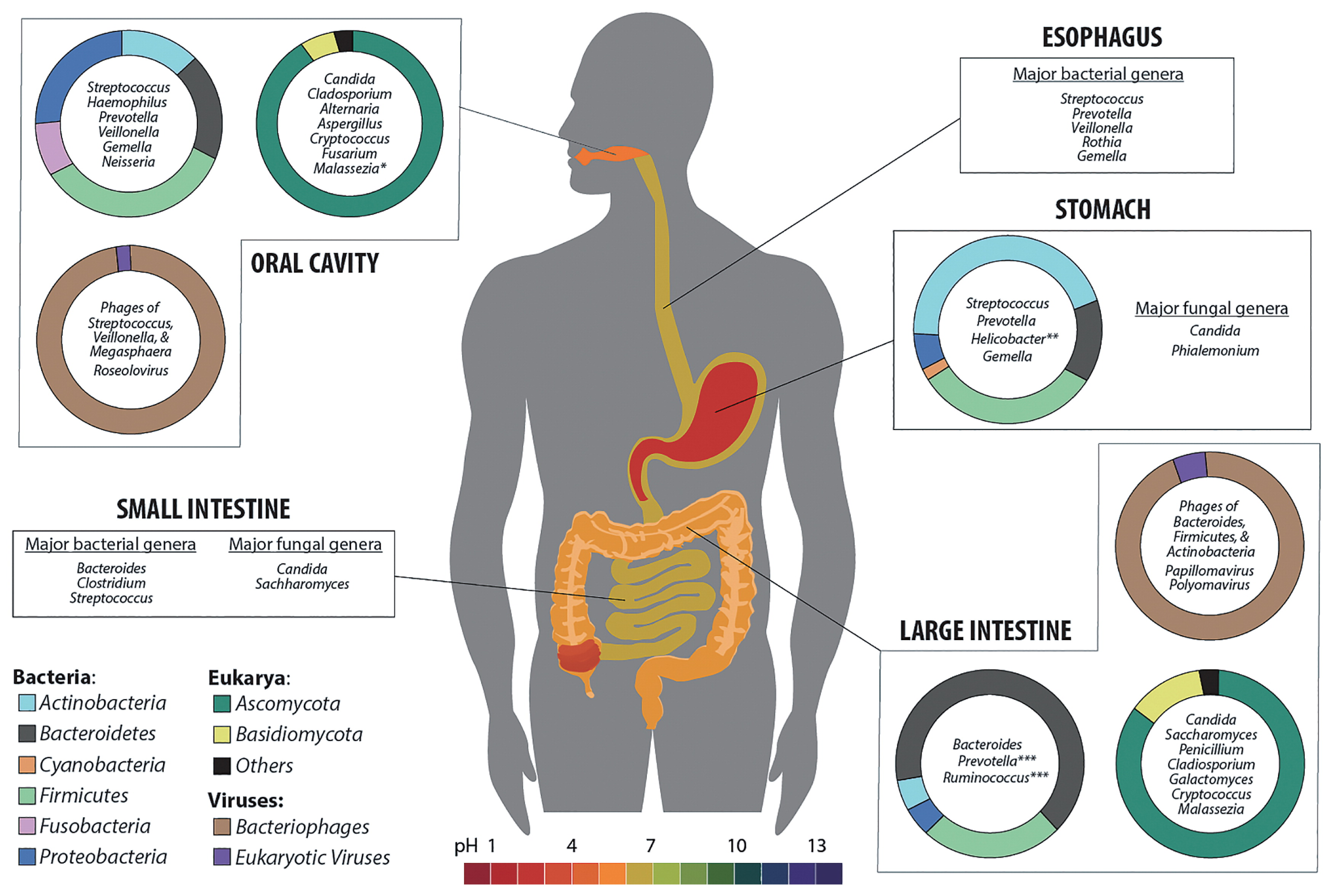
Diagram of human gastrointestinal tract microbiota depicted in various regions

=== Bacteria ===
==== Stomach ====
Due to the high acidity of the stomach, most microorganisms cannot survive there. The main bacteria of the gastric microbiota belong to five major phyla: Firmicutes, Bacteroidetes, Actinobacteria, Fusobacteriota, and Proteobacteria. The dominant genera are Prevotella, Streptococcus, Veillonella, Rothia, and Haemophilus. The interaction between the pre-existing gastric microbiota with the introduction of H. pylori may influence disease progression. When there is a presence of H. pylori it becomes the dominant species of the microbiota.

==== Intestines ====
Bacteria commonly found in the human colon
Bacterium	Incidence (%)
Bacteroides fragilis	100
Bacteroides melaninogenicus	100
Bacteroides oralis	100
Enterococcus faecalis	100
Escherichia coli	100
Enterobacter sp.	40–80
Klebsiella sp.	40–80
Bifidobacterium bifidum	30–70
Staphylococcus aureus	30–50
Lactobacillus	20–60
Clostridium perfringens	25–35
Proteus mirabilis	5–55
Clostridium tetani	1–35
Clostridium septicum	5–25
Pseudomonas aeruginosa	3–11
Salmonella enterica	3–7
Faecalibacterium prausnitzii	?common
Peptostreptococcus sp.	?common
Peptococcus sp.	?common

The small intestine contains a trace amount of microorganisms due to the proximity and influence of the stomach. Gram-positive cocci and rod-shaped bacteria are the predominant microorganisms found in the small intestine. However, in the distal portion of the small intestine alkaline conditions support gram-negative bacteria of the Enterobacteriaceae. The bacterial flora of the small intestine aid in a wide range of intestinal functions. The bacterial flora provide regulatory signals that enable the development and utility of the gut. Overgrowth of bacteria in the small intestine can lead to intestinal failure. In addition the large intestine contains the largest bacterial ecosystem in the human body. About 99% of the large intestine and feces flora are made up of obligate anaerobes such as Bacteroides and Bifidobacterium. Factors that disrupt the microorganism population of the large intestine include antibiotics, stress, and parasites.

Bacteria make up most of the flora in the colon and account for 60% of fecal nitrogen. This fact makes feces an ideal source of gut flora for any tests and experiments by extracting the nucleic acid from fecal specimens, and bacterial 16S rRNA gene sequences are generated with bacterial primers. This form of testing is also often preferable to more invasive techniques, such as biopsies.

Five phyla dominate the intestinal microbiota: Bacteroidota, Bacillota (Firmicutes), Actinomycetota, Pseudomonadota, and Verrucomicrobiota – with Bacteroidota and Bacillota constituting 90% of the composition. Somewhere between 300 and 1000 different species live in the gut, with most estimates at about 500. However, it is probable that 99% of the bacteria come from about 30 or 40 species, with Faecalibacterium prausnitzii (phylum firmicutes) being the most common species in healthy adults.

Research suggests that the relationship between gut flora and humans is not merely commensal (a non-harmful coexistence), but rather is a mutualistic, symbiotic relationship. Though people can survive with no gut flora, the microorganisms perform a host of useful functions, such as fermenting unused energy substrates, training the immune system via end products of metabolism like propionate and acetate, preventing growth of harmful species, regulating the development of the gut, producing vitamins for the host (such as biotin and vitamin K), and producing hormones to direct the host to store fats. Extensive modification and imbalances of the gut microbiota and its microbiome or gene collection are associated with obesity. However, in certain conditions, some species are thought to be capable of causing disease by causing infection or increasing cancer risk for the host.

=== Fungi ===
Fungi also make up a part of the gut flora, but less is known about their activities.

Due to the prevalence of fungi in the natural environment, determining which genera and species are permanent members of the gut mycobiome is difficult. Research is underway as to whether Penicillium is a permanent or transient member of the gut flora, obtained from dietary sources such as cheese, though several species in the genus are known to survive at temperatures around 37 °C, about the same as the core body temperature. Saccharomyces cerevisiae, brewer's yeast, is known to reach the intestines after being ingested and can be responsible for the condition auto-brewery syndrome in cases where it is overabundant, while Candida albicans is likely a permanent member, and is believed to be acquired at birth through vertical transmission.

=== Viruses ===
The human virome includes all viruses associated with the human body, ranging from viruses that infect native cells to bacteriophages that infect bacteria in the microbiome. Among these, bacteriophages are by far the most numerous.

== Variation ==
=== Age ===
There are common patterns of microbiome composition evolution during life. In general, the diversity of microbiota composition of fecal samples is significantly higher in adults than in children, although interpersonal differences are higher in children than in adults. Much of the maturation of microbiota into an adult-like configuration happens during the first three years of life.

As the microbiome composition changes, so does the composition of bacterial proteins produced in the gut. In adult microbiomes, a high prevalence of enzymes involved in fermentation, methanogenesis and the metabolism of arginine, glutamate, aspartate and lysine have been found. In contrast, in infant microbiomes the dominant enzymes are involved in cysteine metabolism and fermentation pathways.

=== Geography ===
Gut microbiome composition depends on the geographic origin of populations. Variations in a trade-off of Prevotella, the representation of the urease gene, and the representation of genes encoding glutamate synthase/degradation or other enzymes involved in amino acids degradation or vitamin biosynthesis show significant differences between populations from the US, Malawi, or Amerindian origin.

The US population has a high representation of enzymes encoding the degradation of glutamine and enzymes involved in vitamin and lipoic acid biosynthesis; whereas Malawi and Amerindian populations have a high representation of enzymes encoding glutamate synthase and they also have an overrepresentation of α-amylase in their microbiomes. As the US population has a diet richer in fats than Amerindian or Malawian populations which have a corn-rich diet, the diet is probably the main determinant of the gut bacterial composition.

Further studies have indicated a large difference in the composition of microbiota between European and rural African children. The fecal bacteria of children from Florence were compared to that of children from the small rural village of Boulpon in Burkina Faso. The diet of a typical child living in this village is largely lacking in fats and animal proteins and rich in polysaccharides and plant proteins. The fecal bacteria of European children were dominated by Firmicutes and showed a marked reduction in biodiversity, while the fecal bacteria of the Boulpon children was dominated by Bacteroidetes. The increased biodiversity and different composition of the gut microbiome in African populations may aid in the digestion of normally indigestible plant polysaccharides and also may result in a reduced incidence of non-infectious colonic diseases. Studies of hunter-gatherer populations have further demonstrated the impact of subsistence strategy on gut microbiome composition. Research on the Hadza, a hunter-gatherer community in Tanzania, found significantly greater microbial diversity compared to Italian controls, with enrichment in taxa such as Treponema, Prevotella, and unclassified Bacteroidetes associated with the fermentation of fibrous plant foods. Similarly, analysis of the gut microbiome of Yanomami Amerindians in Venezuela, a community with no prior documented contact with Western populations, revealed the highest level of bacterial diversity recorded in a human group. This suggests that industrialization and Western diets are associated with a progressive loss of ancestral microbial diversity.

On a smaller scale, it has been shown that sharing numerous common environmental exposures in a family is a strong determinant of individual microbiome composition. This effect has no genetic influence and it is consistently observed in culturally different populations.

==== Malnourishment ====
Malnourished children have less mature and less diverse gut microbiota than healthy children, and changes in the microbiome associated with nutrient scarcity can in turn be a pathophysiological cause of malnutrition. Malnourished children also typically have more potentially pathogenic gut flora, and more yeast in their mouths and throats. Altering diet may lead to changes in gut microbiota composition and diversity.

=== Race and ethnicity ===
Researchers with the American Gut Project and Human Microbiome Project found that twelve microbe families varied in abundance based on the race or ethnicity of the individual. The strength of these associations is limited by the small sample size: the American Gut Project collected data from 1,375 individuals, 90% of whom were white. The Healthy Life in an Urban Setting (HELIUS) study in Amsterdam found that those of Dutch ancestry had the highest level of gut microbiota diversity, while those of South Asian and Surinamese descent had the lowest diversity. The study results suggested that individuals of the same race or ethnicity have more similar microbiomes than individuals of different racial backgrounds.

=== Socioeconomic status ===
As of 2020, at least two studies have demonstrated a link between an individual's socioeconomic status (SES) and their gut microbiota. A study in Chicago found that individuals in higher SES neighborhoods had greater microbiota diversity. People from higher SES neighborhoods also had more abundant Bacteroides bacteria. Similarly, a study of twins in the United Kingdom found that higher SES was also linked with a greater gut diversity.

=== Antibiotic use ===
As of 2023, a study suggests that antibiotics, especially those used in the treatment of broad-spectrum bacterial infections, have negative effects on the gut microbiota. The study also states that there are many experts on intestinal health concerned that antibody usage has reduced the diversity of the gut microbiota, many of the strains are lost, and if there is a re-emergence of the bacteria, it is gradual and long-term.

== Functions ==
When the study of gut flora began in 1995, it was thought to have three key roles: direct defense against pathogens, fortification of host defense by its role in developing and maintaining the intestinal epithelium and inducing antibody production there, and metabolizing otherwise indigestible compounds in food. Subsequent work discovered its role in training the developing immune system, and yet further work focused on its role in the gut–brain axis. The gut microbiota not only influences intestinal health but also plays a role in systemic immune regulation, including interactions with the pulmonary immune environment through what is known as the 'gut–lung axis'.

=== Direct inhibition of pathogens ===
The gut flora community plays a direct role in defending against pathogens by fully colonising the space, making use of all available nutrients, and by secreting compounds known as cytokines that kill or inhibit unwelcome organisms that would compete for nutrients with it. Different strains of gut bacteria cause the production of different cytokines. Cytokines are chemical compounds produced by our immune system for initiating the inflammatory response against infections. Disruption of the gut flora allows competing organisms like Clostridioides difficile to become established that otherwise are kept in abeyance.

=== Development of enteric protection and immune system ===
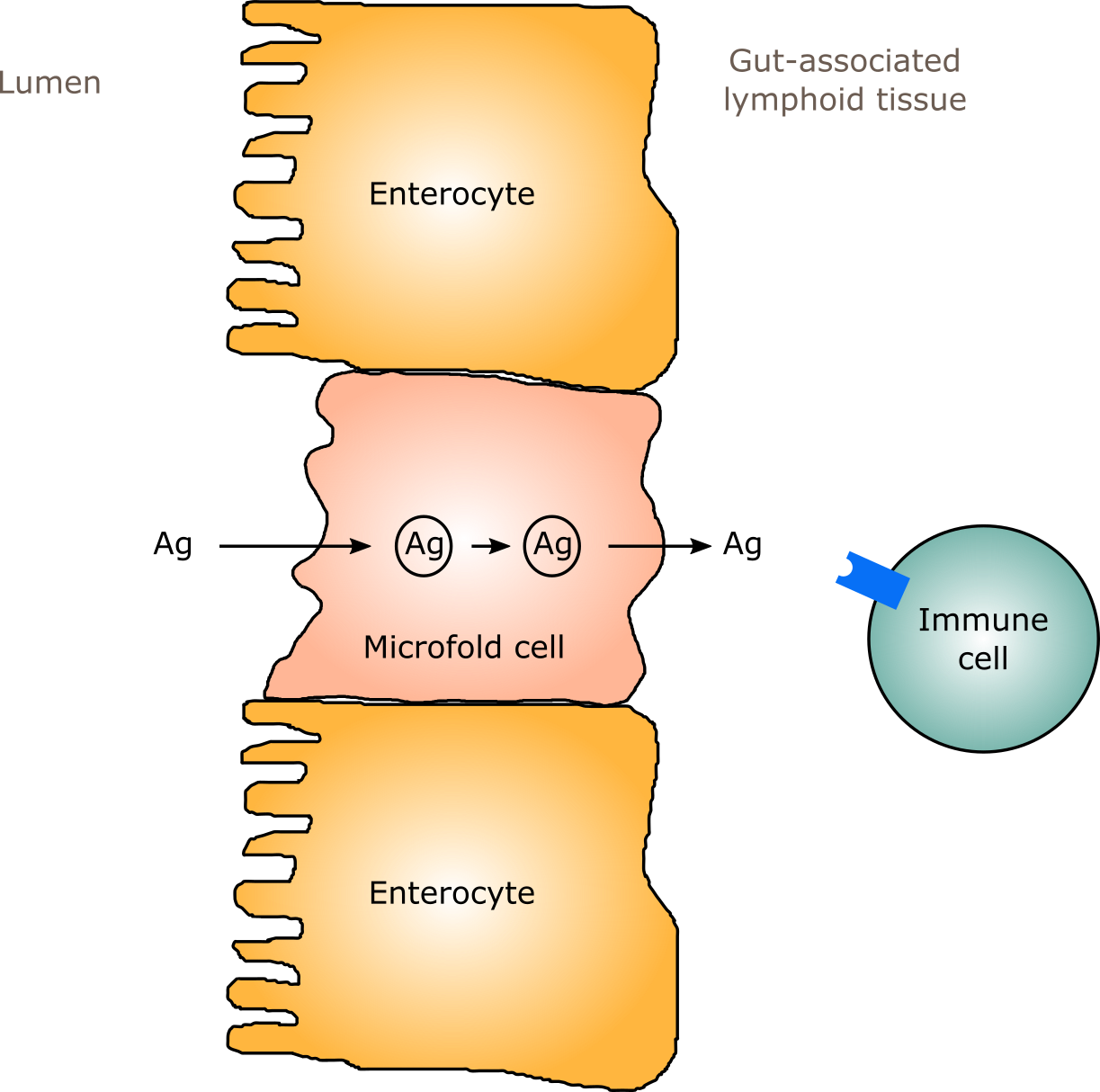
Microfold cell transfer antigens (Ag) from the lumen of the gut to gut-associated lymphoid tissue (GALT) via transcytosis and present them to different innate and adaptive immune cells.

Gut flora in infants becomes similar to an adult within one to two years of birth. As the gut flora establishes, the lining of the intestines – the intestinal epithelium and the intestinal mucosal barrier that it secretes – develop a symbiosis with microorganisms. Specifically, goblet cells that produce the mucosa proliferate, and the mucosa layer thickens, providing an outside mucosal layer in which favorable microorganisms can anchor and feed, and an inner layer that these organisms cannot penetrate. Additionally, the development of gut-associated lymphoid tissue (GALT), which forms part of the intestinal epithelium and which detects and reacts to pathogens, develops during the time that the gut flora becomes established. The GALT that develops is tolerant to gut flora species, but not to other microorganisms. GALT also normally becomes tolerant to food the infant consumes, and the gut flora metabolites (molecules formed from metabolism) produced from food.

The human immune system creates cytokines that can drive the immune system to produce inflammation in order to protect itself, and that can tamp down the immune response to maintain homeostasis and allow healing after insult or injury. Different bacterial species that appear in gut flora have been shown to be able to drive the immune system to create cytokines selectively; for example Bacteroides fragilis and some Clostridia species appear to drive an anti-inflammatory response, while some segmented filamentous bacteria drive the production of inflammatory cytokines. Gut flora can also regulate the production of antibodies by the immune system. One function of this regulation is to cause B cells to class switch to IgA. In most cases B cells need activation from T helper cells to induce class switching; however, in another pathway, gut flora cause NF-kB signaling by intestinal epithelial cells which results in further signaling molecules being secreted. These signaling molecules interact with B cells to induce class switching to IgA. IgA is an important type of antibody that is used in mucosal environments like the gut. It has been shown that IgA can help diversify the gut community and helps in getting rid of bacteria that cause inflammatory responses. Ultimately, IgA maintains a healthy environment between the host and gut bacteria. These cytokines and antibodies can have effects outside the gut, in the lungs and other tissues.

A 2022 review indicated that various mechanisms are under preliminary research to assess how gut microbes may modulate vaccine immunogenicity, including effects on antigen presentation and cytokine profiles.

=== Metabolism ===
Tryptophan metabolism by human gut microbiota ()
This diagram shows the biosynthesis of bioactive compounds (indole and certain other derivatives) from tryptophan by bacteria in the gut. Indole is produced from tryptophan by bacteria that express tryptophanase. Clostridium sporogenes metabolizes tryptophan into indole and subsequently 3-indolepropionic acid (IPA), a highly potent neuroprotective antioxidant that scavenges hydroxyl radicals. IPA binds to the pregnane X receptor (PXR) in intestinal cells, thereby facilitating mucosal homeostasis and barrier function. Following absorption from the intestine and distribution to the brain, IPA confers a neuroprotective effect against cerebral ischemia and Alzheimer's disease. Lactobacillaceae (Lactobacillus s.l.) species metabolize tryptophan into indole-3-aldehyde (I3A) which acts on the aryl hydrocarbon receptor (AhR) in intestinal immune cells, in turn increasing interleukin 22 (IL-22) production. Indole itself triggers the secretion of glucagon-like peptide-1 (GLP-1) in intestinal L cells and acts as a ligand for AhR. Indole can also be metabolized by the liver into indoxyl sulfate, a compound that is toxic in high concentrations and associated with vascular disease and renal dysfunction. AST-120 (activated charcoal), an intestinal sorbent that is taken by mouth, adsorbs indole, in turn decreasing the concentration of indoxyl sulfate in blood plasma.

Without gut flora, the human body would be unable to utilize some of the undigested carbohydrates it consumes, because some types of gut flora have enzymes that human cells lack for breaking down certain polysaccharides. Rodents raised in a sterile environment and lacking in gut flora need to eat 30% more calories just to remain the same weight as their normal counterparts. Carbohydrates that humans cannot digest without bacterial help include certain starches, fiber, oligosaccharides, and sugars that the body failed to digest and absorb like lactose in the case of lactose intolerance and sugar alcohols, mucus produced by the gut, and proteins.

Bacteria turn carbohydrates they ferment into short-chain fatty acids by a form of fermentation called saccharolytic fermentation. Products include acetic acid, propionic acid and butyric acid. These materials can be used by host cells, providing a major source of energy and nutrients. Gases (which are involved in signaling and may cause flatulence) and organic acids, such as lactic acid, are also produced by fermentation. Acetic acid is used by muscle, propionic acid facilitates liver production of ATP, and butyric acid provides energy to gut cells.

Recent metagenomic research demonstrates that sustained, high-intensity physical exercise shaped the gut microbiome not only compositionally but at the functional metabolic level. Athletes exhibit enriched metabolic pathways for carbohydrate amino acid metabolism. This corresponds to significantly higher fecal concentrations of microbial-produced short-chain fatty acids. Specifically, acetate, propionate, and butyrate. These functional microbial outputs correlate closely with physiological markers of high energy metabolism and muscle turnover, such as serum creatine kinase.

Gut flora also synthesize vitamins like biotin and folate, and facilitate absorption of dietary minerals, including magnesium, calcium, and iron. Methanobrevibacter smithii is unique because it is not a species of bacteria, but rather a member of domain Archaea, and is the most abundant methane-producing archaeal species in the human gastrointestinal microbiota.

Gut microbiota also serve as a source of vitamins K and B_{12}, which are not produced by the body or produced in little amount.

==== Cellulose degradation ====
Bacteria that degrade cellulose (such as Ruminococcus) are prevalent among great apes, ancient human societies, hunter-gatherer communities, and even modern rural populations. However, they are rare in industrialized societies. Human-associated strains have acquired genes that can degrade specific plant fibers such as maize, rice, and wheat. Bacterial strains found in primates can also degrade chitin, a polymer abundant in insects, which are part of the diet of many nonhuman primates. The decline of these bacteria in the human gut were likely influenced by the shift toward western lifestyles.

==== Pharmacomicrobiomics ====
The human metagenome (i.e., the genetic composition of an individual and all microorganisms that reside on or within the individual's body) varies considerably between individuals. Since the total number of microbial cells in the human body (over 100 trillion) greatly outnumbers Homo sapiens cells (tens of trillions), (Note: There is substantial variation in microbiome composition and microbial concentrations by anatomical site. Fluid from the human colon – which contains the highest concentration of microbes of any anatomical site – contains approximately one trillion (10^12) bacterial cells/ml.) there is considerable potential for interactions between drugs and an individual's microbiome, including: drugs altering the composition of the human microbiome, drug metabolism by microbial enzymes modifying the drug's pharmacokinetic profile, and microbial drug metabolism affecting a drug's clinical efficacy and toxicity profile.

Apart from carbohydrates, gut microbiota can also metabolize other xenobiotics such as drugs, phytochemicals, and food toxicants. More than 30 drugs have been shown to be metabolized by gut microbiota. The microbial metabolism of drugs can sometimes inactivate the drug.

===== Contribution to drug metabolism =====
The gut microbiota is an enriched community that contains diverse genes with huge biochemical capabilities to modify drugs, especially those taken by mouth. Gut microbiota can affect drug metabolism via direct and indirect mechanisms. The direct mechanism is mediated by the microbial enzymes that can modify the chemical structure of the administered drugs. Conversely, the indirect pathway is mediated by the microbial metabolites which affect the expression of host metabolizing enzymes such as cytochrome P450. The effects of the gut microbiota on the pharmacokinetics and bioavailability of the drug have been investigated a few decades ago. These effects can be varied; it could activate the inactive drugs such as lovastatin, inactivate the active drug such as digoxin or induce drug toxicity as in irinotecan. Since then, the impacts of the gut microbiota on the pharmacokinetics of many drugs were heavily studied.

The human gut microbiota plays a crucial role in modulating the effect of the administered drugs on the human. Directly, gut microbiota can synthesize and release a series of enzymes with the capability to metabolize drugs such as microbial biotransformation of L-dopa by decarboxylase and dehydroxylase enzymes. On the contrary, gut microbiota may also alter the metabolism of the drugs by modulating the host drug metabolism. This mechanism can be mediated by microbial metabolites or by modifying host metabolites which in turn change the expression of host metabolizing enzymes.

A large number of studies have demonstrated the metabolism of over 50 drugs by the gut microbiota. For example, lovastatin (a cholesterol-lowering agent) which is a lactone prodrug is partially activated by the human gut microbiota forming active acid hydroxylated metabolites. Conversely, digoxin (a drug used to treat Congestive Heart Failure) is inactivated by a member of the gut microbiota (i.e. Eggerthella lanta). Eggerthella lanta has a cytochrome-encoding operon up-regulated by digoxin and associated with digoxin-inactivation. Gut microbiota can also modulate the efficacy and toxicity of chemotherapeutic agents such as irinotecan. This effect is derived from the microbiome-encoded β-glucuronidase enzymes which recover the active form of the irinotecan causing gastrointestinal toxicity.

===== Secondary metabolites =====
This microbial community in the gut has a huge biochemical capability to produce distinct secondary metabolites that are sometimes produced from the metabolic conversion of dietary foods such as fibers, endogenous biological compounds such as indole or bile acids. Microbial metabolites especially short chain fatty acids (SCFAs) and secondary bile acids (BAs) play important roles for the human in health and disease states.

One of the most important bacterial metabolites produced by the gut microbiota is secondary bile acids (BAs). These metabolites are produced by the bacterial biotransformation of the primary bile acids such as cholic acid (CA) and chenodeoxycholic acid (CDCA) into secondary bile acids (BAs) lithocholic acid (LCA) and deoxy cholic acid (DCA) respectively. Primary bile acids which are synthesized by hepatocytes and stored in the gall bladder possess hydrophobic characters. These metabolites are subsequently metabolized by the gut microbiota into secondary metabolites with increased hydrophobicity. Bile salt hydrolases (BSH) which are conserved across gut microbiota phyla such as Bacteroides, Firmicutes, and Actinobacteria responsible for the first step of secondary bile acids metabolism. Secondary bile acids (BAs) such as DCA and LCA have been demonstrated to inhibit both Clostridioides difficile germination and outgrowth.

==== Dysbiosis ====
The gut microbiota is important for maintaining homeostasis in the intestine. Development of intestinal cancer is associated with an imbalance in the natural microflora (dysbiosis). The secondary bile acid deoxycholic acid is associated with alterations of the microbial community that lead to increased intestinal carcinogenesis. Increased exposure of the colon to secondary bile acids resulting from dysbiosis can cause DNA damage, and such damage can produce carcinogenic mutations in cells of the colon. The high density of bacteria in the colon (about 10^{12} per ml.) that are subject to dysbiosis compared to the relatively low density in the small intestine (about 10^{2} per ml.) may account for the greater than 10-fold higher incidence of cancer in the colon compared to the small intestine.

=== Gut–brain axis ===
The gut microbiota contributes to digestion and immune modulation, as it plays a role in the gut-brain axis, where microbial metabolites such as short-chain fatty acids and neurotransmitters influence brain function and behavior. The gut–brain axis is the biochemical signaling that takes place between the gastrointestinal tract and the central nervous system. That term has been expanded to include the role of the gut flora in the interplay; the term "microbiome––brain axis" is sometimes used to describe paradigms explicitly including the gut flora. Broadly defined, the gut-brain axis includes the central nervous system, neuroendocrine and neuroimmune systems including the hypothalamic–pituitary–adrenal axis (HPA axis), sympathetic and parasympathetic arms of the autonomic nervous system including the enteric nervous system, the vagus nerve, and the gut microbiota.

A 2016 systematic review of preclinical studies and small human trials conducted with certain commercially available strains of probiotic bacteria found that Bifidobacterium and Lactobacillus genera (B. longum, B. breve, B. infantis, L. helveticus, L. rhamnosus, L. plantarum, and L. casei), were of interest for certain central nervous system disorders.

== Alterations in microbiota balance ==
=== Effects of antibiotic use ===
Altering the numbers of gut bacteria, for example by taking broad-spectrum antibiotics, may affect the host's health and ability to digest food. Antibiotics can cause antibiotic-associated diarrhea by irritating the bowel directly, changing the levels of microbiota, or allowing pathogenic bacteria to grow. Another harmful effect of antibiotics is the increase in numbers of antibiotic-resistant bacteria found after their use, which, when they invade the host, cause illnesses that are difficult to treat with antibiotics.

Changing the numbers and species of gut microbiota can reduce the body's ability to ferment carbohydrates and metabolize bile acids and may cause diarrhea. Carbohydrates that are not broken down may absorb too much water and cause runny stools, or lack of SCFAs produced by gut microbiota could cause diarrhea.

A reduction in levels of native bacterial species also disrupts their ability to inhibit the growth of harmful species such as C. difficile and Salmonella Kedougou, and these species can get out of hand, though their overgrowth may be incidental and not be the true cause of diarrhea. Emerging treatment protocols for C. difficile infections involve fecal microbiota transplantation of donor feces (see Fecal transplant). Initial reports of treatment describe success rates of 90%, with few side effects. Efficacy is speculated to result from restoring bacterial balances of bacteroides and firmicutes classes of bacteria.

The composition of the gut microbiome also changes in severe illnesses, due not only to antibiotic use but also to such factors as ischemia of the gut, failure to eat, and immune compromise. Negative effects from this have led to interest in selective digestive tract decontamination, a treatment to kill only pathogenic bacteria and allow the re-establishment of healthy ones.

Antibiotics alter the population of the microbiota in the gastrointestinal tract, and this may change the intra-community metabolic interactions, modify caloric intake by using carbohydrates, and globally affect host metabolic, hormonal, and immune homeostasis.

There is reasonable evidence that taking probiotics containing Lactobacillus species may help prevent antibiotic-associated diarrhea and that taking probiotics with Saccharomyces (e.g., Saccharomyces boulardii ) may help to prevent Clostridioides difficile infection following systemic antibiotic treatment.

=== Pregnancy ===
The gut microbiota of a woman changes as pregnancy advances, with the changes similar to those seen in metabolic syndrome such as diabetes. The change in gut microbiota causes no ill effects. The newborn's gut microbiota resemble the mother's first-trimester samples. The diversity of the microbiome decreases from the first to third trimester, as the numbers of certain species go up.

=== Probiotics, prebiotics, synbiotics, and pharmabiotics ===
Probiotics contain live microorganisms. When consumed, they are believed to provide health benefits by altering the microbiome composition. Current research explores using probiotics as a way to restore the microbial balance of the intestine by stimulating the immune system and inhibiting pro-inflammatory cytokines.

With regard to gut microbiota, prebiotics are typically non-digestible, fiber compounds that pass undigested through the upper part of the gastrointestinal tract and stimulate the growth or activity of advantageous gut flora by acting as substrate for them.

Synbiotics refers to food ingredients or dietary supplements combining probiotics and prebiotics in a form of synergism.

The term "pharmabiotics" is used in various ways, to mean: pharmaceutical formulations (standardized manufacturing that can obtain regulatory approval as a drug) of probiotics, prebiotics, or synbiotics; probiotics that have been genetically engineered or otherwise optimized for best performance (shelf life, survival in the digestive tract, etc.); and the natural products of gut flora metabolism (vitamins, etc.).

There is some evidence that treatment with some probiotic strains of bacteria may be effective in treatment of irritable bowel syndrome, inflammatory bowel disease, and abdominal bloating. Those organisms most likely to result in a decrease of symptoms have included:

- Bifidobacterium breve
- Bifidobacterium infantis
- Enterococcus faecium
- Lactobacillus plantarum
- Lactobacillus reuteri
- Lactobacillus rhamnosus
- Lactobacillus salivarius
- Propionibacterium freudenreichii
- Saccharomyces boulardii
- Escherichia coli Nissle 1917
- Streptococcus thermophilus

=== Research ===
Tests for whether non-antibiotic drugs may impact human gut-associated bacteria were performed by in vitro analysis on more than 1000 marketed drugs against 40 gut bacterial strains, demonstrating that 24% of the drugs inhibited the growth of at least one of the bacterial strains.

== Role in disease ==
Bacteria in the digestive tract can contribute to and be affected by disease in various ways. The presence or overabundance of some kinds of bacteria may contribute to inflammatory disorders such as inflammatory bowel disease. Additionally, metabolites from certain members of the gut flora may influence host signalling pathways, contributing to disorders such as obesity and colon cancer. Some gut bacteria may also cause infections and sepsis, for example when they are allowed to pass from the gut into the rest of the body.

=== Ulcers ===
Helicobacter pylori infection can initiate formation of stomach ulcers when the bacteria penetrate the stomach epithelial lining, then causing an inflammatory phagocytotic response. In turn, the inflammation damages parietal cells which release excessive hydrochloric acid into the stomach and produce less of the protective mucus. Injury to the stomach lining, leading to ulcers, develops when gastric acid overwhelms the defensive properties of cells and inhibits endogenous prostaglandin synthesis, reduces mucus and bicarbonate secretion, reduces mucosal blood flow, and lowers resistance to injury. Reduced protective properties of the stomach lining increase vulnerability to further injury and ulcer formation by stomach acid, pepsin, and bile salts.

=== Bowel perforation ===
Normally-commensal bacteria can harm the host if they extrude from the intestinal tract. Translocation, which occurs when bacteria leave the gut through its mucosal lining, can occur in a number of different diseases. If the gut is perforated, bacteria invade the interstitium, causing a potentially fatal infection.

=== Inflammatory bowel diseases ===
The two main types of inflammatory bowel diseases, Crohn's disease and ulcerative colitis, are chronic inflammatory disorders of the gut; the causes of these diseases are unknown and issues with the gut flora and its relationship with the host have been implicated in these conditions. Additionally, it appears that interactions of gut flora with the gut–brain axis have a role in IBD, with physiological stress mediated through the hypothalamic–pituitary–adrenal axis driving changes to intestinal epithelium and the gut flora in turn releasing factors and metabolites that trigger signaling in the enteric nervous system and the vagus nerve.

The diversity of gut flora appears to be significantly diminished in people with inflammatory bowel diseases compared to healthy people; additionally, in people with ulcerative colitis, Proteobacteria and Actinobacteria appear to dominate; in people with Crohn's, Enterococcus faecium and several Proteobacteria appear to be over-represented.

There is reasonable evidence that correcting gut flora imbalances by taking probiotics with Lactobacilli and Bifidobacteria can reduce visceral pain and gut inflammation in IBD.

=== Irritable bowel syndrome ===
Irritable bowel syndrome is a result of stress and chronic activation of the HPA axis; its symptoms include abdominal pain, changes in bowel movements, and an increase in proinflammatory cytokines. Overall, studies have found that the luminal and mucosal microbiota are changed in irritable bowel syndrome individuals, and these changes can relate to the type of irritation such as diarrhea or constipation. Also, there is a decrease in the diversity of the microbiome with low levels of fecal Lactobacilli and Bifidobacteria, high levels of facultative anaerobic bacteria such as Escherichia coli, and increased ratios of Firmicutes: Bacteroidetes.

=== Asthma ===
With asthma, two hypotheses have been posed to explain its rising prevalence in the developed world. The hygiene hypothesis posits that children in the developed world are not exposed to enough microbes and thus may contain lower prevalence of specific bacterial taxa that play protective roles. The second hypothesis focuses on the Western pattern diet, which lacks whole grains and fiber and has an overabundance of simple sugars. Both hypotheses converge on the role of short-chain fatty acids (SCFAs) in immunomodulation. These bacterial fermentation metabolites are involved in immune signalling that prevents the triggering of asthma and lower SCFA levels are associated with the disease. Lacking protective genera such as Lachnospira, Veillonella, Rothia and Faecalibacterium has been linked to reduced SCFA levels. Further, SCFAs are the product of bacterial fermentation of fiber, which is low in the Western pattern diet. SCFAs offer a link between gut flora and immune disorders, and as of 2016, this was an active area of research. Similar hypotheses have also been posited for the rise of food and other allergies.

=== Diabetes mellitus type 1 ===
The connection between the gut microbiota and diabetes mellitus type 1 has also been linked to SCFAs, such as butyrate and acetate. Diets yielding butyrate and acetate from bacterial fermentation show increased T_{reg} expression. T_{reg} cells downregulate effector T cells, which in turn reduces the inflammatory response in the gut. Butyrate is an energy source for colon cells. butyrate-yielding diets thus decrease gut permeability by providing sufficient energy for the formation of tight junctions. Additionally, butyrate has also been shown to decrease insulin resistance, suggesting gut communities low in butyrate-producing microbes may increase chances of acquiring diabetes mellitus type 2. Butyrate-yielding diets may also have potential colorectal cancer suppression effects.

=== Type 2 diabetes ===
The gut microbiota are very important for the host health because they play role in degradation of non-digestible polysaccharides (fermentation of resistant starch, oligosaccharides, inulin) strengthening gut integrity or shaping the intestinal epithelium, harvesting energy, protecting against pathogens, and regulating host immunity.

Several studies showed that the gut bacterial composition in diabetic patients became altered with increased levels of Lactobacillus gasseri, Streptococcus mutans and Clostridiales members, with decrease in butyrate-producing bacteria such as Roseburia intestinalis and Faecalibacterium prausnitzii. This alteration is due to many factors such as antibiotic abuse, diet, and age.

The decrease in butyrate production is associated with defects in intestinal permeability, which could lead to endotoxemia, which is the increased level of circulating Lipopolysaccharides from gram negative bacterial cells wall. It is found that endotoxemia has association with development of insulin resistance.

In addition that butyrate production affects serotonin level. Elevated serotonin level has contribution in obesity, which is known to be a risk factor for development of diabetes.

=== Cancer ===
The human gut microbial composition is modulated by dietary bile acids. There appears to be a metabolic link between cancer associated gut microbes and a fat- and meat rich diet. In rodents, elevated levels of bile acids produced by the gut microbiota in response to a high fat diet are associated with an increased the risk of colorectal cancer. The secondary bile acid deoxycholic acid, produced from the primary bile acid cholic acid by the gut microbiota, is elevated in the colonic contents of humans in response to a high fat diet. In populations that have a high incidence of colorectal cancer fecal concentrations of bile acids, particularly deoxycholic acid produced by the action of gut microbiota, are higher.

=== Development and antibiotics ===
The colonization of the human gut microbiota may start already before birth. There are multiple factors in the environment that affects the development of the microbiota with birthmode being one of the most impactful.

Another factor that has been observed to cause huge changes in the gut microbiota, particularly in children, is the use of antibiotics, associating with health issues such as higher BMI, and further an increased risk towards metabolic diseases such as obesity. In infants it was observed that amoxicillin and macrolides cause significant shifts in the gut microbiota characterized by a change in the bacterial classes Bifidobacteria, Enterobacteria and Clostridia. A single course of antibiotics in adults causes changes in both the bacterial and fungal microbiota, with even more persistent changes in the fungal communities. The bacteria and fungi live together in the gut and there is most likely a competition for nutrient sources present. Seelbinder et al. found that commensal bacteria in the gut regulate the growth and pathogenicity of Candida albicans by their metabolites, particularly by propionate, acetic acid and 5-dodecenoate. Candida has previously been associated with IBD and further it has been observed to be increased in non-responders to a biological drug, infliximab, given to IBD patients with severe IBD. Propionate and acetic acid are both short-chain fatty acids (SCFAs) that have been observed to be beneficial to gut microbiota health. When antibiotics affect the growth of bacteria in the gut, there might be an overgrowth of certain fungi, which might be pathogenic when not regulated.

=== Blood–brain barrier dysfunction ===
The gut microbiome regulates the function of the blood–brain barrier (BBB) throughout life, at least partially due to microbial metabolites. The BBB is a selectively permeable membrane that tightly regulates the transfer of substances between the circulation and the brain parenchyma. During development, germ-free mice exhibit increased BBB permeability from embryonic stages through adulthood with reduced tight junction proteins, while colonization with mature microbiota restores barrier function through SCFAs like butyrate. This developmental impact persists, as mice with gut microbiota associated with preterm birth show early-life BBB hyperpermeability and cognitive deficits, whereas those with microbiota associated with full-term birth maintain an intact BBB. During aging, altered microbiota composition with increased Firmicutes/Bacteroidetes ratio correlates with compromised BBB function, reduced P-glycoprotein activity, and cognitive impairment. These effects may be mediated by microbial metabolites including SCFAs that enhance barrier integrity and methylamines, where trimethylamine N-oxide protects BBB function while its precursor trimethylamine disrupts it.

=== Obesity and metabolic syndrome ===
The gut flora have been implicated in obesity and metabolic syndrome due to a key role in the digestive process; the Western pattern diet appears to drive and maintain changes in the gut flora that in turn change how much energy is derived from food and how that energy is used. One aspect of a healthy diet that is often lacking in the Western-pattern diet is fiber and other complex carbohydrates that a healthy gut flora require flourishing; changes to gut flora in response to a Western-pattern diet appear to increase the amount of energy generated by the gut flora which may contribute to obesity and metabolic syndrome. There is also evidence that microbiota influence eating behaviours based on the preferences of the microbiota, which can lead to the host consuming more food eventually resulting in obesity. It has generally been observed that with higher gut microbiome diversity, the microbiota will spend energy and resources on competing with other microbiota and less on manipulating the host. The opposite is seen with lower gut microbiome diversity, and these microbiotas may work together to create host food cravings.

Additionally, the liver plays a dominant role in blood glucose homeostasis by maintaining a balance between the uptake and storage of glucose through the metabolic pathways of glycogenesis and gluconeogenesis. Intestinal lipids regulate glucose homeostasis involving a gut–brain–liver axis. The direct administration of lipids into the upper intestine increases the long chain fatty acyl-coenzyme A (LCFA-CoA) levels in the upper intestines and suppresses glucose production even under subdiaphragmatic vagotomy or gut vagal deafferentation. This interrupts the neural connection between the brain and the gut and blocks the upper intestinal lipids' ability to inhibit glucose production. The gut–brain–liver axis and gut microbiota composition can regulate the glucose homeostasis in the liver and provide potential therapeutic methods to treat obesity and diabetes.

Just as gut flora can function in a feedback loop that can drive the development of obesity, there is evidence that restricting intake of calories (i.e., dieting) can drive changes to the composition of the gut flora.

== Other animals ==
The composition of the human gut microbiome is similar to that of the other great apes. However, humans' gut biota has decreased in diversity and changed in composition since our evolutionary split from Pan. Humans display increases in Bacteroidetes, a bacterial phylum associated with diets high in animal protein and fat, and decreases in Methanobrevibacter and Fibrobacter, groups that ferment complex plant polysaccharides. These changes are the result of the combined dietary, genetic, and cultural changes humans have undergone since evolutionary divergence from Pan (chimpanzees and bonobos).

In addition to humans and vertebrates, some insects also have complex and diverse gut microbiota that play key nutritional roles. Microbial communities associated with termites can constitute a majority of the weight of the individuals and perform important roles in the digestion of lignocellulose and nitrogen fixation. It is known that the disruption of gut microbiota of termites using agents like antibiotics or boric acid (a common agent used in preventative treatment) causes severe damage to digestive function and leads to the rise of opportunistic pathogens. These communities are host-specific, and closely related insect species share comparable similarities in gut microbiota composition. In cockroaches, gut microbiota have been shown to assemble in a deterministic fashion, irrespective of the inoculum; the reason for this host-specific assembly remains unclear. Bacterial communities associated with insects like termites and cockroaches are determined by a combination of forces, primarily diet, but there is some indication that host phylogeny may also be playing a role in the selection of lineages.

For more than 51 years it has been known that the administration of low doses of antibacterial agents promotes the growth of farm animals to increase weight gain.

In a study carried out on mice the ratio of Firmicutes and Lachnospiraceae was significantly elevated in animals treated with subtherapeutic doses of different antibiotics. By analyzing the caloric content of faeces and the concentration of small chain fatty acids (SCFAs) in the GI tract, it was concluded that the changes in the composition of microbiota lead to an increased capacity to extract calories from otherwise indigestible constituents, and to an increased production of SCFAs. These findings provide evidence that antibiotics perturb not only the composition of the GI microbiome but also its metabolic capabilities, specifically with respect to SCFAs.

== See also ==
- Colonisation resistance
- Dental anthropology
- Evolution of the human oral microbiome
- List of human flora
- List of microbiota species of the lower reproductive tract of women
- Skin flora
- Verotoxin-producing Escherichia coli
- Gut Microbes
- Cell Host & Microbe
