= 3-Indolepropionic acid =

Chemical compound

3-indolepropionic acid

Clinical data
- Trade names: Oxigon
- Other names: Conjugate acid: • 1H-Indole-3-propanoic acid • Indole-3-propionic acid Conjugate base: • 3-Indolepropionate • Indole-3-propionate
- ATC code: none

Legal status
- Legal status: US: Unscheduled; UN: Unscheduled

Identifiers
- IUPAC name: 3-(1H-Indol-3-yl)propanoic acid
- CAS Number: 830-96-6
- PubChem CID: 3744
- IUPHAR/BPS: 4709
- ChemSpider: 3613
- UNII: JF49U1Q7KN
- ChEBI: CHEBI:43580
- CompTox Dashboard (EPA): DTXSID7061192
- ECHA InfoCard: 100.011.455

Chemical and physical data
- Formula: C_{11}H_{11}NO_{2}
- Molar mass: 189.214 g·mol^{−1}
- 3D model (JSmol): Interactive image
- Melting point: 134 to 135 °C (273 to 275 °F)
- SMILES: C1=CC=C2C(=C1)C(=CN2)CCC(=O)O
- InChI: InChI=1S/C11H11NO2/c13-11(14)6-5-8-7-12-10-4-2-1-3-9(8)10/h1-4,7,12H,5-6H2,(H,13,14); Key:GOLXRNDWAUTYKT-UHFFFAOYSA-N

3-Indolepropionic acid (IPA), or indole-3-propionic acid, is a bacterial metabolite of tryptophan, found naturally in the blood and cerebrospinal fluid of humans, rodents, and other mammals.

IPA is an even more potent scavenger of hydroxyl radicals than melatonin, the most potent scavenger of hydroxyl radicals that is synthesized by human enzymes. Similar to melatonin but unlike other antioxidants, it scavenges radicals without subsequently generating reactive and pro-oxidant intermediate compounds.

== Occurrence ==
=== Biosynthesis in humans and cellular effects ===
Tryptophan metabolism by human gut microbiota ()
This diagram shows the biosynthesis of bioactive compounds (indole and certain other derivatives) from tryptophan by bacteria in the gut. Indole is produced from tryptophan by bacteria that express tryptophanase. Clostridium sporogenes metabolizes tryptophan into indole and subsequently 3-indolepropionic acid (IPA), a highly potent neuroprotective antioxidant that scavenges hydroxyl radicals. IPA binds to the pregnane X receptor (PXR) in intestinal cells, thereby facilitating mucosal homeostasis and barrier function. Following absorption from the intestine and distribution to the brain, IPA confers a neuroprotective effect against cerebral ischemia and Alzheimer's disease. Lactobacillaceae (Lactobacillus s.l.) species metabolize tryptophan into indole-3-aldehyde (I3A) which acts on the aryl hydrocarbon receptor (AhR) in intestinal immune cells, in turn increasing interleukin 22 (IL-22) production. Indole itself triggers the secretion of glucagon-like peptide-1 (GLP-1) in intestinal L cells and acts as a ligand for AhR. Indole can also be metabolized by the liver into indoxyl sulfate, a compound that is toxic in high concentrations and associated with vascular disease and renal dysfunction. AST-120 (activated charcoal), an intestinal sorbent that is taken by mouth, adsorbs indole, in turn decreasing the concentration of indoxyl sulfate in blood plasma.

This compound is endogenously produced by human microbiota and has only been detected in vivo when the species Clostridium sporogenes is present in the gastrointestinal tract. As of April 2016, C. sporogenes, which uses tryptophan to synthesize IPA, is the only species of bacteria known to synthesize IPA in vivo at levels which are subsequently detectable in the blood plasma of the host.

C. sporogenes produces IPA via a two step process. Tryptophanase (TnaA) first converts tryptophan into indole. Tryptophan amino transferase (Tam1) then converts indole into IPA.

Peptostreptococcus species with a full fldAIBC gene cluster convert tryptophan into IPA and 3-indoleacrylic acid (IA) in vitro and protects against colitis in mice. IA differs from IPA only by a double bond and both enhance IL-10 secretion after LPS stimulation. However, IA does not reduce TNF production after LPS stimulation. It also activates the NRF2 antioxidant pathway and induces the expression of AhR target genes, unlike IPA.

=== Biosynthesis by soil microbes ===
IPA is structurally similar to the phytohormone auxin (indole-3-acetic acid, IAA). Plants may encounter the substance when soil bacteria that produces IPA is present (Clostridium is known to reside in soil). Like auxin, IPA increases the growth of lateral roots and root hairs. However, it seems to inhibit some auxin-related processes such as root gravitation, probably by interfering with the plant's own auxin signaling and/or transport.

== Metabolism ==
IPA can be converted in the liver or kidneys to 3-indoleacrylic acid, which is subsequently conjugated with glycine, forming indolylacryloyl glycine.

== History ==
The neuroprotective, antioxidant, and anti-amyloid properties of IPA were first reported in 1999.

== Research ==
A study that assessed the effects of broad-spectrum antibiotics – specifically aminoglycosides, fluoroquinolones, and tetracyclines – on the metabolome of rats found that only aminoglycosides reduced plasma concentrations of IPA in rats.

In 2017, elevated concentrations of IPA in human blood plasma were found to be correlated with a lower risk of type 2 diabetes and higher consumption of fiber-rich foods. A separate study found that Roux-en-Y gastric bypass surgery increases the amount of IPA and indole sulfuric acid (ISA) in obese T2D patients.

IPA is active in vitro against Mycobacterium tuberculosis and other Mycobacterium species. It works as an allosteric inhibitor of tryptophan biosynthesis.

== See also ==
- Indolepropionamide
- Life extension
