= Indoxyl sulfate =

Names
- Preferred IUPAC name 1H-Indol-3-yl hydrogen sulfate
- Other names 3-Indoxylsulfate; 3-Indoxylsulfuric acid; Indol-3-yl sulfate

Identifiers
CAS Number	487-94-5
3D model (JSmol)	Interactive image
ChEBI	CHEBI:43355
ChEMBL	ChEMBL1233636
ChemSpider	9840
DrugBank	DB07992
PubChem CID	10258
UNII	KT0QA88913
CompTox Dashboard (EPA)	DTXSID701043787 DTXSID30928203, DTXSID701043787
- InChI: InChI=1S/C8H7NO4S/c10-14(11,12)13-8-5-9-7-4-2-1-3-6(7)8/h1-5,9H,(H,10,11,12) Key: BXFFHSIDQOFMLE-UHFFFAOYSA-N
- SMILES: C1=CC=C2C(=C1)C(=CN2)OS(=O)(=O)O

Properties
Chemical formula	C_{8}H_{7}NO_{4}S
Molar mass	213.21 g·mol^{−1}
- Except where otherwise noted, data are given for materials in their standard state (at 25 °C [77 °F], 100 kPa). Infobox references

Indoxyl sulfate, also known as 3-indoxylsulfate and 3-indoxylsulfuric acid, is a metabolite of dietary L-tryptophan that acts as a cardiotoxin and uremic toxin. High concentrations of indoxyl sulfate in blood plasma are known to be associated with the development and progression of chronic kidney disease and vascular disease in humans. As a uremic toxin, it stimulates glomerular sclerosis and renal interstitial fibrosis.

== Biosynthesis ==
Indoxyl sulfate is a metabolite of dietary L-tryptophan that is synthesized through the following metabolic pathway:

L-tryptophan → indole → indoxyl → indoxyl sulfate

Indole is produced from L-tryptophan in the human intestine via tryptophanase-expressing gastrointestinal bacteria. Indoxyl is produced from indole via enzyme-mediated hydroxylation in the liver; in vitro experiments with rat and human liver microsomes suggest that the CYP450 enzyme CYP2E1 hydroxylates indole into indoxyl. Subsequently, indoxyl is converted into indoxyl sulfate by sulfotransferase enzymes in the liver; based upon in vitro experiments with recombinant human sulfotransferases, SULT1A1 appears to be the primary sulfotransferase enzyme involved in the conversion of indoxyl into indoxyl sulfate.

Tryptophan metabolism by human gut microbiota ()
This diagram shows the biosynthesis of bioactive compounds (indole and certain other derivatives) from tryptophan by bacteria in the gut. Indole is produced from tryptophan by bacteria that express tryptophanase. Clostridium sporogenes metabolizes tryptophan into indole and subsequently 3-indolepropionic acid (IPA), a highly potent neuroprotective antioxidant that scavenges hydroxyl radicals. IPA binds to the pregnane X receptor (PXR) in intestinal cells, thereby facilitating mucosal homeostasis and barrier function. Following absorption from the intestine and distribution to the brain, IPA confers a neuroprotective effect against cerebral ischemia and Alzheimer's disease. Lactobacillaceae (Lactobacillus s.l.) species metabolize tryptophan into indole-3-aldehyde (I3A) which acts on the aryl hydrocarbon receptor (AhR) in intestinal immune cells, in turn increasing interleukin 22 (IL-22) production. Indole itself triggers the secretion of glucagon-like peptide-1 (GLP-1) in intestinal L cells and acts as a ligand for AhR. Indole can also be metabolized by the liver into indoxyl sulfate, a compound that is toxic in high concentrations and associated with vascular disease and renal dysfunction. AST-120 (activated charcoal), an intestinal sorbent that is taken by mouth, adsorbs indole, in turn decreasing the concentration of indoxyl sulfate in blood plasma.

== Clinical significance ==
Occasionally in urinary tract infections, bacteria produce indoxyl phosphatase which splits indoxyl sulfate forming indigo and indirubin creating dramatic purple urine. Indoxyl sulfate is also a product of indole metabolism, which is produced from tryptophan by intestinal flora, such as Escherichia coli. The amount of tryptophan in one's diet determines how much indoxyl sulfate may be created in the intestines. There is also high individual variability among a person's ability to convert a dose of tryptophan into indoxyl sulfate, as measured in an oral tryptophan challenge test.

Indoxyl sulfate is considered a uremic toxin. It is not as effectively removed by kidney dialysis as by the kidney itself, leading to an accumulation in those relying on dialysis. Despite cell culture, animal, and association data suggesting that it may be toxic to various organs and play a role in kidney disease progression, no effects on CKD progression were seen in the largest study that attempts to lower its blood levels (AST-120) as of 2016. Some association studies additionally suggested that indoxyl sulfate may have a role in the elevated rates of cardiovascular disease in CKD patients.

== Veterinary medicine ==
In cats, plasma indoxyl sulfate level correlates with the CKD stage. It also predicts the extent of future progression and possibly disease onset.

In dogs, plasma indoxyl sulfate level predicts future CKD progression.
