= Tryptophan transaminase =

Class of enzymes

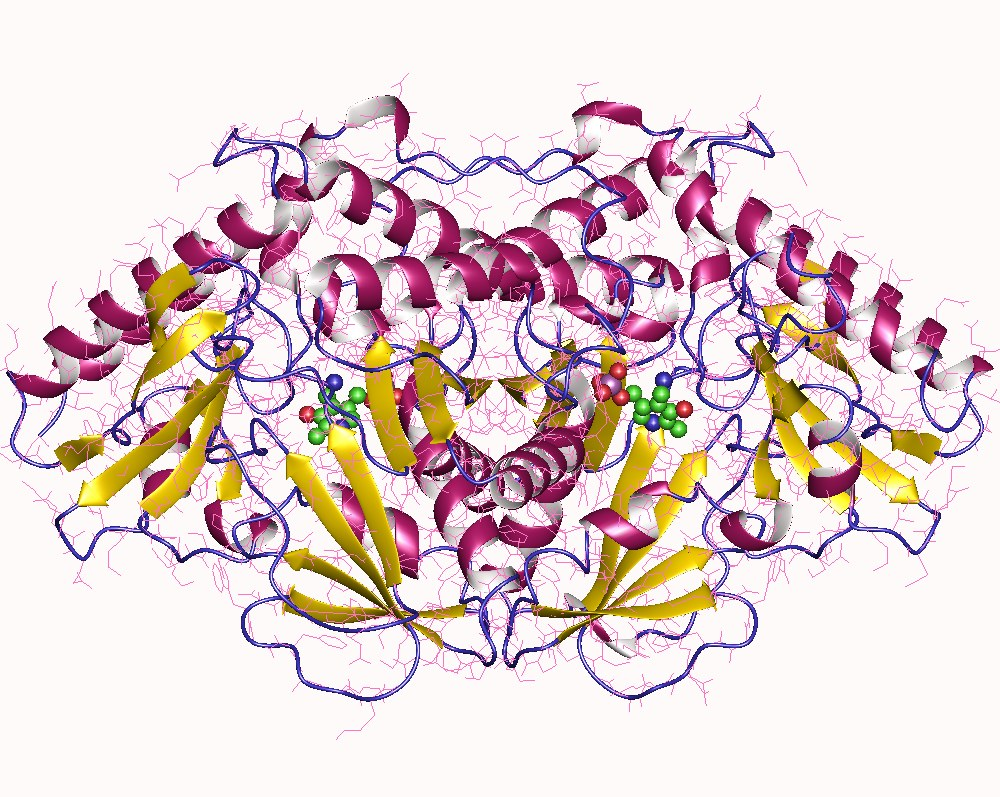
- L-tryptophan aminotransferase dimer, Arabidopsis thaliana

Identifiers
- EC no.: 2.6.1.27
- CAS no.: 9022-98-4

Databases
- IntEnz: IntEnz view
- BRENDA: BRENDA entry
- ExPASy: NiceZyme view
- KEGG: KEGG entry
- MetaCyc: metabolic pathway
- PRIAM: profile
- PDB structures: RCSB PDB PDBe PDBsum
- Gene Ontology: AmiGO / QuickGO
Search
- PMC: articles
- PubMed: articles
- NCBI: proteins

Tryptophan transaminase (EC 2.6.1.27) is an enzyme originally characterised from rat brain that catalyzes a reversible chemical reaction that interconverts L-tryptophan and α-ketoglutaric acid with indole-3-pyruvic acid and L-glutamic acid. It has also been found in pig brain and the bacterium Clostridium sporogenes. The structure of the enzyme from Arabidopsis thaliana has been determined by X-ray crystallography.

tryptophan
+
α-ketoglutaric acid
indole-3-pyruvic acid
+
L-glutamic acid

This enzyme is a transferase, specifically a transaminase, which transfer nitrogenous groups. The systematic name of this enzyme class is L-tryptophan:2-oxoglutarate aminotransferase. Other names in common use include L-phenylalanine-2-oxoglutarate aminotransferase, tryptophan aminotransferase, 5-hydroxytryptophan-ketoglutaric transaminase, hydroxytryptophan aminotransferase, L-tryptophan aminotransferase, and L-tryptophan transaminase. This enzyme participates in tryptophan metabolism and uses pyridoxal phosphate as a cofactor.
