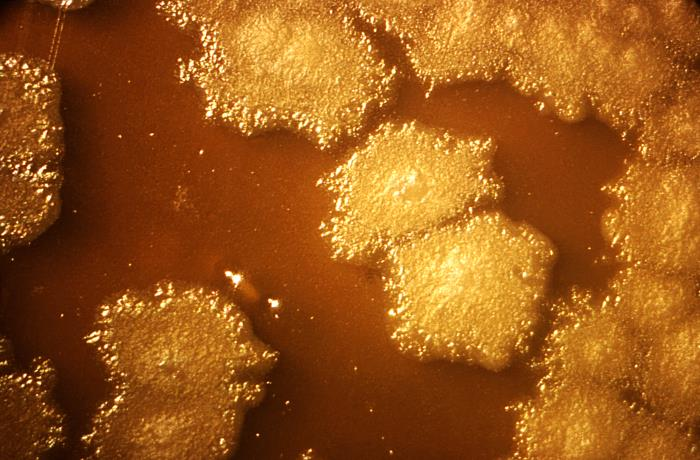

Scientific classification
- Domain: Bacteria
- Kingdom: Bacillati
- Phylum: Bacillota
- Class: Clostridia
- Order: Eubacteriales
- Family: Clostridiaceae
- Genus: Clostridium
- Species: C. sporogenes

Binomial name
- Clostridium sporogenes (Metchnikoff 1908) Bergey et al. 1923

= Clostridium sporogenes =

Species of bacterium

Clostridium sporogenes is a species of Gram-positive bacteria that belongs to the genus Clostridium. Like other strains of Clostridium, it is an anaerobic, rod-shaped bacterium that produces oval, subterminal endospores and is commonly found in soil.

C. sporogenes is being investigated as a way to deliver cancer-treating drugs to tumours in patients. C. sporogenes is often used as a surrogate for C. botulinum when testing the efficacy of commercial sterilisation.

== Metabolism ==
C. sporogenes colonizes the human gastrointestinal tract, but is only present in a subset of the population. In the intestine, it uses tryptophan to synthesize indole and subsequently 3-indolepropionic acid (IPA) – a type of auxin (plant hormone) – which serves as a potent neuroprotective antioxidant within the human body and brain. IPA is an even more potent scavenger of hydroxyl radicals than melatonin. Similar to melatonin but unlike other antioxidants, it scavenges radicals without subsequently generating reactive and pro-oxidant intermediate compounds. C. sporogenes is the only species of bacteria known to synthesize 3-indolepropionic acid in vivo at levels which are subsequently detectable in the blood stream of the host.

Tryptophan metabolism by human gut microbiota ()
This diagram shows the biosynthesis of bioactive compounds (indole and certain other derivatives) from tryptophan by bacteria in the gut. Indole is produced from tryptophan by bacteria that express tryptophanase. Clostridium sporogenes metabolizes tryptophan into indole and subsequently 3-indolepropionic acid (IPA), a highly potent neuroprotective antioxidant that scavenges hydroxyl radicals. IPA binds to the pregnane X receptor (PXR) in intestinal cells, thereby facilitating mucosal homeostasis and barrier function. Following absorption from the intestine and distribution to the brain, IPA confers a neuroprotective effect against cerebral ischemia and Alzheimer's disease. Lactobacillaceae (Lactobacillus s.l.) species metabolize tryptophan into indole-3-aldehyde (I3A) which acts on the aryl hydrocarbon receptor (AhR) in intestinal immune cells, in turn increasing interleukin 22 (IL-22) production. Indole itself triggers the secretion of glucagon-like peptide-1 (GLP-1) in intestinal L cells and acts as a ligand for AhR. Indole can also be metabolized by the liver into indoxyl sulfate, a compound that is toxic in high concentrations and associated with vascular disease and renal dysfunction. AST-120 (activated charcoal), an intestinal sorbent that is taken by mouth, adsorbs indole, in turn decreasing the concentration of indoxyl sulfate in blood plasma.

Older literature has also reported production of thiaminase I by some strains of C. sporogenes, an enzyme capable of degrading thiamine. Early studies implicated thiamine deficiency in the development of polioencephalomalacia (also known as cerebrocortical necrosis) in ruminants. However, the role of bacterial thiaminases in the development of polioencephalomalacia in ruminants remains debated.

== Clinical significance ==
C. sporogenes is generally regarded as a non-pathogenic anaerobe. However, rare cases of opportunistic infections have been reported in humans, including cases of bacteremia, soft tissue infection, septic arthritis, and clostridial myonecrosis. Similar infections have also been described in domestic animals.

Genomic and phylogenetic studies indicate that C. sporogenes is closely related to toxigenic group I clostridia (including C. botulinum) and that some strains possess the capability to produce botulism neurotoxins (BoNTs), predominantly BoNT/B serotypes. A paleogenomic study of cattle remains from a Roman-era mass grave identified a Clostridium strain phylogenetically positioned between C. sporogenes and group I C. botulinum and concluded it may represent an ancient C. sporogenes lineage which carried several virulence-associated genes, suggesting that some historical strains may have already displayed pathogenic potential.
