= Indole =

Chemical compound

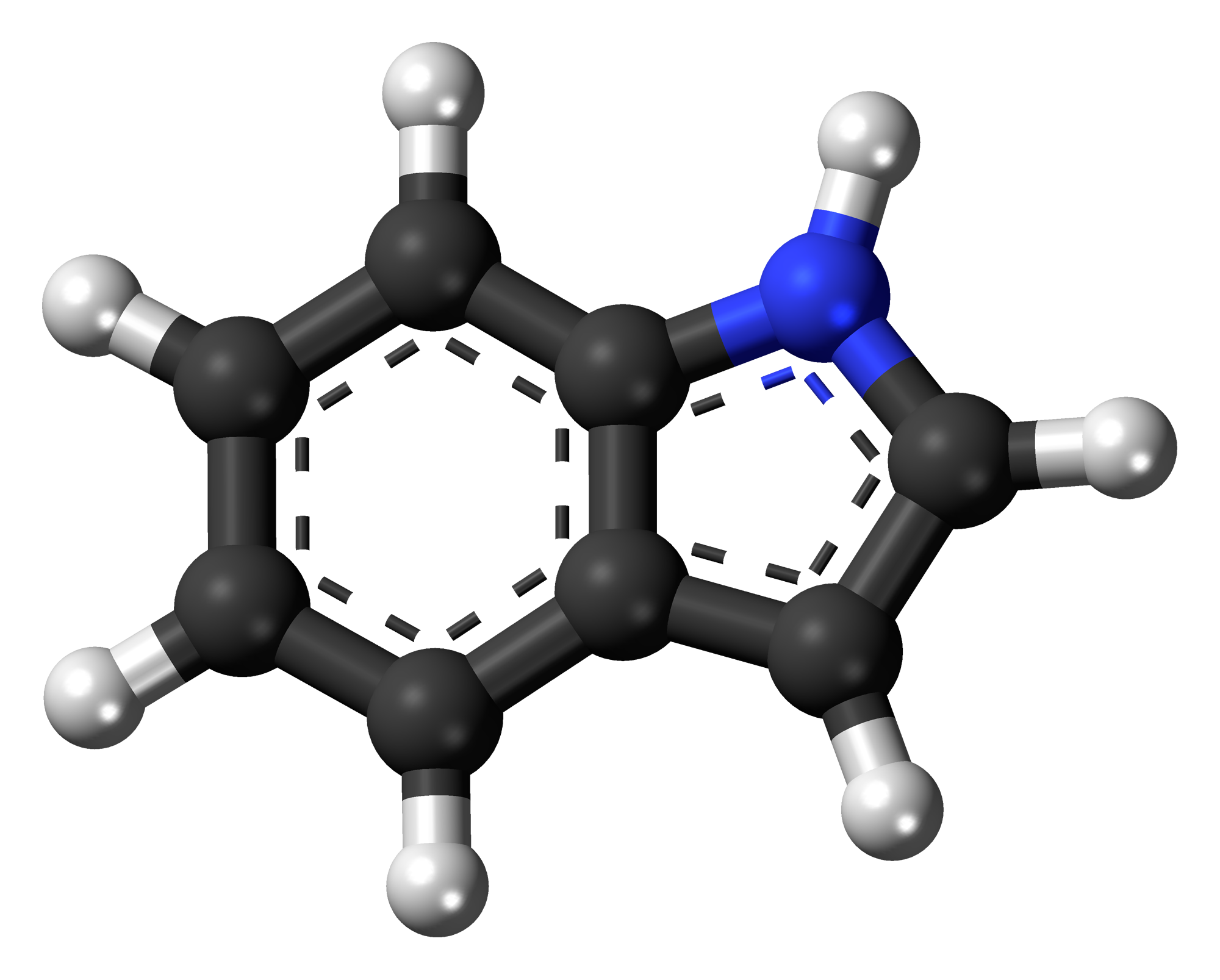

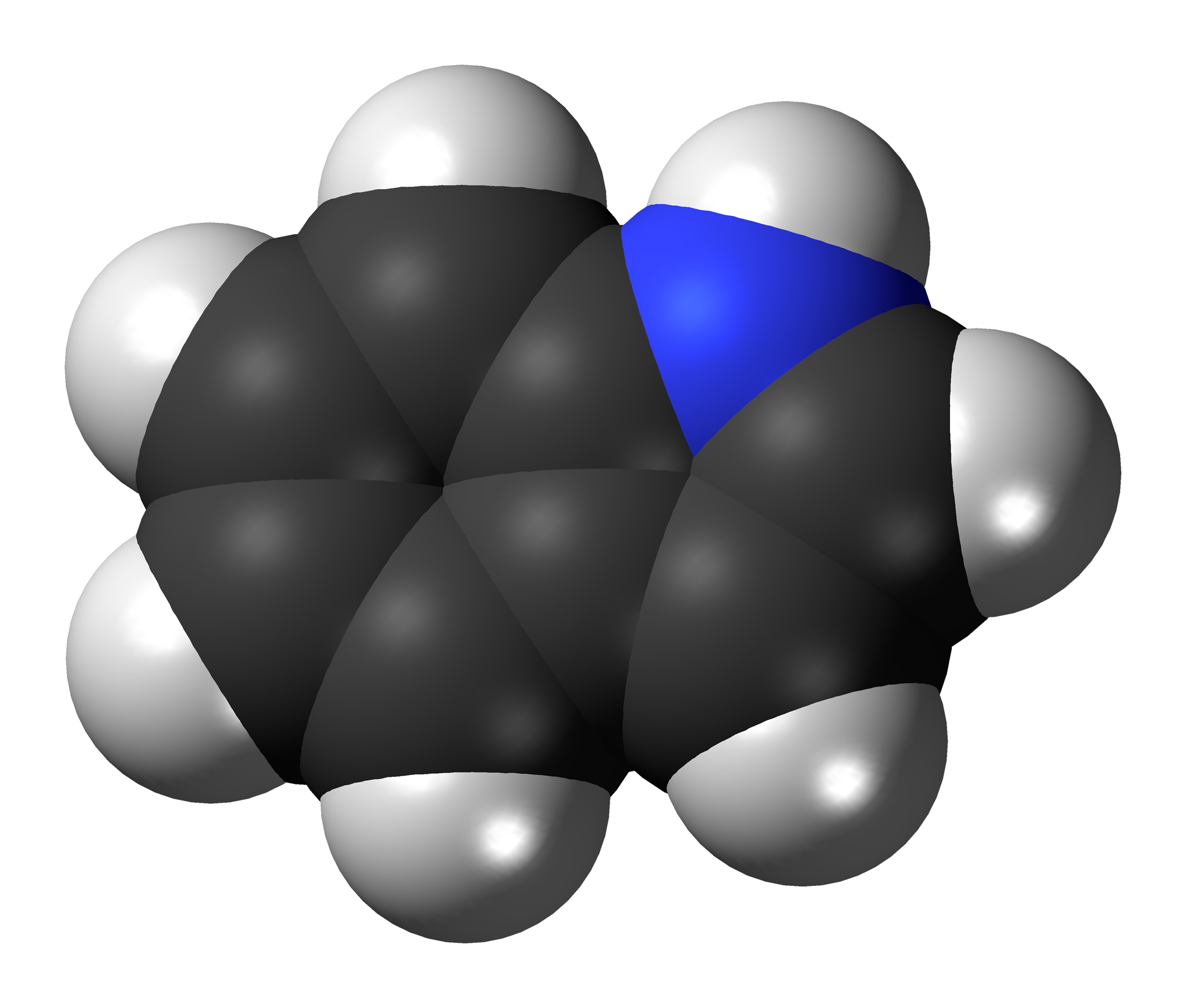

Names
- Preferred IUPAC name 1H-Indole
- Other names 2,3-Benzopyrrole, ketole, 1-benzazole

Identifiers
CAS Number	120-72-9
3D model (JSmol)	Interactive image
Beilstein Reference	107693
ChEBI	CHEBI:16881
ChEMBL	ChEMBL15844
ChemSpider	776
DrugBank	DB04532
ECHA InfoCard	100.004.019
EC Number	204-420-7
Gmelin Reference	3477
KEGG	C00463
PubChem CID	798
RTECS number	NL2450000
UNII	8724FJW4M5
CompTox Dashboard (EPA)	DTXSID0020737
- InChI: InChI=1S/C8H7N/c1-2-4-8-7(3-1)5-6-9-8/h1-6,9H Key: SIKJAQJRHWYJAI-UHFFFAOYSA-N; InChI=1/C8H7N/c1-2-4-8-7(3-1)5-6-9-8/h1-6,9H Key: SIKJAQJRHWYJAI-UHFFFAOYAI
- SMILES: C12=C(C=CN2)C=CC=C1

Properties
Chemical formula	C_{8}H_{7}N
Molar mass	117.151 g·mol^{−1}
Appearance	White solid
Odor	Fecal or jasmine like (at extremely low concentrations)
Density	1.1747 g/cm^{3}, solid
Melting point	52 to 54 °C (126 to 129 °F; 325 to 327 K)
Boiling point	253 to 254 °C (487 to 489 °F; 526 to 527 K)
Solubility in water	0.19 g/100 ml (20 °C); Soluble in hot water
Acidity (pK_{a})	16.2 (21.0 in DMSO)
Basicity (pK_{b})	17.6
Magnetic susceptibility (χ)	−85.0·10^{−6} cm^{3}/mol

Structure
Crystal structure	Pna2_{1}
Molecular shape	Planar
Dipole moment	2.11 D in benzene

Hazards
- Occupational safety and health (OHS/OSH)
Main hazards	Skin sensitising
- GHS labelling
Pictograms	(GHS06: Toxic) (GHS07: Exclamation mark)
Signal word	Danger
Hazard statements	H302, H311
Precautionary statements	P264, P270, P280, P301+P312, P302+P352, P312, P322, P330, P361, P363, P405, P501
Flash point	121 °C (250 °F; 394 K)
- Safety data sheet (SDS)

Related compounds
Other cations	Indolium
Related aromatic compounds	benzene, benzofuran, carbazole, carboline, indene, benzothiophene, indoline, isatin, methylindole, oxindole, pyrrole, skatole, benzophosphole
- Except where otherwise noted, data are given for materials in their standard state (at 25 °C [77 °F], 100 kPa). verify (what is ?) Infobox references

Indole is an organic compound with the formula C_{6}H_{4}CCNH_{3}. Indole is classified as an aromatic heterocycle. It has a bicyclic structure, consisting of a six-membered benzene ring fused to a five-membered pyrrole ring. Indoles are derivatives of indole where one or more of the hydrogen atoms have been replaced by substituent groups. Indoles are widely distributed in nature, most notably as amino acid tryptophan and neurotransmitter serotonin. In plants, IAA is a common plant hormone which is a derivative of Indole.

== General properties and occurrence ==
Indole is a solid at room temperature. It occurs naturally in human feces and has an intense fecal odor. At very low concentrations, however, it has a flowery smell, and is a constituent of many perfumes. It also occurs in coal tar. It has been identified in cannabis. It is the main volatile compound in stinky tofu.

When indole is a substituent on a larger molecule, it is called an indolyl group by systematic nomenclature.

Indole undergoes electrophilic substitution, mainly at position 3 (see diagram in right margin). Substituted indoles are structural elements of (and for some compounds, the synthetic precursors for) the tryptophan-derived tryptamine alkaloids, which includes the neurotransmitter serotonin and the hormone melatonin, as well as the naturally occurring psychedelic drugs dimethyltryptamine and psilocybin. Other indolic compounds include the plant hormone auxin (indole-3-acetic acid, IAA), tryptophol, the anti-inflammatory drug indomethacin, and the betablocker pindolol.

The name indole is a portmanteau of the words indigo and oleum, since indole was first isolated by treatment of the indigo dye with oleum.

== History ==
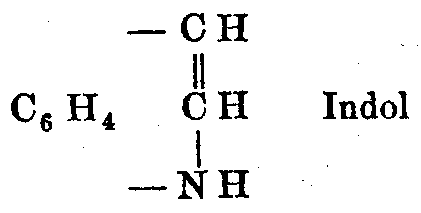
Baeyer's original structure for indole, 1869

Indole chemistry began to develop with the study of the dye indigo. Indigo can be converted to isatin and then to oxindole. In 1866, Adolf von Baeyer reduced oxindole to indole using zinc dust. In 1869, he proposed a formula for indole.

Certain indole derivatives were important dyestuffs until the end of the 19th century. In the 1930s, interest in indole intensified when it became known that the indole substituent is present in many important alkaloids, known as indole alkaloids (e.g., tryptophan and auxins), and it remains an active area of research today.

== Biosynthesis and function ==
Indole is biosynthesized in the shikimate pathway via anthranilate. It is an intermediate in the biosynthesis of tryptophan, where it stays inside the tryptophan synthase molecule between the removal of 3-phospho-glyceraldehyde and the condensation with serine. When indole is needed in the cell, it is usually produced from tryptophan by tryptophanase.

Indole is produced via anthranilate and reacts further to give the amino acid tryptophan.

As an intercellular signal molecule, indole regulates various aspects of bacterial physiology, including spore formation, plasmid stability, resistance to drugs, biofilm formation, and virulence. A number of indole derivatives have important cellular functions, including neurotransmitters such as serotonin.

Tryptophan metabolism by human gut microbiota ()
This diagram shows the biosynthesis of bioactive compounds (indole and certain other derivatives) from tryptophan by bacteria in the gut. Indole is produced from tryptophan by bacteria that express tryptophanase. Clostridium sporogenes metabolizes tryptophan into indole and subsequently 3-indolepropionic acid (IPA), a highly potent neuroprotective antioxidant that scavenges hydroxyl radicals. IPA binds to the pregnane X receptor (PXR) in intestinal cells, thereby facilitating mucosal homeostasis and barrier function. Following absorption from the intestine and distribution to the brain, IPA confers a neuroprotective effect against cerebral ischemia and Alzheimer's disease. Lactobacillaceae (Lactobacillus s.l.) species metabolize tryptophan into indole-3-aldehyde (I3A) which acts on the aryl hydrocarbon receptor (AhR) in intestinal immune cells, in turn increasing interleukin 22 (IL-22) production. Indole itself triggers the secretion of glucagon-like peptide-1 (GLP-1) in intestinal L cells and acts as a ligand for AhR. Indole can also be metabolized by the liver into indoxyl sulfate, a compound that is toxic in high concentrations and associated with vascular disease and renal dysfunction. AST-120 (activated charcoal), an intestinal sorbent that is taken by mouth, adsorbs indole, in turn decreasing the concentration of indoxyl sulfate in blood plasma.

== Detection methods ==
Common classical methods applied for the detection of extracellular and environmental indoles, are Salkowski, Kovács, Ehrlich's reagent assays and HPLC. For intracellular indole detection and measurement genetically encoded indole-responsive biosensor is applicable.

== Medical applications ==
Indoles and their derivatives are promising against tuberculosis, malaria, diabetes, cancer, migraines, convulsions, hypertension, bacterial infections of methicillin-resistant Staphylococcus aureus (MRSA) and even viruses.

== Synthetic routes ==
Indole and its derivatives can also be synthesized by a variety of methods. According to a 2011 review, all known syntheses fall into 9 categories.

The main industrial routes start from aniline via vapor-phase reaction with ethylene glycol in the presence of catalysts:

In general, reactions are conducted between 200 and 500 °C. Yields can be as high as 60%. Other precursors to indole include formyltoluidine, 2-ethylaniline, and 2-(2-nitrophenyl)ethanol, all of which undergo cyclizations.

=== Leimgruber–Batcho indole synthesis ===
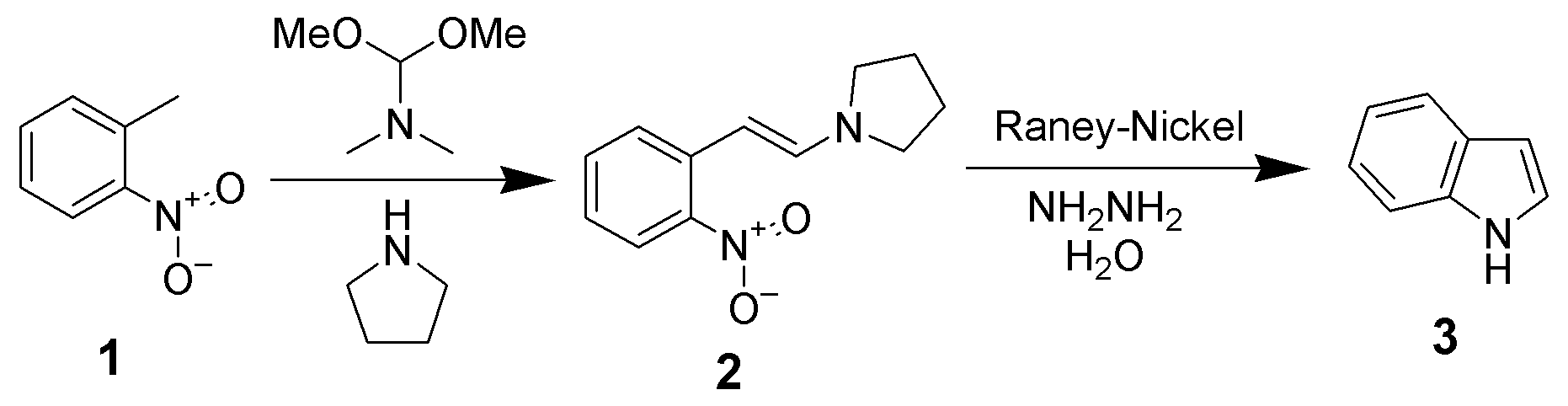

The Leimgruber–Batcho indole synthesis is an efficient method of synthesizing indole and substituted indoles. Originally disclosed in a patent in 1976, this method is high-yielding and can generate substituted indoles. This method is especially popular in the pharmaceutical industry, where many pharmaceutical drugs are made up of specifically substituted indoles.

=== Fischer indole synthesis ===

One-pot microwave-assisted synthesis of indole from phenylhydrazine and pyruvic acid

One of the oldest and most reliable methods for synthesizing substituted indoles is the Fischer indole synthesis, developed in 1883 by Emil Fischer. Although the synthesis of indole itself is problematic using the Fischer indole synthesis, it is often used to generate indoles substituted in the 2- and/or 3-positions. Indole can still be synthesized, however, using the Fischer indole synthesis by reacting phenylhydrazine with pyruvic acid followed by decarboxylation of the formed indole-2-carboxylic acid. This has also been accomplished in a one-pot synthesis using microwave irradiation.

=== Other indole-forming reactions ===
- Bartoli indole synthesis
- Bischler–Möhlau indole synthesis
- Cadogan-Sundberg indole synthesis
- Fukuyama indole synthesis
- Gassman indole synthesis
- Hemetsberger indole synthesis
- Larock indole synthesis
- Madelung synthesis
- Nenitzescu indole synthesis
- Reissert indole synthesis
- Baeyer–Emmerling indole synthesis
- In the Diels–Reese reaction dimethyl acetylenedicarboxylate reacts with 1,2-diphenylhydrazine to an adduct, which in xylene gives dimethyl indole-2,3-dicarboxylate and aniline. With other solvents, other products are formed: with glacial acetic acid a pyrazolone, and with pyridine a quinoline.

== Chemical reactions of indole ==
=== Basicity ===
Unlike most amines, indole is not basic: just like pyrrole, the aromatic character of the ring means that the lone pair of electrons on the nitrogen atom is not available for protonation. Strong acids such as hydrochloric acid can, however, protonate indole. Indole is primarily protonated at the C3, rather than N1, owing to the enamine-like reactivity of the portion of the molecule located outside of the benzene ring. The protonated form has a pK_{a} of −3.6. The sensitivity of many indolic compounds (e.g., tryptamines) under acidic conditions is caused by this protonation.

=== Electrophilic substitution ===
The most reactive position on indole for electrophilic aromatic substitution is C3, which is 10^{13} times more reactive than benzene. For example, it is alkylated by phosphorylated serine in the biosynthesis of the amino acid tryptophan. Vilsmeier–Haack formylation of indole will take place at room temperature exclusively at C3.

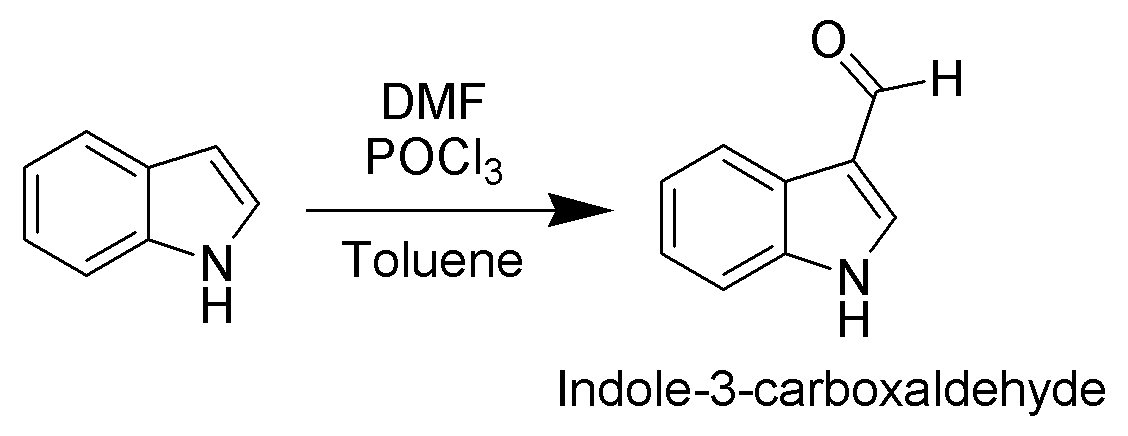

Since the pyrrolic ring is the most reactive portion of indole, electrophilic substitution of the carbocyclic (benzene) ring generally takes place only after N1, C2, and C3 are substituted. A noteworthy exception occurs when electrophilic substitution is carried out in conditions sufficiently acidic to exhaustively protonate C3. In this case, C5 is the most common site of electrophilic attack.

Gramine, a useful synthetic intermediate, is produced via a Mannich reaction of indole with dimethylamine and formaldehyde. It is the precursor to indole-3-acetic acid and synthetic tryptophan.

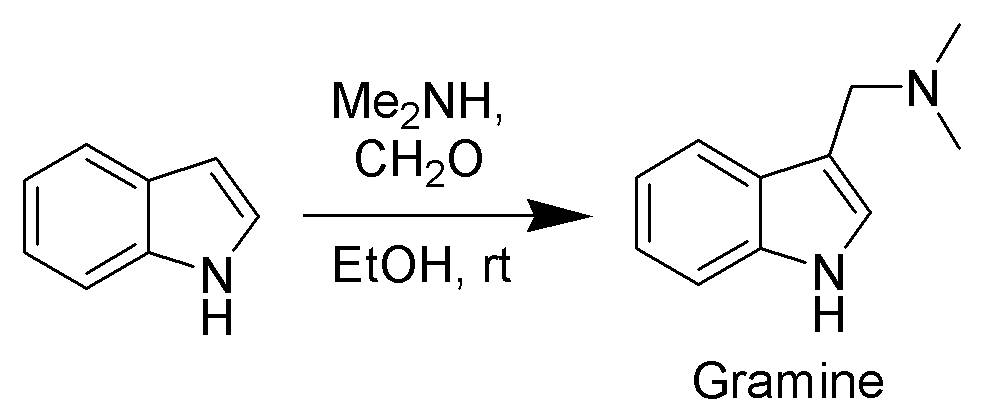

=== N–H acidity and organometallic indole anion complexes ===
The N–H center has a pK_{a} of 21 in DMSO, so that very strong bases such as sodium hydride or n-butyl lithium and water-free conditions are required for complete deprotonation. The resulting organometalic derivatives can react in two ways. The more ionic salts such as the sodium or potassium compounds tend to react with electrophiles at nitrogen-1, whereas the more covalent magnesium compounds (indole Grignard reagents) and (especially) zinc complexes tend to react at carbon 3 (see figure below). In analogous fashion, polar aprotic solvents such as DMF and DMSO tend to favour attack at the nitrogen, whereas nonpolar solvents such as toluene favour C3 attack.

=== Carbon acidity and C2 lithiation ===
After the N–H proton, the hydrogen at C2 is the next most acidic proton on indole. Reaction of N-protected indoles with butyl lithium or lithium diisopropylamide results in lithiation exclusively at the C2 position. This strong nucleophile can then be used as such with other electrophiles.

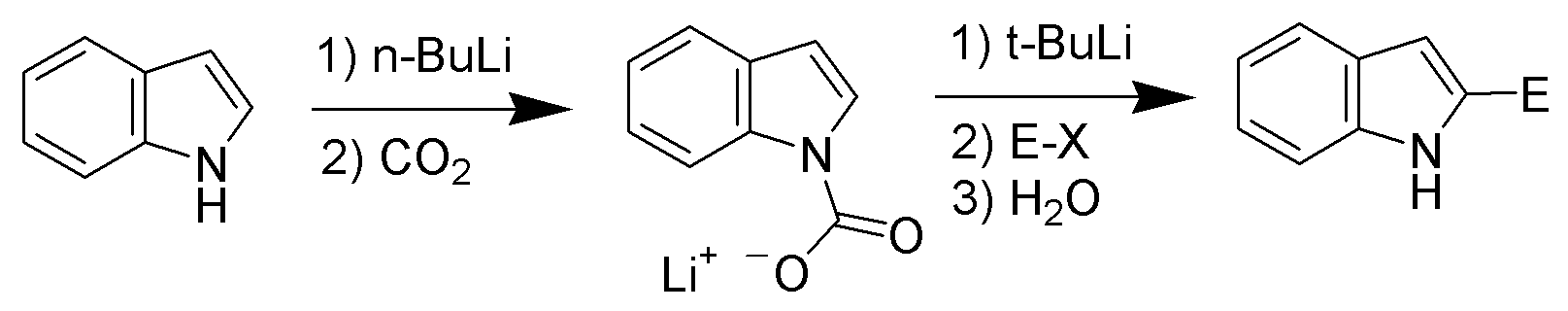

Bergman and Venemalm developed a technique for lithiating the 2-position of unsubstituted indole, as did Katritzky.

=== Oxidation of indole ===
Due to the electron-rich nature of indole, it is easily oxidized. Simple oxidants such as N-bromosuccinimide will selectively oxidize indole 1 to oxindole (4 and 5).

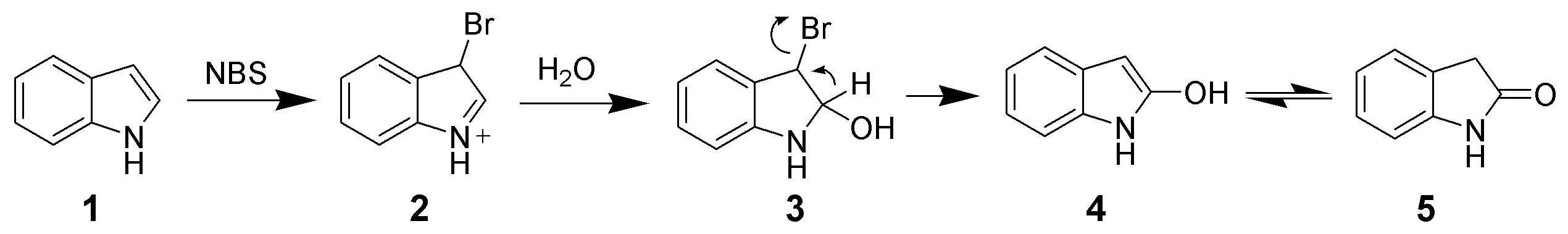

=== Cycloadditions of indole ===
Only the C2–C3 pi bond of indole is capable of cycloaddition reactions. Intramolecular variants are often higher-yielding than intermolecular cycloadditions. For example, Padwa et al. have developed this Diels-Alder reaction to form advanced strychnine intermediates. In this case, the 2-aminofuran is the diene, whereas the indole is the dienophile. Indoles also undergo intramolecular [2+3] and [2+2] cycloadditions.

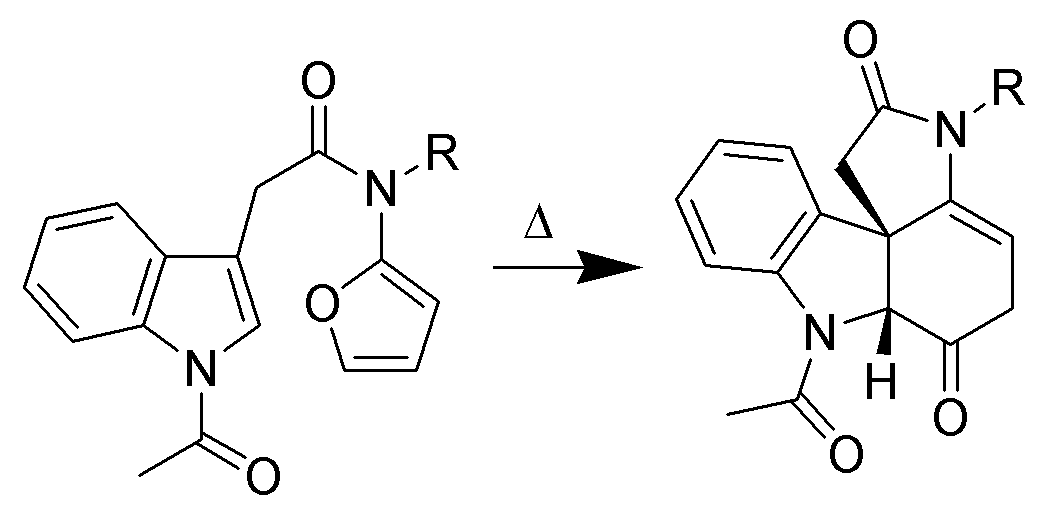

Despite mediocre yields, intermolecular cycloadditions of indole derivatives have been well documented. One example is the Pictet-Spengler reaction between tryptophan derivatives and aldehydes, which produces a mixture of diastereomers, leading to reduced yield of the desired product.

=== Hydrogenation ===
Indoles are susceptible to hydrogenation of the imine subunit to give indolines.

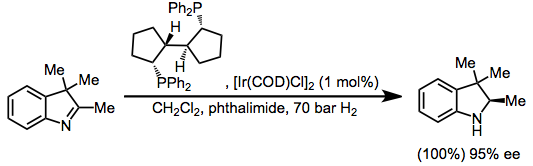

== See also ==
- Indole-3-butyric acid
- Indole test
- Isoindole
- Isoindoline
- Skatole (3-methylindole)
