= Tryptophan =

l-Tryptophan
- Skeletal formula of L-tryptophan

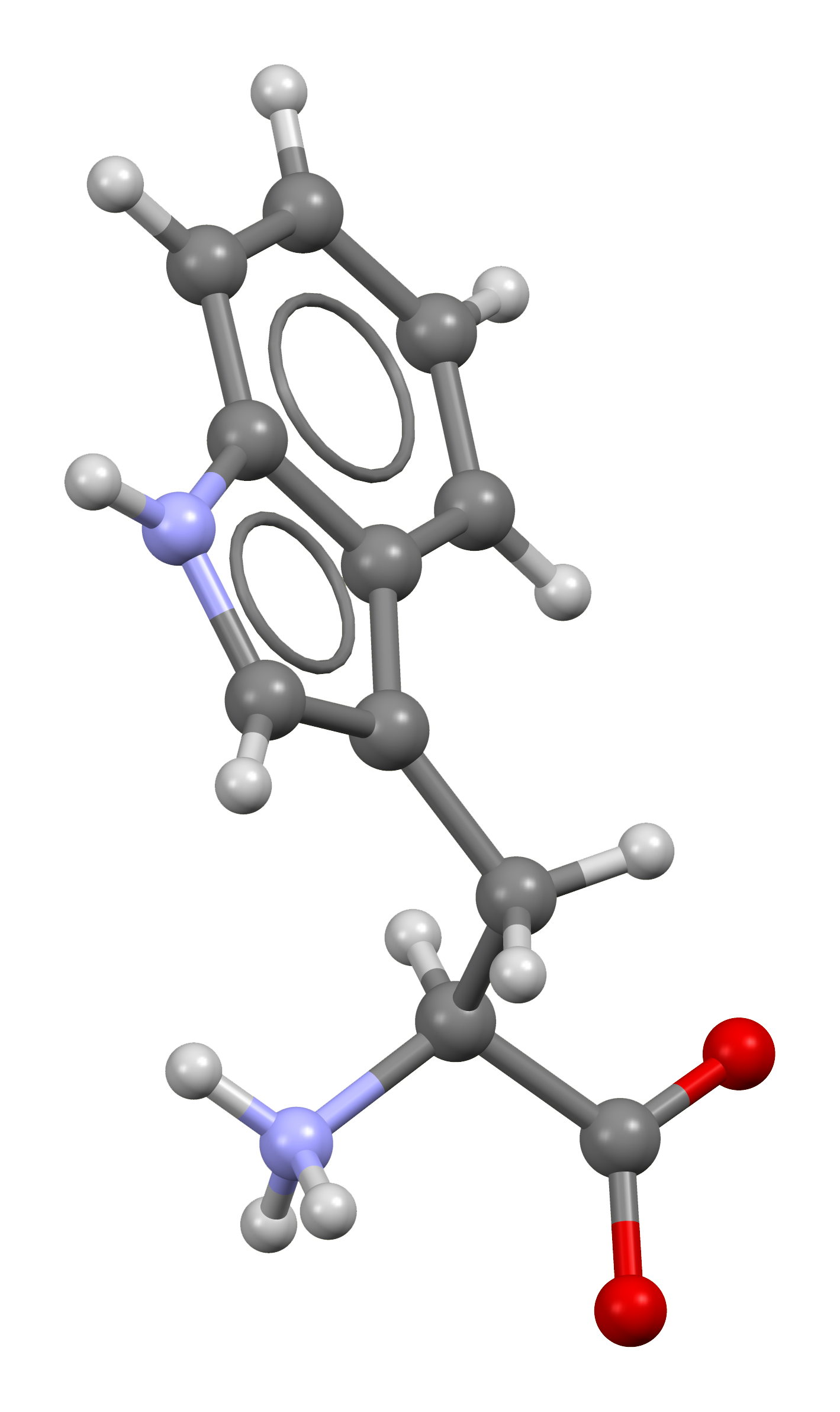
ball-and-stick model
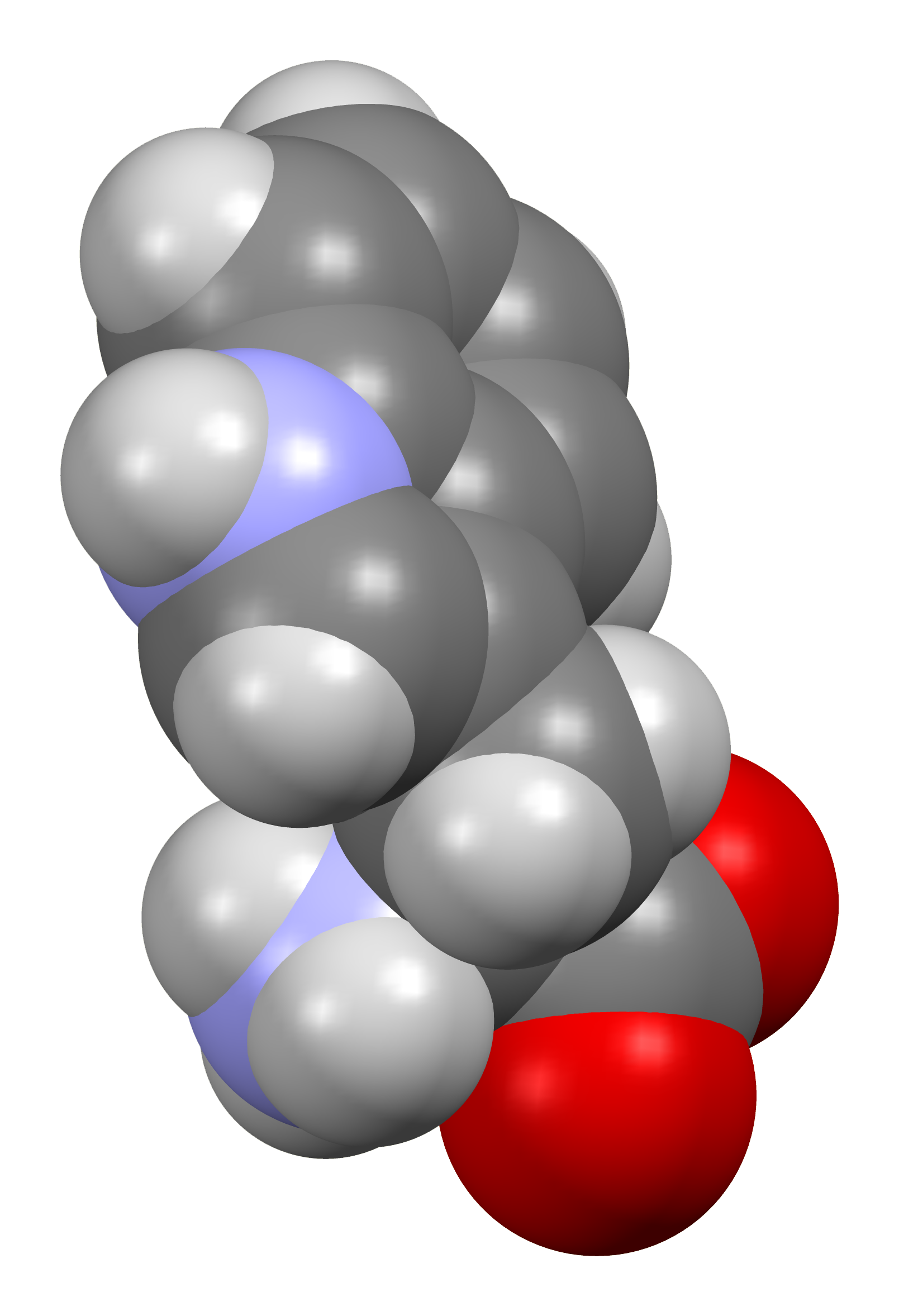
space-filling model

Names
- IUPAC name Tryptophan
- Systematic IUPAC name 2-Amino-3-(1H-indol-3-yl)propanoic acid
- Other names 2-Amino-3-(1H-indol-3-yl)propionic acid

Identifiers
CAS Number	73-22-3
3D model (JSmol)	Interactive image; Zwitterion: Interactive image
ChEBI	CHEBI:16828
ChEMBL	ChEMBL54976
ChemSpider	6066
DrugBank	DB00150
ECHA InfoCard	100.000.723
IUPHAR/BPS	717
KEGG	D00020
PubChem CID	6305
UNII	8DUH1N11BX
CompTox Dashboard (EPA)	DTXSID5021419
- InChI: InChI=1S/C11H12N2O2/c12-9(11(14)15)5-7-6-13-10-4-2-1-3-8(7)10/h1-4,6,9,13H,5,12H2,(H,14,15)/t9-/m0/s1 Key: QIVBCDIJIAJPQS-VIFPVBQESA-N
- SMILES: c1[nH]c2ccccc2c1C[C@H](N)C(=O)O; Zwitterion: c1[nH]c2ccccc2c1C[C@H]([NH3+])C(=O)[O-]

Properties
Chemical formula	C_{11}H_{12}N_{2}O_{2}
Molar mass	204.229 g·mol^{−1}
Solubility in water	Soluble: 0.23 g/L at 0 °C, 11.4 g/L at 25 °C, 17.1 g/L at 50 °C, 27.95 g/L at 75 °C
Solubility	Soluble in hot alcohol, alkali hydroxides; insoluble in chloroform.
Acidity (pK_{a})	2.38 (carboxyl), 9.39 (amino)
Magnetic susceptibility (χ)	−132.0·10^{−6} cm^{3}/mol

Pharmacology
ATC code	N06AX02 (WHO)

Supplementary data page
- Tryptophan (data page)
- Except where otherwise noted, data are given for materials in their standard state (at 25 °C [77 °F], 100 kPa). Infobox references

Tryptophan ball and stick model spinning

Tryptophan (symbol Trp or W), historically also known as tryptophane, is an α-amino acid that is used in the biosynthesis of proteins. Tryptophan contains an α-amino group, an α-carboxylic acid group, and a side chain indole, making it a polar molecule with a non-polar aromatic beta carbon substituent. Tryptophan is also a precursor to the neurotransmitter serotonin, the hormone melatonin, and vitamin B_{3} (niacin). It is encoded by the codon UGG.

Like other amino acids, tryptophan is a zwitterion at physiological pH where the amino group is protonated (–NH^{+}_{3}; pK_{a} = 9.39) and the carboxylic acid is deprotonated (–COO^{−}; pK_{a} = 2.38).

Humans and many animals cannot synthesize tryptophan; they need to obtain it through their diet, making it an essential amino acid.

Tryptophan is named after the digestive enzymes trypsin, which were used in its first isolation from casein proteins. It was assigned the one-letter symbol W based on the double ring being visually suggestive to the bulky letter.

== Function ==
Metabolism of l-tryptophan into serotonin and melatonin (left) and niacin (right). Transformed functional groups after each chemical reaction are highlighted in red.

Amino acids, including tryptophan, are used as building blocks in protein biosynthesis, and proteins are required to sustain life. Tryptophan is among the less common amino acids found in proteins, but it plays important structural or functional roles whenever it occurs. For instance, tryptophan and tyrosine residues play special roles in "anchoring" membrane proteins within the cell membrane. Tryptophan, along with other aromatic amino acids, is also important in glycan-protein interactions. In addition, tryptophan functions as a biochemical precursor for the following compounds:

- Serotonin (a neurotransmitter), synthesized by tryptophan hydroxylase.
- Melatonin (a neurohormone) is in turn synthesized from serotonin, via N-acetyltransferase and 5-hydroxyindole-O-methyltransferase enzymes.
- Kynurenine, to which tryptophan is mainly (more than 95%) metabolized. Two enzymes, namely indoleamine 2,3-dioxygenase (IDO) in the immune system and the brain, and tryptophan 2,3-dioxygenase (TDO) in the liver, are responsible for the synthesis of kynurenine from tryptophan. The kynurenine pathway of tryptophan catabolism is altered in several diseases, including psychiatric disorders such as schizophrenia, major depressive disorder, and bipolar disorder.
- Niacin, also known as vitamin B_{3}, is synthesized from tryptophan via kynurenine and quinolinic acids.
- Auxins (a class of phytohormones) are synthesized from tryptophan.

The disorder fructose malabsorption causes improper absorption of tryptophan in the intestine, reduced levels of tryptophan in the blood, and depression.

In bacteria that synthesize tryptophan, high cellular levels of this amino acid activate a repressor protein, which binds to the trp operon. Binding of this repressor to the tryptophan operon prevents transcription of downstream DNA that codes for the enzymes involved in the biosynthesis of tryptophan. So high levels of tryptophan prevent tryptophan synthesis through a negative feedback loop, and when the cell's tryptophan levels go down again, transcription from the trp operon resumes. This permits tightly regulated and rapid responses to changes in the cell's internal and external tryptophan levels.

Tryptophan metabolism by human gut microbiota ()
This diagram shows the biosynthesis of bioactive compounds (indole and certain other derivatives) from tryptophan by bacteria in the gut. Indole is produced from tryptophan by bacteria that express tryptophanase. Clostridium sporogenes metabolizes tryptophan into indole and subsequently 3-indolepropionic acid (IPA), a highly potent neuroprotective antioxidant that scavenges hydroxyl radicals. IPA binds to the pregnane X receptor (PXR) in intestinal cells, thereby facilitating mucosal homeostasis and barrier function. Following absorption from the intestine and distribution to the brain, IPA confers a neuroprotective effect against cerebral ischemia and Alzheimer's disease. Lactobacillaceae (Lactobacillus s.l.) species metabolize tryptophan into indole-3-aldehyde (I3A) which acts on the aryl hydrocarbon receptor (AhR) in intestinal immune cells, in turn increasing interleukin 22 (IL-22) production. Indole itself triggers the secretion of glucagon-like peptide-1 (GLP-1) in intestinal L cells and acts as a ligand for AhR. Indole can also be metabolized by the liver into indoxyl sulfate, a compound that is toxic in high concentrations and associated with vascular disease and renal dysfunction. AST-120 (activated charcoal), an intestinal sorbent that is taken by mouth, adsorbs indole, in turn decreasing the concentration of indoxyl sulfate in blood plasma.

== Recommended dietary allowance ==
In 2002, the U.S. Institute of Medicine set a Recommended Dietary Allowance (RDA) of 5 mg/kg body weight/day of tryptophan for adults 19 years and over.

=== Dietary sources ===
Tryptophan is present in most protein-based foods or dietary proteins. It is particularly plentiful in chocolate, oats, dried dates, milk, yogurt, cottage cheese, red meat, eggs, fish, poultry, sesame, legumes such as chickpeas and soybeans, almonds, sunflower seeds, pumpkin seeds, hemp seeds, buckwheat, spirulina, and peanuts. Contrary to the popular belief that cooked turkey contains an abundance of tryptophan, the tryptophan content in turkey is typical of poultry.

Tryptophan (Trp) content of various foods
Food	Tryptophan [g/100 g of food]	Protein [g/100 g of food]	Tryptophan/protein [%]
Egg white, dried	1.00	81.10	1.23
Spirulina, dried	0.92	57.47	1.62
Cod, Atlantic, dried	0.70	62.82	1.11
Soybeans, raw	0.59	36.49	1.62
Cheese, Parmesan	0.56	37.90	1.47
Chia seeds, dried	0.44	16.50	2.64
Sesame seed	0.37	17.00	2.17
Hemp seed, hulled	0.37	31.56	1.17
Cheese, Cheddar	0.32	24.90	1.29
Sunflower seed	0.30	17.20	1.74
Pork, chop	0.25	19.27	1.27
Turkey	0.24	21.89	1.11
Chicken	0.24	20.85	1.14
Beef	0.23	20.13	1.12
Oats	0.23	16.89	1.39
Salmon	0.22	19.84	1.12
Lamb, chop	0.21	18.33	1.17
Perch, Atlantic	0.21	18.62	1.12
Chickpeas, raw	0.19	19.30	0.96
Egg	0.17	12.58	1.33
Wheat flour, white	0.13	10.33	1.23
Baking chocolate, unsweetened	0.13	12.90	1.23
Milk	0.08	3.22	2.34
Rice, white, medium-grain, cooked	0.03	2.38	1.18
Quinoa, uncooked	0.17	14.12	1.20
Quinoa, cooked	0.05	4.40	1.10
Potatoes, russet	0.02	2.14	0.84
Tamarind	0.02	2.80	0.64
Banana	0.01	1.03	0.87

== Medical use ==
=== Depression ===
Because tryptophan is converted into 5-hydroxytryptophan (5-HTP) which is then converted into the neurotransmitter serotonin, it has been proposed that consumption of tryptophan or 5-HTP may improve depression symptoms by increasing the level of serotonin in the brain. Tryptophan is sold over the counter in the United States (after being banned to varying extents between 1989 and 2005) and the United Kingdom as a dietary supplement for use as an antidepressant, anxiolytic, and sleep aid. It is also marketed as a prescription drug in some European countries for the treatment of major depression. There is evidence that blood tryptophan levels are unlikely to be altered by changing the diet, but consuming purified tryptophan increases the serotonin level in the brain, whereas eating foods containing tryptophan does not.

In 2001 a Cochrane review of the effect of 5-HTP and tryptophan on depression was published. The authors included only studies of a high rigor and included both 5-HTP and tryptophan in their review because of the limited data on either. Of 108 studies of 5-HTP and tryptophan on depression published between 1966 and 2000, only two met the authors' quality standards for inclusion, totaling 64 study participants. The substances were more effective than placebo in the two studies included but the authors state that "the evidence was of insufficient quality to be conclusive" and note that "because alternative antidepressants exist which have been proven to be effective and safe, the clinical usefulness of 5-HTP and tryptophan is limited at present". The use of tryptophan as an adjunctive therapy in addition to standard treatment for mood and anxiety disorders is not supported by the scientific evidence.

=== Insomnia ===
The American Academy of Sleep Medicine's 2017 clinical practice guidelines recommended against the use of tryptophan in the treatment of insomnia due to poor effectiveness.

== Side effects ==
Potential side effects of tryptophan supplementation include nausea, diarrhea, drowsiness, lightheadedness, headache, dry mouth, blurred vision, sedation, euphoria, and nystagmus (involuntary eye movements).

== Interactions ==
Tryptophan taken as a dietary supplement (such as in tablet form) has the potential to cause serotonin syndrome when combined with antidepressants of the MAOI or SSRI class or other strongly serotonergic drugs. Because tryptophan supplementation has not been thoroughly studied in a clinical setting, its interactions with other drugs are not well known.

== Isolation ==
The isolation of tryptophan was first reported by Frederick Hopkins in 1901. Hopkins recovered tryptophan from hydrolysed casein, recovering 4–8 g of tryptophan from 600 g of crude casein.

== Biosynthesis and industrial production ==
Tryptophan is not synthesized from simpler substances in humans and other animals and is sourced from dietary intake of tryptophan-containing proteins. Plants and microorganisms commonly synthesize tryptophan from shikimic acid or anthranilate. Tryptophan biosynthesis starts with the condensation of anthranilate with phosphoribosylpyrophosphate (PRPP), generating pyrophosphate as a by-product. The ring of the ribose moiety is opened and subjected to reductive decarboxylation, producing indole-3-glycerol phosphate; this, in turn, is transformed into indole. In the last step, tryptophan synthase catalyzes the formation of tryptophan from indole and the amino acid serine.

The industrial production of tryptophan is also biosynthetic and is based on the fermentation of serine and indole using either wild-type or genetically modified bacteria such as B. amyloliquefaciens, B. subtilis, C. glutamicum or E. coli. These strains carry mutations that prevent the reuptake of aromatic amino acids or multiple/overexpressed trp operons. The conversion is catalyzed by the enzyme tryptophan synthase.

== Society and culture ==
=== Showa Denko contamination scandal ===
There was a large outbreak of eosinophilia-myalgia syndrome (EMS) in the U.S. in 1989, with more than 1,500 cases reported to the CDC and at least 37 deaths. After preliminary investigation revealed that the outbreak was linked to intake of tryptophan, the U.S. Food and Drug Administration (FDA) recalled tryptophan supplements in 1989 and banned most public sales in 1990, with other countries following suit.

Subsequent studies suggested that EMS was linked to specific batches of L-tryptophan supplied by a single large Japanese manufacturer, Showa Denko. It eventually became clear that recent batches of Showa Denko's L-tryptophan were contaminated by trace impurities, which were subsequently thought to be responsible for the 1989 EMS outbreak. However, other evidence suggests that tryptophan itself may be a potentially major contributory factor in EMS. There are also claims that a precursor reached sufficient concentrations to form a toxic dimer.

The FDA loosened its restrictions on sales and marketing of tryptophan in February 2001, but continued to limit the importation of tryptophan not intended for an exempted use until 2005.

The fact that the Showa Denko facility used genetically engineered bacteria to produce the contaminated batches of L-tryptophan later found to have caused the outbreak of eosinophilia-myalgia syndrome has been cited as evidence of a need for "close monitoring of the chemical purity of biotechnology-derived products". Those calling for purity monitoring have, in turn, been criticized as anti-GMO activists who overlook possible non-GMO causes of contamination and threaten the development of biotech.

=== Turkey meat and drowsiness hypothesis ===
A common assertion in the US and the UK is that heavy consumption of turkey meat—as seen during Thanksgiving and Christmas—results in drowsiness, due to high levels of tryptophan contained in turkey. However, the amount of tryptophan in turkey is comparable with that of other meats. Drowsiness after eating may be caused by other foods eaten with the turkey, particularly carbohydrates. Ingestion of a meal rich in carbohydrates triggers the release of insulin. Insulin in turn stimulates the uptake of large neutral branched-chain amino acids (BCAA), but not tryptophan, into muscle, increasing the ratio of tryptophan to BCAA in the blood stream. The resulting increased tryptophan ratio reduces competition at the large neutral amino acid transporter (which transports both BCAA and aromatic amino acids), resulting in more uptake of tryptophan across the blood–brain barrier into the cerebrospinal fluid (CSF). Once in the CSF, tryptophan is converted into serotonin in the raphe nuclei by the normal enzymatic pathway. The resultant serotonin is further metabolised into the hormone melatonin—which is an important mediator of the circadian rhythm—by the pineal gland. Hence, these data suggest that "feast-induced drowsiness"—or postprandial somnolence—may be the result of a heavy meal rich in carbohydrates, which indirectly increases the production of melatonin in the brain, and thereby promotes sleep.

== Research ==
=== Yeast amino acid metabolism ===
In 1912 Felix Ehrlich demonstrated that yeast metabolizes the natural amino acids essentially by splitting off carbon dioxide and replacing the amino group with a hydroxyl group. By this reaction, tryptophan gives rise to tryptophol.

=== Serotonin precursor ===
Tryptophan affects brain serotonin synthesis when given orally in a purified form and is used to modify serotonin levels for research. Low brain serotonin level is induced by administration of tryptophan-poor protein in a technique called acute tryptophan depletion. Studies using this method have evaluated the effect of serotonin on mood and social behavior, finding that serotonin reduces aggression and increases agreeableness.

=== Psychedelic effects ===
Tryptophan produces the head-twitch response (HTR) in rodents when administered at sufficiently high doses. The HTR is induced by serotonergic psychedelics like lysergic acid diethylamide (LSD) and psilocybin and is a behavioral proxy of psychedelic effects. Tryptophan is converted into the trace amine tryptamine and tryptamine is N-methylated by indolethylamine N-methyltransferase (INMT) into N-methyltryptamine (NMT) and N,N-dimethyltryptamine (DMT), which are known serotonergic psychedelics.

=== Fluorescence ===
Tryptophan is an important intrinsic fluorescent probe (amino acid), which can be used to estimate the nature of the microenvironment around the tryptophan residue. Most of the intrinsic fluorescence emissions of a folded protein are due to excitation of tryptophan residues.

== See also ==
- 5-Hydroxytryptophan (5-HTP)
- α-Methyltryptophan
- Acree–Rosenheim reaction
- Adamkiewicz reaction
- Attenuator (genetics)
- Dimethyltryptamine (DMT)
- Hopkins–Cole reaction
- Serotonin
- Tryptamine
