= Carbon carousel =

A carbon carousel is made of CO_{2}-sorbent panels that are spun around in the air to remove carbon dioxide. After spinning the panels are placed in a regeneration chamber where the carbon dioxide is desorbed.
