= 4-Ethylphenyl sulfate =

Chemical compound

Identifiers
- IUPAC name: (4-ethylphenyl) hydrogen sulfate
- CAS Number: 85734-98-1
- PubChem CID: 20822574
- ChemSpider: 34448630
- UNII: UN9NBX62HA
- ChEBI: CHEBI:82932
- ChEMBL: ChEMBL4530825

Chemical and physical data
- Formula: C_{8}H_{10}O_{4}S
- Molar mass: 202.22 g·mol^{−1}
- 3D model (JSmol): Interactive image
- SMILES: CCC1=CC=C(C=C1)OS(=O)(=O)O
- InChI: InChI=1S/C8H10O4S/c1-2-7-3-5-8(6-4-7)12-13(9,10)11/h3-6H,2H2,1H3,(H,9,10,11); Key:DWZGLEPNCRFCEP-UHFFFAOYSA-N

4-Ethylphenyl sulfate (4EPS) is a metabolite produced by gut bacteria, which can be toxic when present in large amounts. Elevated levels of this metabolite have been associated with some medical conditions including chronic kidney disease and autism.

== See also ==
- Indoxyl sulfate
