= Tryptophan (data page) =

Chemical data page

The complete data for Tryptophan
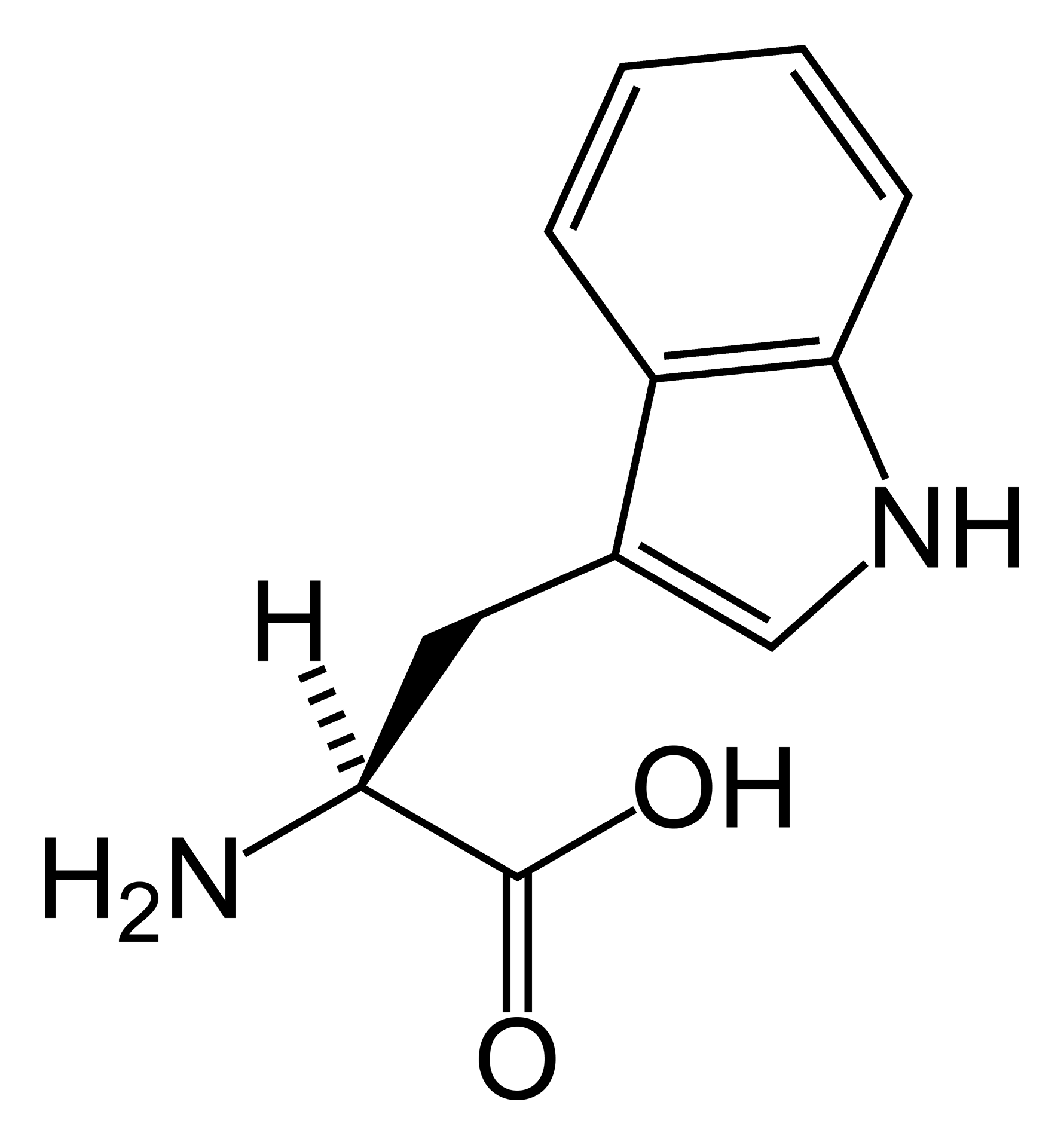
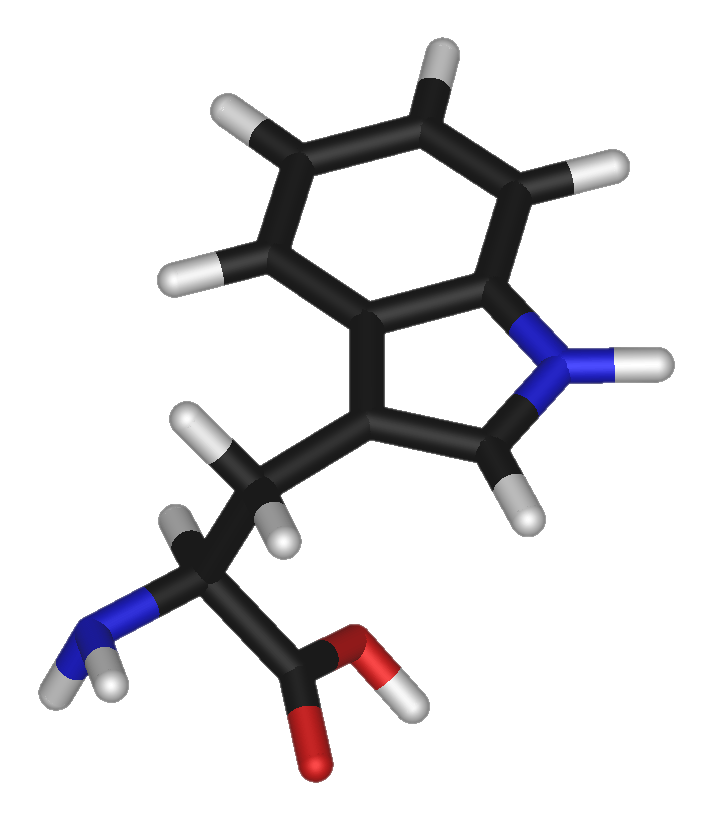
General information
Chemical formula: C_{11}H_{12}N_{2}O_{2}
Molar mass: 204.23 g·mol^{−1}
Systematic name:
(S)-2-Amino-3-(1H-indol-3-yl)-propanoic acid
Abbreviations: W, Trp
Synonyms:
none
Database data
SMILES: C(N)(C(=O)O)CC1c2ccccc2NC=1
InChI=1/C11H12N2O2/c12-9(11(14)15)5-7-6-13-10-4-2-1-3-8(7)10/h1-4,6,9,13H,5,12H2,(H,14,15)/t9-/m1/s1/f/h14H 1/C3H7NO2/c1-2(4)3(5)6/h2H,4H2,1H3,(H,5,6)/f/h5H

ATC: N/A	CAS: 73-22-3	DrugBank: N/A	EINECS: 200-795-6 ^{a}	PubChem: 9060 (D)^{a}, 6305 (L)^{a}

Physical properties

Structure	Crystal data	Spectral data: UV-Vis / IR / NMR / MS: Masses of main fragments: GMD MS Spectrum

Phase behavior	Solid properties ρ_{solid}: 1.34 g.cm^{−3} T_{m}: 228 °C	Liquid properties	Gas properties

Hazard properties

MSDS N/A	Main hazards: N/A	NFPA 704	Flash point: N/A	RTECS number: N/A

Chemical properties

XLogP: -1.3	pI: 5.89	pK_{a}: 2.38, 9.34	Tautomers:	Hydrogen bond: donor - 3; acceptor - 4

Pharmacological properties

This box:
- Except where noted otherwise, data relate to Standard temperature and pressure.
- Reliability of data general note.
