= Tryptophanase =

Enzyme that converts tryptophan into indole

tryptophanase
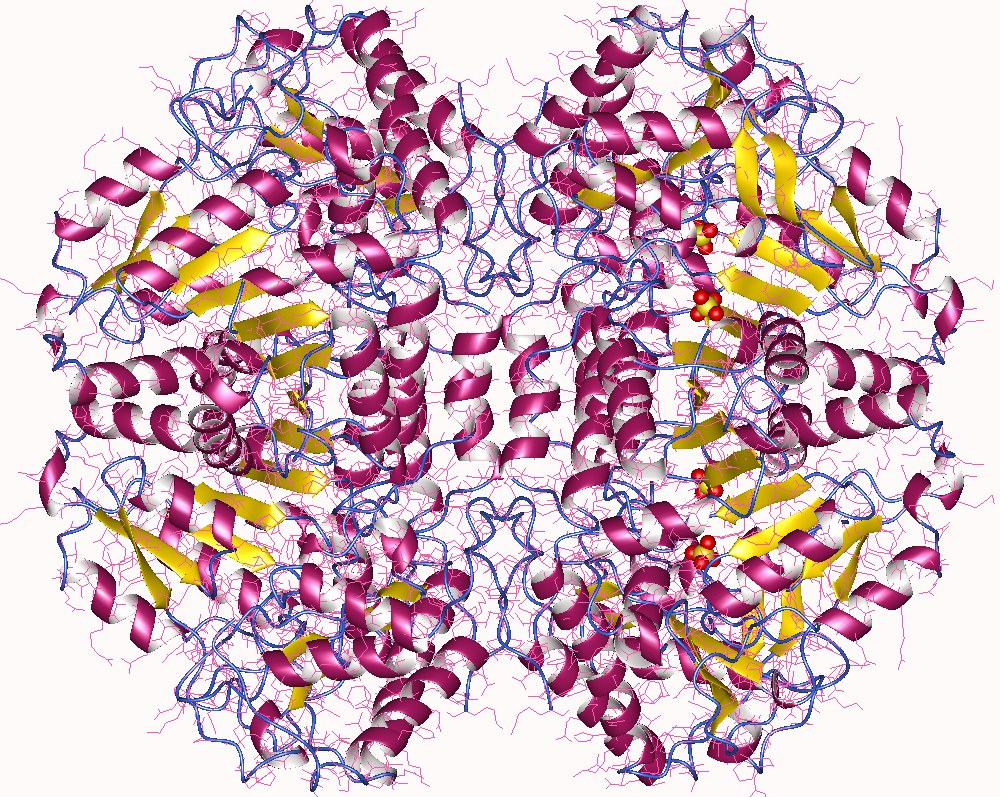
- Tryptophanase tetramer, E.Coli

Identifiers
- EC no.: 4.1.99.1
- CAS no.: 9024-00-4

Databases
- IntEnz: IntEnz view
- BRENDA: BRENDA entry
- ExPASy: NiceZyme view
- KEGG: KEGG entry
- MetaCyc: metabolic pathway
- PRIAM: profile
- PDB structures: RCSB PDB PDBe PDBsum
- Gene Ontology: AmiGO / QuickGO
Search
- PMC: articles
- PubMed: articles
- NCBI: proteins

The enzyme tryptophanase (EC 4.1.99.1) catalyzes the chemical reaction

L-tryptophan + H_{2}O $\rightleftharpoons$ indole + pyruvate + NH_{3}

This enzyme belongs to the family of lyases, specifically in the "catch-all" class of carbon-carbon lyases. The systematic name of this enzyme class is L-tryptophan indole-lyase (deaminating; pyruvate-forming). Other names in common use include L-tryptophanase, and L-tryptophan indole-lyase (deaminating). This enzyme participates in tryptophan metabolism and nitrogen metabolism. It has 2 cofactors: pyridoxal phosphate, and potassium.

== Structural studies ==
As of late 2007, 3 structures have been solved for this class of enzymes, with PDB accession codes 1AX4, 2C44, and 2OQX.
