= Secretagogue =

Substance that stimulates the secretion of another substance

In endocrinology, secretagogue is a substance that causes another substance to be secreted. The word contains the suffix -agogue, which refers to something that leads to something else; a secretagogue thus leads to secretion.

One example is gastrin, which stimulates the H/K ATPase in the parietal cells (increased gastric acid production by the stomach). Pentagastrin, a synthetic gastrin, histamine, and acetylcholine are also gastric secretagogues.

Insulin secretagogues, such as sulfonylureas, trigger insulin release by direct action on the K_{ATP} channel of the pancreatic beta cells. Blockage of this channel leads to depolarization and secretion of vesicles.

Angiotensin II is a secretagogue for aldosterone from the adrenal gland.

== See also ==
Galactagogue
