= Bioactive compound =

Chemical compound that has an effect on a living organism

A bioactive compound is a compound that has an effect on a living organism, tissue or cell, usually demonstrated by basic research in vitro or in vivo in the laboratory. While dietary nutrients are essential to life, bioactive compounds have not been proved to be essential – as the body can function without them – or because their actions are obscured by nutrients fulfilling the function.

Bioactive compounds lack sufficient evidence of effect or safety, and consequently they are usually unregulated and may be sold as dietary supplements.

== Origin and examples ==
Bioactive compounds are commonly derived from plants, animal products, or can be synthetically produced. Examples of plant bioactive compounds are carotenoids, polyphenols, or phytosterols. Examples in animal products are fatty acids found in milk and fish. Other examples are flavonoids, caffeine, choline, coenzyme Q, creatine, dithiolthiones, polysaccharides, phytoestrogens, glucosinolates, and prebiotics.

== In the diet ==
The NIH Office of Dietary Supplements proposed a definition of bioactives in the context of human nutrition as "compounds that are constituents in foods and dietary supplements, other than those needed to meet basic human nutritional needs, which are responsible for changes in health status", although a range of other definitions are used.

Traditionally, dietary recommendations, such as DRIs used in Canada and the United States, focused on deficiencies causing diseases, and therefore emphasized defined essential nutrients.

Bioactive compounds have not been adequately defined for the extent of their bioactivity in humans, indicating that their role in disease prevention and maintenance remains unknown. Dietary fiber, for example, is a non-essential dietary component without a DRI, yet is commonly recommended for the diet to reduce the risk of cardiovascular diseases and cancer. Frameworks for developing DRIs for bioactive compounds have to establish an association with health, safety and non-toxicity.

As of 2021, there are no dietary recommendations in North America or Europe for bioactives, except for fiber. However, there are ongoing discussions whether further bioactives should be included in future dietary guidelines. A 2024 review highlighted that bioactive compounds found in Mediterranean diet components (such as olive, grape, garlic, rosemary, and saffron) exhibit properties that may contribute to cardiovascular health.

== See also ==
- Phytochemistry
