= Sorbent =

Material that absorbs or adsorbs

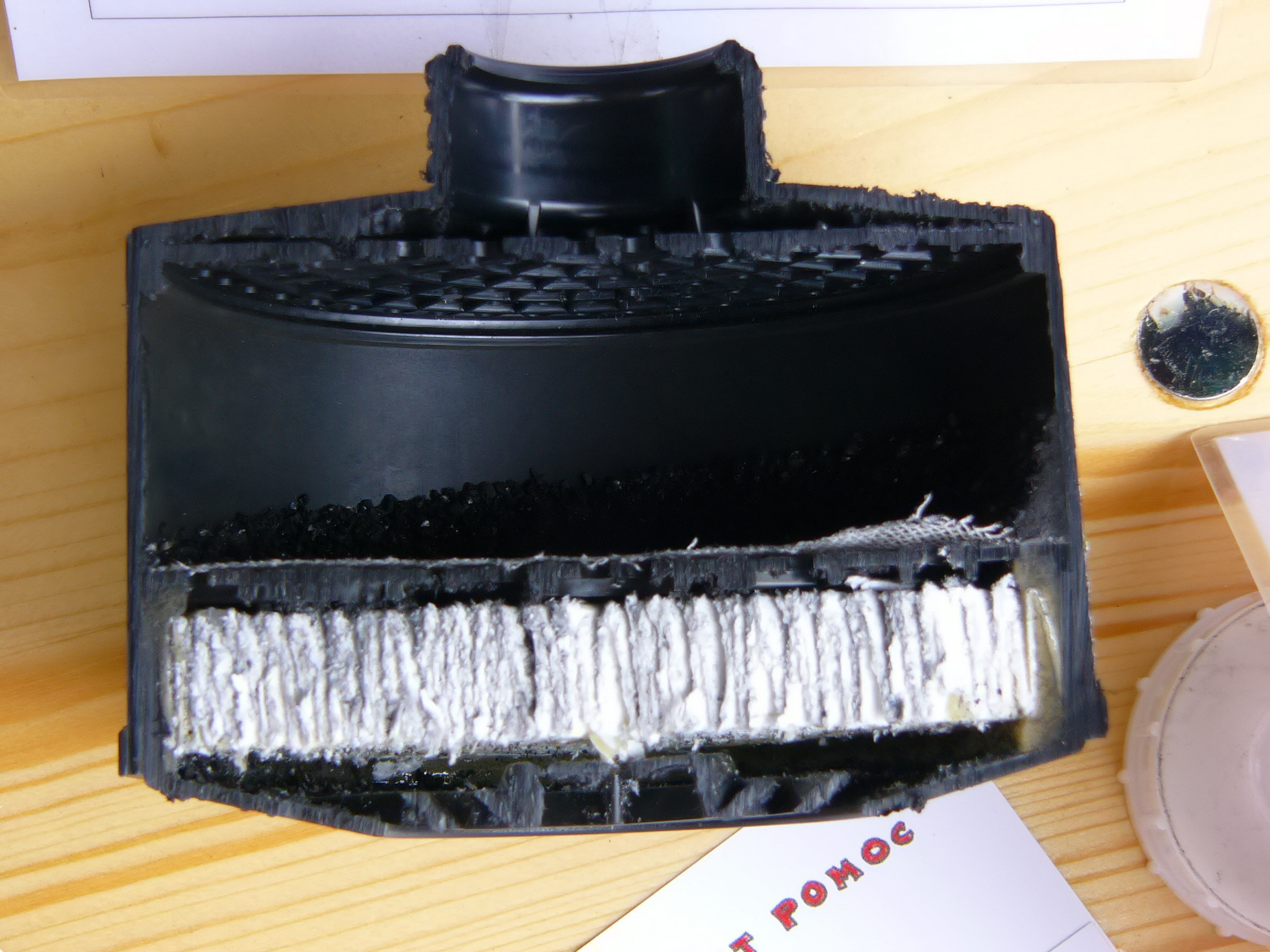
Cross-section of a gas mask filter, with sorbent material visible

A sorbent is an insoluble material that either absorbs or adsorbs liquids or gases. They are frequently used to remove pollutants and in the cleanup of chemical accidents and oil spills. Besides their uses in industry, sorbents are used in commercial products such as diapers and odor absorbents, and are researched for applications in environmental air analysis, particularly in the analysis of volatile organic compounds. The name sorbent is derived from sorption, which is itself a derivation from adsorption and absorption.

== Mechanism of action ==
Sorbents collect specific liquids or gases depending on the composition of the material being used in the sorbent. Some of the most common sorbents used to clean oil spills are made from materials that are both oleophilic and hydrophobic, have high surface area through structural designs that include pores and capillaries, and draw in liquid through capillary action. Sorbents may be used to collect undesirable ions and act like a reusable ion-exchange resin, composed of charged layers of material that can be heated or otherwise treated to remove pollutants. In this and similar cases, pollutant particles are attracted to the sorbent through electrostatic forces. Some sorbents chemically bind to particles through chemical adsorption, or chemisorption; this process is often more difficult to reverse.

== Examples ==
Sorbents come in various forms and materials, including:

- Activated carbon, the most widely used sorbent, which has been known and manufactured since the 19th century,
- Molecular sieves, commonly made from zeolite,
- Sponges, which absorb liquid in a network of open cells,
- Polypropylene fiber mats, which can be employed to absorb oil,
- Cellulose fiber products used for oil or chemical sorption,
- Superabsorbent polymer, the granular gel material most commonly found in diapers, capable of absorbing multiple times its original weight in urine,
- Incontinence pads, which may also incorporate nonwoven fabric as a sorbent, and
- Desiccants, which attract water, thereby drying (desiccating) surrounding materials.
