= Trp operon =

Operon that codes for the components for production of tryptophan

Structure of the trp operon

The trp operon is a group of genes that are transcribed together, encoding the enzymes that produce the amino acid tryptophan in bacteria. The trp operon was first characterized in Escherichia coli, and it has since been discovered in many other bacteria. The operon is regulated so that, when tryptophan is present in the environment, the genes for tryptophan synthesis are repressed.

This TRP operon diagram shows a negative feedback loop by a repressible operon— this is a genetic control system where the default state of gene expression is on but it can be turned off by a specific molecule. I. TRP levels are low and therefore transcription occurs. 1.DNA 2.Regulatory Gene 3.Promoter 4.Operator 5.TRP Structural Genes 6.Terminator 7.RNA Polymerase 8.TRP Proteins 9.DNA is transcribed to make mRNA, which gets translated into a repressor protein. 10.Repressor protein 11.The repressor protein cannot bind to the operator 12.Transcription occurs 13.TRP structural genes are transcribed to make mRNA, which gets translated into TRP Proteins II.TRP levels are high and therefore transcription is blocked. 14.A corepressor molecule 15.Active repressor protein 16.The active repressor protein binds into the operator and stops transcription

The trp operon contains five structural genes: trpE, trpD, trpC, trpB, and trpA, which encode the enzymes needed to synthesize tryptophan. It also contains a repressive regulator gene called trpR. When tryptophan is present, the trpR protein binds to the operator, blocking transcription of the trp operon by RNA polymerase.

This operon is an example of repressible negative regulation of gene expression. The repressor protein binds to the operator in the presence of tryptophan (repressing transcription) and is released from the operon when tryptophan is absent (allowing transcription to proceed). The trp operon additionally uses attenuation to control expression of the operon, a second negative feedback control mechanism.

The trp operon is well-studied and is commonly used as an example of gene regulation in bacteria alongside the lac operon.

== Genes ==
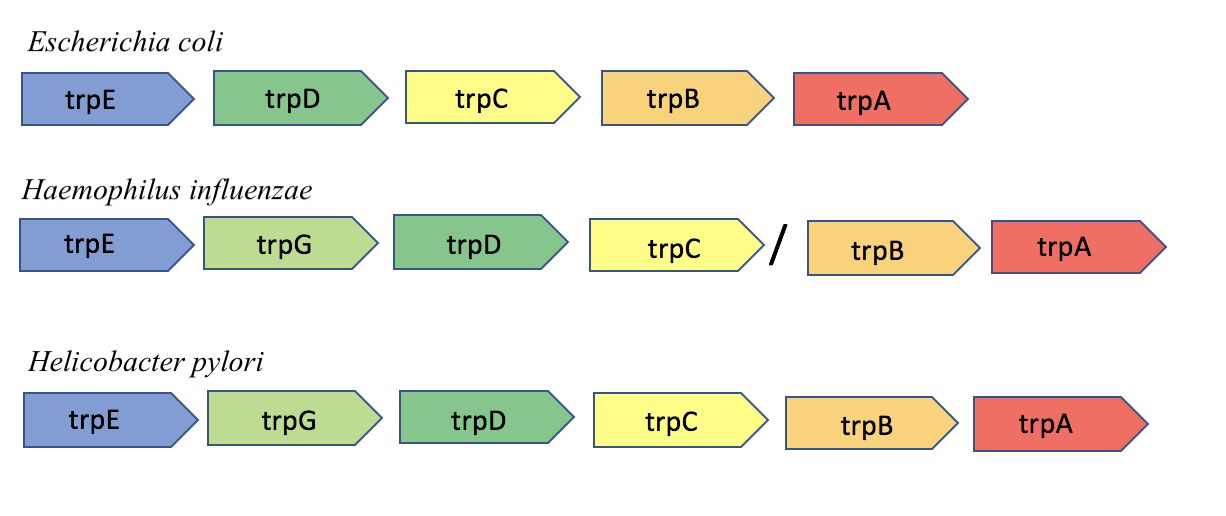
The composition of the genes within the trp operon among three specific bacterial species.

trp operon contains five structural genes. The roles of their products are:

- TrpE (P00895): Anthranilate synthase produces anthranilate.
- TrpD (P00904): Cooperates with TrpE.
- TrpC (P00909): Phosphoribosylanthranilate isomerase domain first turns N-(5-phospho-β-D-ribosyl)anthranilate into 1-(2-carboxyphenylamino)-1-deoxy-D-ribulose 5-phosphate. The Indole-3-glycerol-phosphate synthase on the same protein then turns the product into (1S,2R)-1-C-(indol-3-yl)glycerol 3-phosphate.
- TrpA (P0A877), TrpB (P0A879): two subunits of tryptophan synthetase. Combines TrpC's product with serine to produce tryptophan.

Reactions catalyzed by the enzymes synthesized from the trp operon.

== Repression ==
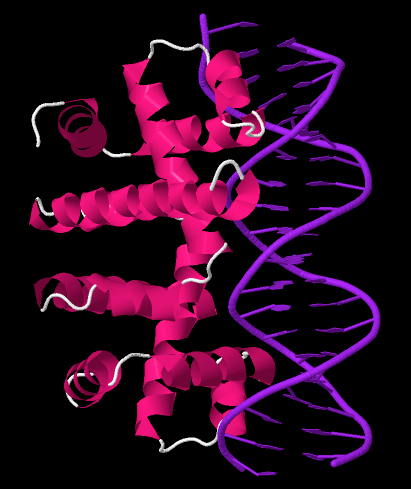
Trp repressor dimer bound to operator DNA

The operon operates by a negative repressible feedback mechanism. The repressor for the trp operon is produced upstream by the trpR gene, which is constitutively expressed at a low level. Synthesized trpR monomers associate into dimers. When tryptophan is present, these tryptophan repressor dimers bind to tryptophan, causing a change in the repressor conformation, allowing the repressor to bind to the operator. This prevents RNA polymerase from binding to and transcribing the operon, so tryptophan is not produced from its precursor. When tryptophan is not present, the repressor is in its inactive conformation and cannot bind the operator region, so transcription is not inhibited by the repressor.

== Attenuation ==
Mechanism of transcriptional attenuation of the trp operon.

Attenuation is a second mechanism of negative feedback in the trp operon. The repression system targets the intracellular trp concentration whereas the attenuation responds to the concentration of charged tRNA^{trp}. Thus, the repressor (the trpR protein) decreases gene expression by altering the initiation of transcription, while attenuation does so by altering the process of transcription that's already in progress. While the TrpR repressor decreases transcription by a factor of 70, attenuation can further decrease it by a factor of 10, thus allowing accumulated repression of about 700-fold. Attenuation is made possible by the fact that in prokaryotes (which have no nucleus), the ribosomes begin translating the mRNA while RNA polymerase is still transcribing the DNA sequence. This allows the process of translation to affect transcription of the operon directly.

At the beginning of the transcribed genes of the trp operon is a sequence of at least 130 nucleotides termed the leader transcript (trpL; P0AD92). Lee and Yanofsky (1977) found that the attenuation efficiency is correlated with the stability of a secondary structure embedded in trpL, and the 2 constituent hairpins of the terminator structure were later elucidated by Oxender et al. (1979). This transcript includes four short sequences designated 1–4, each of which is partially complementary to the next one. Thus, three distinct secondary structures (hairpins) can form: 1–2, 2–3 or 3–4. The hybridization of sequences 1 and 2 to form the 1–2 structure is rare because the RNA polymerase waits for a ribosome to attach before continuing transcription past sequence 1, however if the 1–2 hairpin were to form it would prevent the formation of the 2–3 structure (but not 3–4). The formation of a hairpin loop between sequences 2–3 prevents the formation of hairpin loops between both 1–2 and 3–4. The 3–4 structure is a transcription termination sequence (abundant in G/C and immediately followed by several uracil residues), once it forms RNA polymerase will disassociate from the DNA and transcription of the structural genes of the operon can not occur (see below for a more detailed explanation). The functional importance of the 2nd hairpin for the transcriptional termination is illustrated by the reduced transcription termination frequency observed in experiments destabilizing the central G+C pairing of this hairpin.

Part of the leader transcript codes for a short polypeptide of 14 amino acids, termed the leader peptide. This peptide contains two adjacent tryptophan residues, which is unusual, since tryptophan is a fairly uncommon amino acid (about one in a hundred residues in a typical E. coli protein is tryptophan). The strand 1 in trpL encompasses the region encoding the trailing residues of the leader peptide: Trp, Trp, Arg, Thr, Ser; conservation is observed in these 5 codons whereas mutating the upstream codons do not alter the operon expression. If the ribosome attempts to translate this peptide while tryptophan levels in the cell are low, it will stall at either of the two trp codons. While it is stalled, the ribosome physically shields sequence 1 of the transcript, preventing the formation of the 1–2 secondary structure. Sequence 2 is then free to hybridize with sequence 3 to form the 2–3 structure, which then prevents the formation of the 3–4 termination hairpin, which is why the 2–3 structure is called an anti-termination hairpin. In the presence of the 2–3 structure, RNA polymerase is free to continue transcribing the operon. Mutational analysis and studies involving complementary oligonucleotides demonstrate that the stability of the 2–3 structure corresponds to the operon expression level. If tryptophan levels in the cell are high, the ribosome will translate the entire leader peptide without interruption and will only stall during translation termination at the stop codon. At this point the ribosome physically shields both sequences 1 and 2. Sequences 3 and 4 are thus free to form the 3–4 structure which terminates transcription. This terminator structure forms when no ribosome stalls in the vicinity of the Trp tandem (i.e. Trp or Arg codon): either the leader peptide is not translated or the translation proceeds smoothly along the strand 1 with abundant charged tRNAtrp. More over, the ribosome is proposed to only block about 10 nts downstream, thus ribosome stalling in either the upstream Gly or further downstream Thr do not seem to affect the formation of the termination hairpin. The end result is that the operon will be transcribed only when tryptophan is unavailable for the ribosome, while the trpL transcript is constitutively expressed.

This attenuation mechanism is experimentally supported. First, the translation of the leader peptide and ribosomal stalling are directly evidenced to be necessary for inhibiting the transcription termination. Moreover, mutational analysis destabilizing or disrupting the base-pairing of the antiterminator hairpin results in increased termination of several folds; consistent with the attenuation model, this mutation fails to relieve attenuation even with starved Trp. In contrast, complementary oligonucleotides targeting strand 1 increases the operon expression by promoting the antiterminator formation. Furthermore, in histidine operon, compensatory mutation shows that the pairing ability of strands 2–3 matters more than their primary sequence in inhibiting attenuation.

In attenuation, where the translating ribosome is stalled determines whether the termination hairpin will be formed. In order for the transcribing polymerase to concomitantly capture the alternative structure, the time scale of the structural modulation must be comparable to that of the transcription. To ensure that the ribosome binds and begins translation of the leader transcript immediately following its synthesis, a pause site exists in the trpL sequence. Upon reaching this site, RNA polymerase pauses transcription and apparently waits for translation to begin. This mechanism allows for synchronization of transcription and translation, a key element in attenuation.

A similar attenuation mechanism regulates the synthesis of histidine, phenylalanine and threonine.

== Regulation of trp operon in Bacillus subtilis ==
The arrangement of the trp operon in E. coli and Bacillus subtilis differs. There are 5 structural genes in E. coli that are found under a single transcriptional unit. In Bacillus subtilis, there are 6 structural genes that are situated within a supraoperon. Three of these genes are found upstream while the other three genes are found downstream of the trp operon. There is a 7th gene in Bacillus subtilis's operon called trpG or pabA which is responsible for protein synthesis of tryptophan and folate. Regulation of trp operons in both organisms depends on the amount of tryptophan present in the cell. However, the primary regulation of tryptophan biosynthesis in B. subtilis is via attenuation, rather than repression, of transcription. In B. subtilis, tryptophan binds to the eleven-subunit tryptophan-activated RNA-binding attenuation protein (TRAP), which activates TRAP's ability to bind to the trp leader RNA. Binding of trp-activated TRAP to leader RNA results in the formation of a terminator structure that causes transcription termination. In addition, the activated TRAP inhibits the initiation of translation of trpP, trpE, trpG and ycbK genes. The gene trpP plays a role in trp transportation, while the gene trpG is utilized in the folate operon, and the gene ycbK is involved in synthesis of an efflux protein. The activated TRAP protein is regulated by an anti-TRAP (AT) protein and AT synthesis. AT can bind to tryptophan-activated TRAP and prevent it from binding to RNA, therefore upregulating expression of the trp operon by preventing early termination.
