= C7orf57 =

Uncharacterized protein in humans

Identifiers
- Aliases: C7orf57, chromosome 7 open reading frame 57
- External IDs: MGI: 3651127; GeneCards: C7orf57

Gene location (Human)
Chr.	Chromosome 7 (human)
Band	7p12.3	Start	48,035,511 bp
Band	7p12.3	End	48,061,304 bp

Gene location (Mouse)
Chr.	Chromosome 11 (mouse)
Band	11|11 A1	Start	8,998,594 bp
Band	11|11 A1	End	9,019,356 bp
RNA expression pattern
Bgee	Human / Mouse (ortholog); Top expressed in: bronchial epithelial cell; mucosa of paranasal sinus; right uterine tube; olfactory zone of nasal mucosa; epithelium of nasopharynx; caput epididymis; gonad; nasal epithelium; right lung; ventricular zone / Top expressed in: olfactory epithelium; spermatocyte; spermatid; right kidney; proximal tubule; lip; human kidney; esophagus; embryo; skin of external ear; More reference expression data
BioGPS	n/a
Orthologs
Databases	NCBI: entry; OMA: entry
Species	Human	Mouse
Entrez	136288	626870
Ensembl	ENSG00000164746	ENSMUSG00000040978
UniProt	Q8NEG2	Q5SS90
RefSeq (mRNA)	NM_001100159; NM_001267865; NM_001267866	NM_001037928
RefSeq (protein)	NP_001093629; NP_001254794; NP_001254795	NP_001033017
Location (UCSC)	Chr 7: 48.04 – 48.06 Mb	Chr 11: 9 – 9.02 Mb
PubMed search
- Wikidata
View/Edit Human	View/Edit Mouse

Chromosome 7 open reading frame 57 is an uncharacterized protein found in humans and several other homologs. It is encoded by the C7orf57 gene. This gene is found to be greatly expressed in the fallopian tubes, testes, lungs, hippocampus, hypothalamus, and caudate. There are three isoforms of the gene. Within the gene sequence 9 exons are present. C7orf57 has been linked to lupus, pancreatic cancer sporadic amyotrophic lateral sclerosis. and gastrointestinal toxicity

== Gene ==
There are three isoforms of C7orf57. Isoform 1 is the longest of the three with 2102 residues and 9 exons. The protein sequence is 295 base pairs. Its locus is 7p12.3. It is often found in nuclear and mitochondrial sub cellular locations.

C7orf57 has a promoter upstream of its transcription site as found in Genomatix. The promoter is 1125 base pairs long, located between 48024511-48025635. It codes for six transcripts of C7orf57.

== Protein ==
=== Post translation modifications ===
There are many phosphorylation sites found on the protein, mostly on serine and threonine. There are also many glycosylation sites.

=== Secondary structure ===
C7orf57 does not have a known secondary structure, though it is predicted to consist mainly of random coils with some alpha helixes. It is predicted to be similar in structure to Phosphoribosylanthranilate isomerase.

== Tissue expression ==
C7orf57 has increased expressed in the larynx, testis, fallopian tubes, lungs, and parts of the brain. It is expressed in lower amounts with pathology.

== Evolution ==
Orthologs have been found in mammals, ranging from primates to amphibians. There are also orthologs found in more distant species such as birds, reptiles, and fish with the most distant relative being a whale shark. There are two paralogs of the gene, for actin a and actin b. The gene has evolved at a steady pace when compared to a slow and a fast evolving gene.

Homologs
Species	Median Date of Divergence (MYA)	% Identity
Humans	0	100
Orangutan	15.2	96.27
Gibbon	19.4	95.59
Tarsier	66.7	84.53
Horse	94	77.29
Seal	94	71.48
Armadillo	102	71.48
Killdeer	320	58.16
Ostrich	320	56.5
Turkey	320	51.05
Green Anole	320	51
Burmese Python	320	50.9
Pit Viper	320	50
Japanese Gekko	320	47.22
Zebra Finch	320	46.96
Crow	320	41.38
Tibetan Frog	353	47.79
Tropical Clawed Frog	353	45.9
American Bullfrog	353	44.35
Elephant Shark	465	29.11

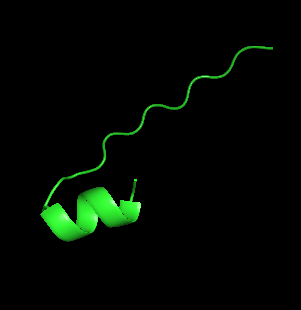
Secondary structure of C7orf57 made using Cn3d

== Clinical significance ==
C7orf57 has been linked to several diseases, including pancreatic cancer, sporadic amyotrophic lateral sclerosis (ALS), systematic lupus erythematous (SLE), and gastrointestinal toxicity. In a study that analyzed pancreatic cancer cells, it was found that when a patient was treated with metformin and aspirin, C7orf57 was unregulated by over 10 fold. Another disease of interest is gastrointestinal toxicity. A high correlation between C7orf57 and an increased risk of experiencing severe gastrointestinal toxicity was found with a r2 value of 1.0 For ALS, the gene was found to have a nonrandom association with one of the SNPs associated with the disease. However, genome-wide significance was not achieved. The gene is also linked to Lupus as to SNPs in its locus were found to be related to serum IFN-α activity, which is elevated in many lupus patients and therefore is thought to be a causing factor. Like in the ALS study, the locus failed to replicate.

C7orf57 was found to have lower expression than normal when studying individuals with endometriosis and nasopharyngeal carcinoma, a cancer of the head and neck
