= TIM barrel =

Protein fold

Aldolase-type TIM barrel
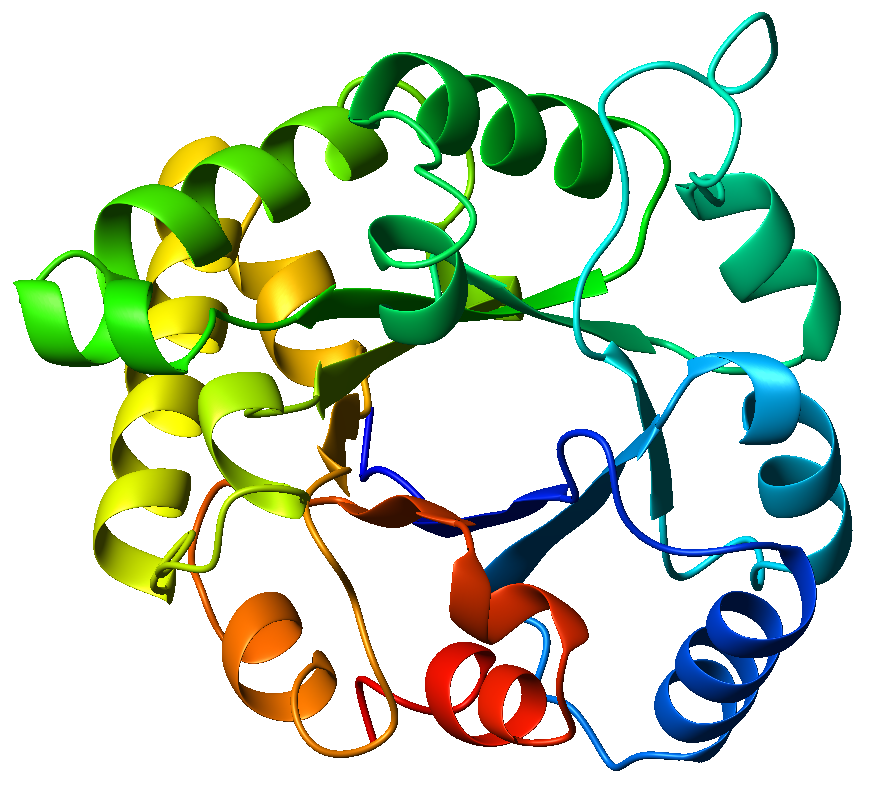
- Top view of a triosephosphateisomerase (TIM) barrel (PDB: 8TIM), colored from blue (N-terminus) to red (C-terminus).

Identifiers
- Symbol: Aldolase_TIM
- Pfam clan: CL0036
- ECOD: 2002.1.1
- InterPro: IPR013785
- CATH: 8tim
- SCOP2: 8tim / SCOPe / SUPFAM
Available protein structures:
- PDB: IPR013785
- AlphaFold: IPR013785

The TIM barrel (triose-phosphate isomerase), also known as an alpha/beta barrel, is a conserved protein fold consisting of eight alpha helices (α-helices) and eight parallel beta strands (β-strands) that alternate along the peptide backbone. The structure is named after triose-phosphate isomerase, a conserved metabolic enzyme. TIM barrels are ubiquitous, with approximately 10% of all enzymes adopting this fold. Further, five of seven enzyme commission (EC) enzyme classes include TIM barrel proteins. The TIM barrel fold is evolutionarily ancient, with many of its members possessing little similarity today, instead falling within the twilight zone of sequence similarity.

The inner beta barrel (β-barrel) is in many cases stabilized by intricate salt-bridge networks. Loops at the C-terminal ends of the β-barrel are responsible for catalytic activity while N-terminal end loops are important for the stability of the TIM-barrels. Structural inserts ranging from extended loops to independent protein domains may be inserted in place of these loops or at the N-terminus/C-terminals. TIM barrels appear to have evolved through gene duplication and domain fusion events of half-barrel proteins, with a majority of TIM barrels originating from a common ancestor. This led many TIM barrels to possess internal symmetries. Further gene duplication events of this ancestral TIM barrel led to diverging enzymes possessing the functional diversity observed today. TIM barrels have also been a longstanding target for protein designers. Successful TIM barrel designs include both domain fusions of existing proteins and de novo designs. Domain fusions experiments have resulted in many successful designs, whereas de novo designs only yielded successes after 28 years of incremental development.

== Structure ==
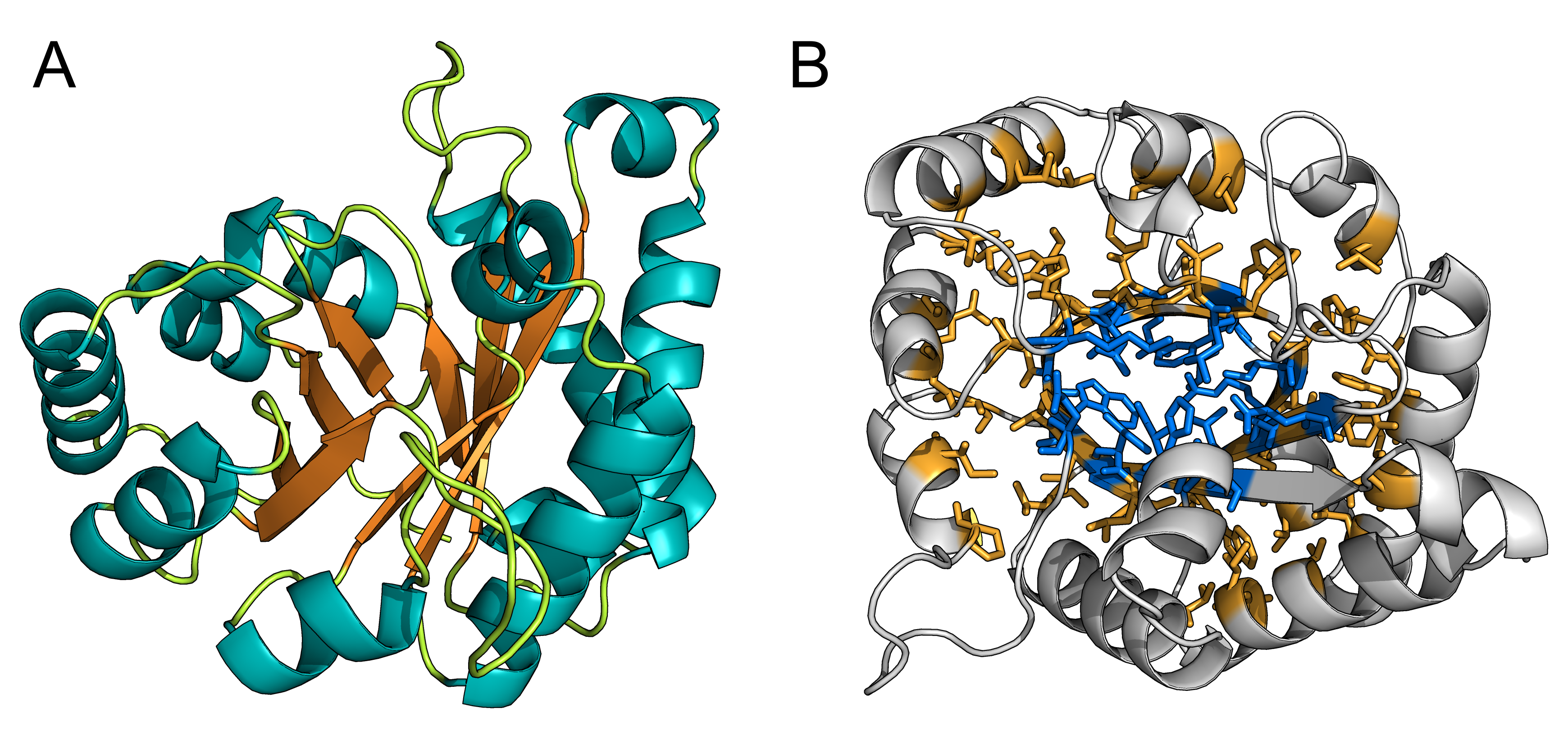
Triose-phosphate isomerase (TIM) isolated from chicken muscles (PDB: 1TIM), the archetypal TIM barrel enzyme. (A) Cartoon representation of the TIM barrel structure. α-helices are colored teal, β-strands are colored orange, and loops are colored green. Note that the C-terminal ends of β-strands are depicted with arrowheads. (B) Core and pore regions are highlighted. Amino acid residues belonging to the pore are colored blue. Amino acid residues belonging to the core are colored orange. Note that the TIM barrel is depicted in a top-down view, where the C-terminal ends of the β-barrel are pointed towards the reader.

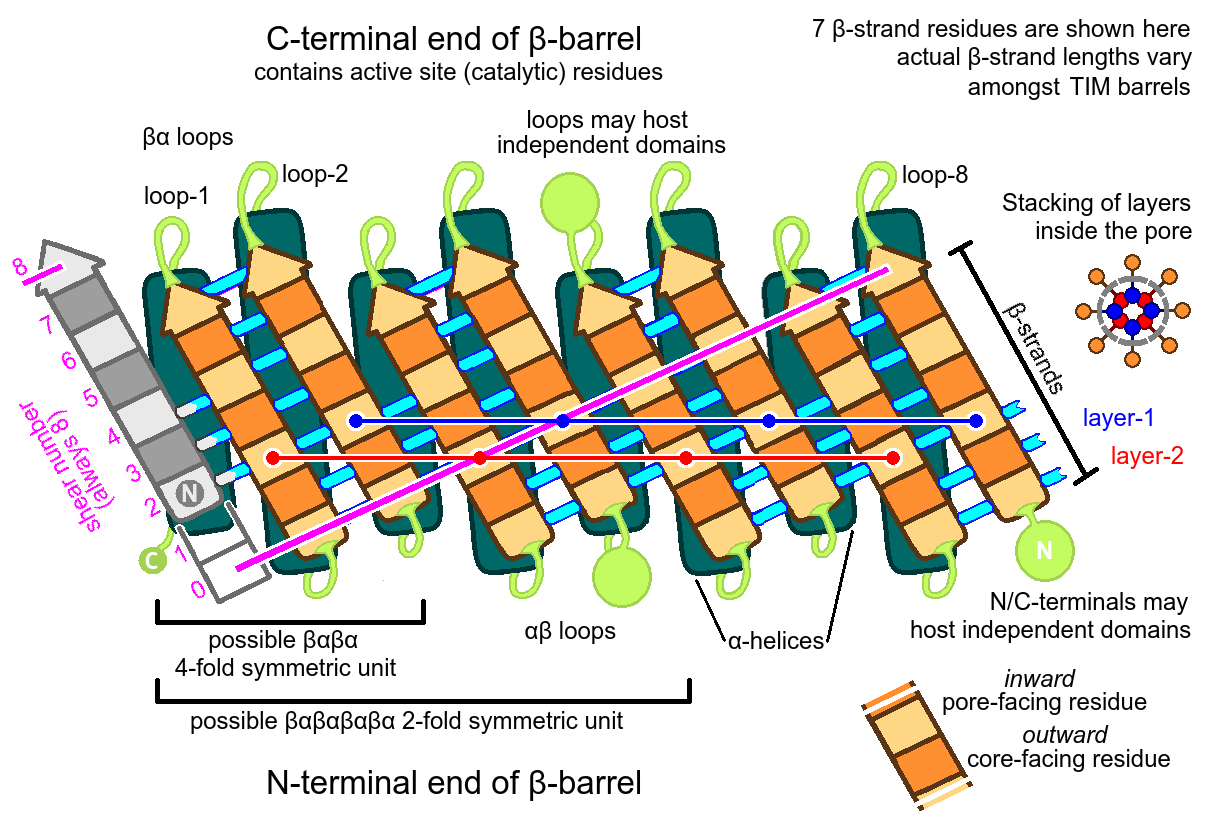
TIM barrel topology. α-helices are colored teal, loops are colored green, and β-strands are colored in two shades of orange. Lighter shades indicate residues pointing inward, towards the barrel pore. Darker shades indicate residues pointing outward, towards the barrel core. Cyan lines depict an example backbone β-barrel hydrogen bonding network. Note that side-chain hydrogen bonding networks are not depicted here. Interior β-barrel residues (pore residues) display a 4-fold geometric symmetry, despite emerging from an 8-strand β-barrel. This symmetry is illustrated as two example "layers" in red and blue. Each layer contains 4 residues that point towards the pore, and lie on the same plane perpendicular to the barrel axis. The shear number for TIM barrels is always 8, and is illustrated in magenta. Some TIM barrels naturally adopt, or are designed to adopt, two or four-fold symmetry. Example asymmetric units are also highlighted. This figure has been adapted with permission from previously published work.

=== Topology ===
The TIM barrel gets its name from the enzyme triose-phosphate isomerase (TIM), which was the first protein possessing the fold to be crystallized. TIM barrels contain 200-250 amino acid residues, folded into 8 alpha helices (α-helices) and 8 beta strand (β-strands). The β-strands are arranged into a parallel beta barrel (β-barrel), and are surrounded by the 8 α-helices. The defining property of TIM β-barrels is that they always possess a shear number of 8. The shear number is determined by picking a residue x on β-strand-1, and moving along the β-barrel, in a perpendicular direction to the direction of the strands, until residue y on the original β-strand-1 is reached. The number of residues between the start and end positions (|y−x|) is the shear number. Since the number of strands is equal to the shear number, side-chains point alternatively towards the pore and the core, giving a 4-fold symmetry. The α-helices surround and completely enclose the inner β-barrel. Short loops typically connect the α and β secondary structures, forming a (βα)_{8} repeat topology. In some cases, structures ranging from extended loops to independent domains may be inserted in place of these loops, or may be attached to the N/C-terminals. All TIM barrel enzymes possess catalytic sites at the C-terminal end of the β-barrel, and structural inserts present close to this end may aid in catalytic activity.

=== Core and pore regions ===
TIM barrels contain two distinct buried regions, where amino acid residues are completely enveloped by their neighbors and lack access to solvent. The term 'pore' is a misnomer, as no solvent channels exist within this region. The core region consists of all residues constituting the α-β interface, and lies exterior to the central β-barrel. The pore region consists of all interior β-barrel residues, which are surrounded and enclosed by the β-barrel backbone.

Due to the pleated nature of β-strands, alternate residues along a strand are almost evenly split between the pore (53%) and core (47%). For β-barrels, 95% of their core residues are buried. Only 11% of their core residues are polar, possessing an affinity for water, and possessing the ability to form hydrogen bonds or salt bridges. Similarly, 84% of β-strand pore residues are buried. However, 42% of their pore residues are polar. These residues form intricate salt bridge networks to compensate for their lack of solvent accessibility.

=== TIM barrel stabilizing elements ===
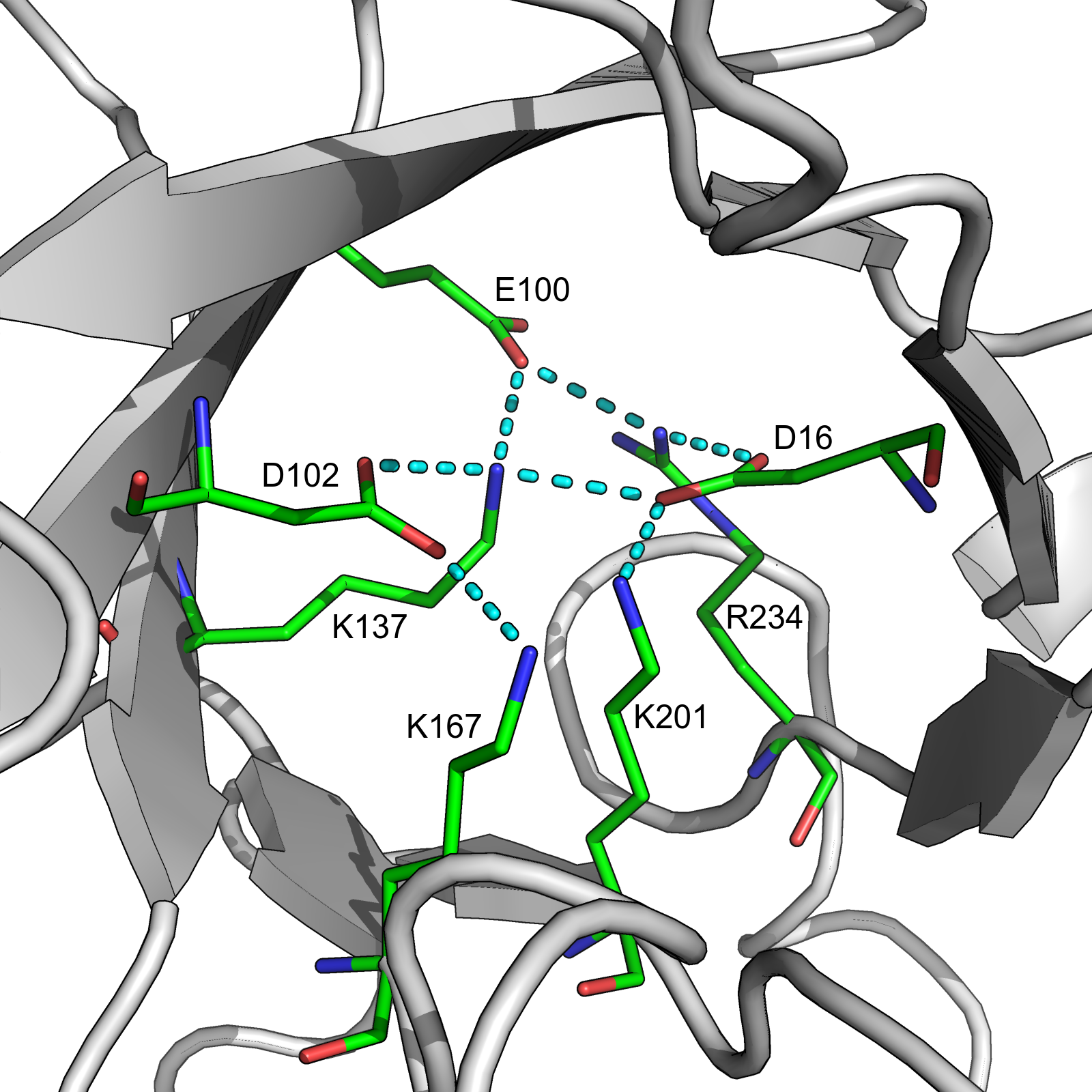
Example salt bridge network in 2-deoxyribose-5-phosphate aldolase (PDB: 1P1X). Interactions are shown as cyan dashed lines. Polar residues are colored green. Polar amino acids aspartate (D), glutamate (E), lysine (K), and arginine (R), are shown here.

Salt bridges within TIM barrel pores are thought to contribute to the overall stability of the fold. An example of a large salt bridge network can be found in 2-deoxyribose-5-phosphate aldolase. This network was found to be conserved across the Class I aldolase family.

The exact reason for the overrepresentation of polar residues and salt bridges within the pore remains unclear. One study proposes that they improve foldability rather than thermodynamic stability of TIM barrels. During the folding process, inner pore residues on β-strands would be exposed to water. Partially-folded βαβα modules, called foldons, would be energetically stabilized by polar pore residues during this stage of folding.

In another study involving the S. solfataricus indole-3-glycerol phosphate synthase TIM barrel protein, a conserved βαβαβ module was found to be an essential folding template, which guided the folding of other secondary structures. β-barrel closure only occurred at the end of the folding process. In this case however, the authors credited branched aliphatic amino acids (valine, leucine, and isoleucine) for foldon stability.

Another stabilizing element in TIM barrels is the beta hairpin clamp. Side chain H-bond donors at the N-termini of even-numbered β-strands often form H-bonds with main chain amide hydrogens in preceding odd-numbered β-strands. These clamps (or hydrophobic side chain bridge analogs) are conserved in 3 indole-3-glycerolphosphate synthase TIM barrel orthologs from the bacterial and archaeal kingdoms, implying they arose in their last common ancestor and have been preserved for over a billion years.

=== Structural inserts ===
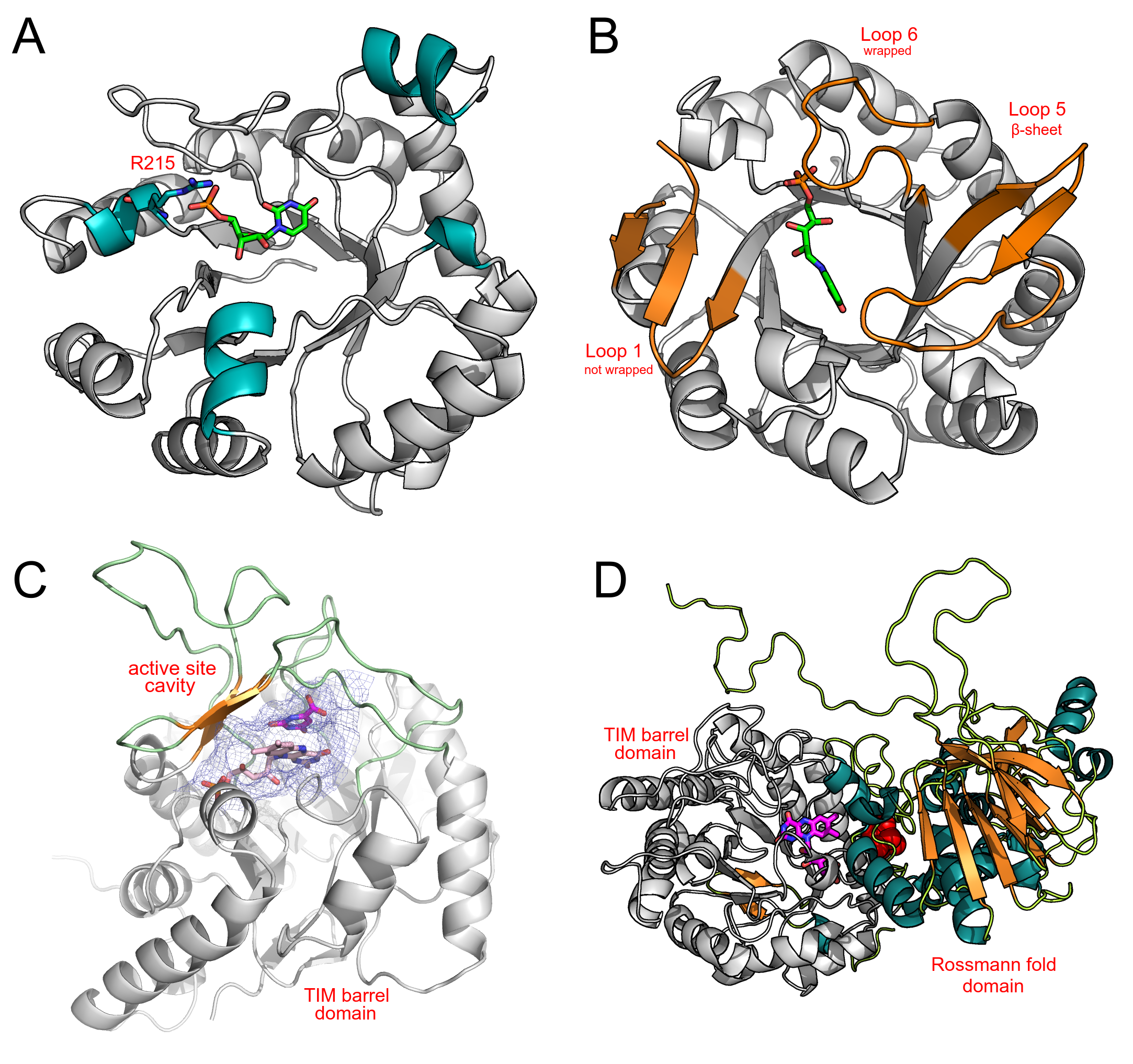
Examples of structural inserts at TIM barrel loop and N/C-terminal regions. (A) The Bacillus subtilis orotidine 5′-monophosphate decarboxylase (PDB: 1DBT). Orotidine 5'-monophosphate is colored green. α-helical inserts are colored teal. The catalytic arginine residue (R215) is displayed as sticks. (B) Mycobacterium tuberculosis bifunctional histidine/tryptophan biosynthesis isomerase (PriA) (PDB: 2Y85). CdRP, the product of the TrpF reaction, is colored green. β-strand/loop interchangeable structures are colored orange. (C) Lactococcus lactis dihydroorotate dehydrogenase A (DHODA) (PDB: 2DOR). β-strands forming a sheet are colored orange. Extended loops are colored green. The cavity formed by these structures is displayed as a blue mesh. The product orotate is colored magenta. the cofactor FMN is colored pink. (D) Methylophilus methylotrophus trimethylamine dehydrogenase (PDB: 2TMD). The Rossmann fold domain is colored according to secondary structural elements. Cofactor FMN is colored magenta. The [4Fe-4S]^{+} is colored red. Note that substrate/product were not crystallized.

The N/C-terminal and loop regions on TIM barrel proteins are capable of hosting structural inserts ranging from simple secondary structural motifs to complete domains. These domains aid in substrate recognition and catalytic activity. Four diverse examples of TIM barrels containing additional motifs and domains are discussed below.

Bacillus subtilis orotidine 5'-phosphate decarboxylase (PDB: 1DBT) is a TIM barrel protein displaying 4 α-helices in place of the βα loops typically present at the C-terminal of the β-barrel (residues 35-42, 89-91, 126-133, and 215-219). One of these helices (R215→K219) contains a conserved arginine residue (R215) required for interacting with a phosphate moiety on orotidine 5′-monophosphate. The other helices were not found to host residues critical for catalytic activity, and may serve in structural roles.

Mycobacterium tuberculosis bifunctional histidine/tryptophan biosynthesis isomerase (PriA) (PDB: 2Y85) possesses the ability to catalyse two reactions: (i) HisA reaction: the conversion of N-[(5-phosphoribosyl) formimino]-5-aminoimidazole-4-carboxamide ribonucleotide (ProFAR) to N-[(5-phosphoribulosyl)formimino]-5-aminoimidazole-4-carboxamide ribonucleotide (PRFAR), and (ii) TrpF reaction: N-(5'-phosphoribosyl)-anthranilate (PRA) to 1-(O-carboxyphenylamino)- 1'-deoxyribulose-5'-phosphate (CdRP). PriA is a TIM barrel enzyme that accommodates both substrates using active site loops (loops 1, 5, and 6, extended βα loops at the C-terminal end of the β-barrel) that change conformation depending on the reactant present. Loop 1 wraps over the active site only in the presence of ProFAR. Loop5 wraps over the active site, adopting a β-sheet conformation in the presence of CdRP, or a knot-like conformation in the presence of ProFAR. Loop 6 wraps over the active site for all reactants.

Lactococcus lactis Dihydroorotate dehydrogenase A (DHODA) (PDB: 2DOR) is an example of a TIM barrel possessing β-sheets and extended loops over the C-terminal end of the β-barrel. DHODA catalyzes the oxidation of dihydroorotate to orotate, which is part of the de novo uridine 5'-monophosphate (UMP) synthesis pathway. This oxidation is mediated by flavin mononucleotide (FMN). Here, β-sheets and extended loops enclose the active site forming a cavity, while also hosting several catalytic residues.

The Methylophilus methylotrophus trimethylamine dehydrogenase (PDB: 2TMD) TIM barrel is an example of a complete domain insertion. Here, a Rossmann fold domain is inserted at the C-terminal end of the TIM-barrel. Trimethylamine dehydrogenase catalyzes the conversion of trimethylamine to formaldehyde. This reaction requires both a reduced 6-S-cysteinyl Flavin mononucleotide (FMN) cofactor and a reduced iron-sulphur ([4Fe-4S]^{+}) center. FMN is covalently bound within the C-terminal region of the β-barrel. The [4Fe-4S]^{+} center is too large to be accommodated within the TIM barrel, and is instead placed in close proximity, 7 Å away, at the interface between the TIM barrel and Rossmann fold domains.

=== Folding mechanisms ===
The conservation of the TIM barrel fold is mirrored by the conservation of its equilibrium and kinetic folding mechanisms in bacterial paralogs with phylogenetically distinct lineages. Chemical denaturation of several natural and 2 designed TIM barrel variants invariably involves a highly populated equilibrium intermediate. The kinetic intermediates that appear after dilution from highly denaturing solutions involve an early misfolded species that must at least partially unfold to access the productive folding pathway. The rate-limiting step in folding is the closure of the 8-stranded β-barrel, with the preceding, open barrel form corresponding to the equilibrium intermediate. Native-centric molecular dynamics simulations recapitulate the experimental results and point the way to testable computational models for complex folding mechanisms.

=== Conserved fitness landscapes ===
TIM barrel proteins possess an unusually high sequence plasticity, forming large families of orthologous and paralogous enzymes in widely divergent organisms. This plasticity suggests a sequence landscape that allows for protein adaptation to a variety of environmental conditions, largely independent of phylogenetic history, while maintaining function. A deep mutational scanning approach and a competition assay was used to determine the fitness of all possible amino acid mutants across positions in 3 hyperthermophilic indole-3-glycerolphosphate synthase (IGPS) TIM barrel enzymes in supporting the growth of a yeast host lacking IGPS. Although the 2 bacterial and 1 archaeal IGPS enzymes were only 30-40% identical in sequence, their fitness landscapes were strongly correlated: the same amino acids at the same positions in the three different proteins had very similar fitness. The correlation can be thought of as the conservation of the fitness landscape for a TIM barrel enzyme across evolutionary time.

=== Loop regions ===
Of the approximately 200 residues required to fully form a TIM barrel, about 160 are considered structurally equivalent between different proteins sharing this fold. The remaining residues are located on the loop regions that link the helices and strands; the loops at the C-terminal end of the strands tend to contain the active site, which is one reason this fold is so common: the residues required to maintain the structure and the residues that effect enzymatic catalysis are for the most part distinct subsets: The linking loops can, in fact, be so long that they contain other protein domains. Recently, it has been demonstrated that catalytic loops can be exchanged between different TIM barrel enzymes as semiautonomous units of functional groups.

== Evolution and origins ==
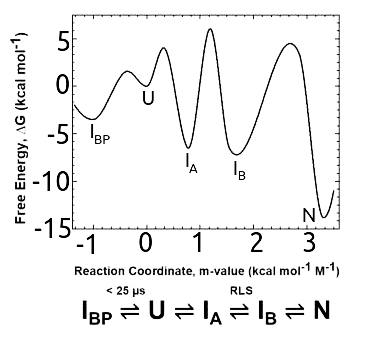
The reaction coordinate diagram for SsIGPS at pH 7.8 and 25°C. The refolding reaction begins in the unfolded, U state, initially misfolds to the I_{BP} intermediate state, partially unfolds to reach the I_{A} intermediate state whose conversion to the subsequent I_{B} intermediate state is rate-limiting. The final step is the conversion of I_{B} to the native state, N. The I_{A} and I_{B} kinetic intermediates correspond to the intermediate observed in equilibrium unfolding studies. The ordinate represents the free energy of each state in the folding reaction mechanism in kcal mol ^{−1}. The abscissa represents the dependence of the difference in free energy between 2 states on the denaturant concentration and is proportional to the change in buried surface, referenced to the U state. The kinetic folding mechanism, illustrating the flow of the unfolded protein to the native conformation is shown beneath the reaction coordinate diagram.

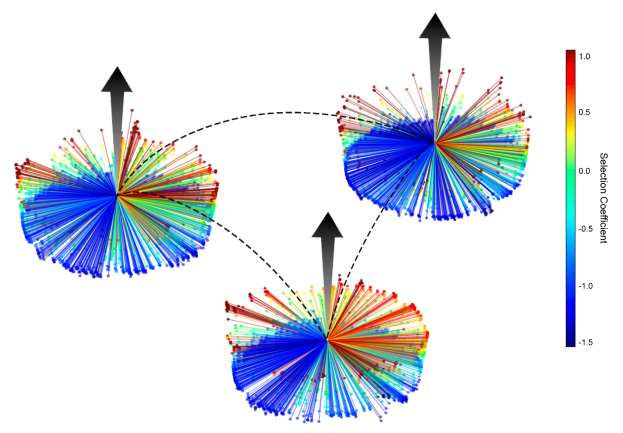
Experimentally derived fitness landscapes mapped from point mutations represent single steps from WT sequence. Despite significant divergence of WT in sequence space, the fitness landscapes of IGPS orthologues remain correlated (dashed lines). Rather than traditional two-dimensional heatmaps, fitness values are displayed on a three-dimensional pinwheel, highlighting the wide range of possible fitness effects of a single sequence step. The profiles of the pinwheels are similar, indicating the correlation of fitness landscapes, even if WT sequences (centers of the wheels) are only 40% identical and widely separated. Principal component analysis demonstrates a correlation between experimental fitness landscapes and amino-acid preferences in evolved sequences.

The predominant theory for TIM barrel evolution involves gene duplication and fusion, starting with a half- barrel that eventually formed a full TIM barrel. Multiple studies support the theory of divergent evolution from a single ancestor, and are discussed below.

=== Evolution from a common ancestor ===
In the early 1990s, it was noted that all TIM barrel structures solved at the time were enzymes, indicating divergence from a common ancestor. Further, all TIM barrels possessed active sites at the C-terminal end of β-barrels. suggested that A common phosphate binding site, formed by a small α-helix and TIM barrel loops-7/8, strongly indicated divergent evolution. Further studies of these phosphate groups, concluding that 12 of 23 SCOP TIM barrel families diverged from a common ancestor. Similarly there were hints for common ancestry for 17 of the 21 CATH TIM barrel families. Based on these reports, it is considered plausible that the majority of TIM barrel proteins evolved from a common ancestor.

=== Origin through gene duplication and domain fusion ===
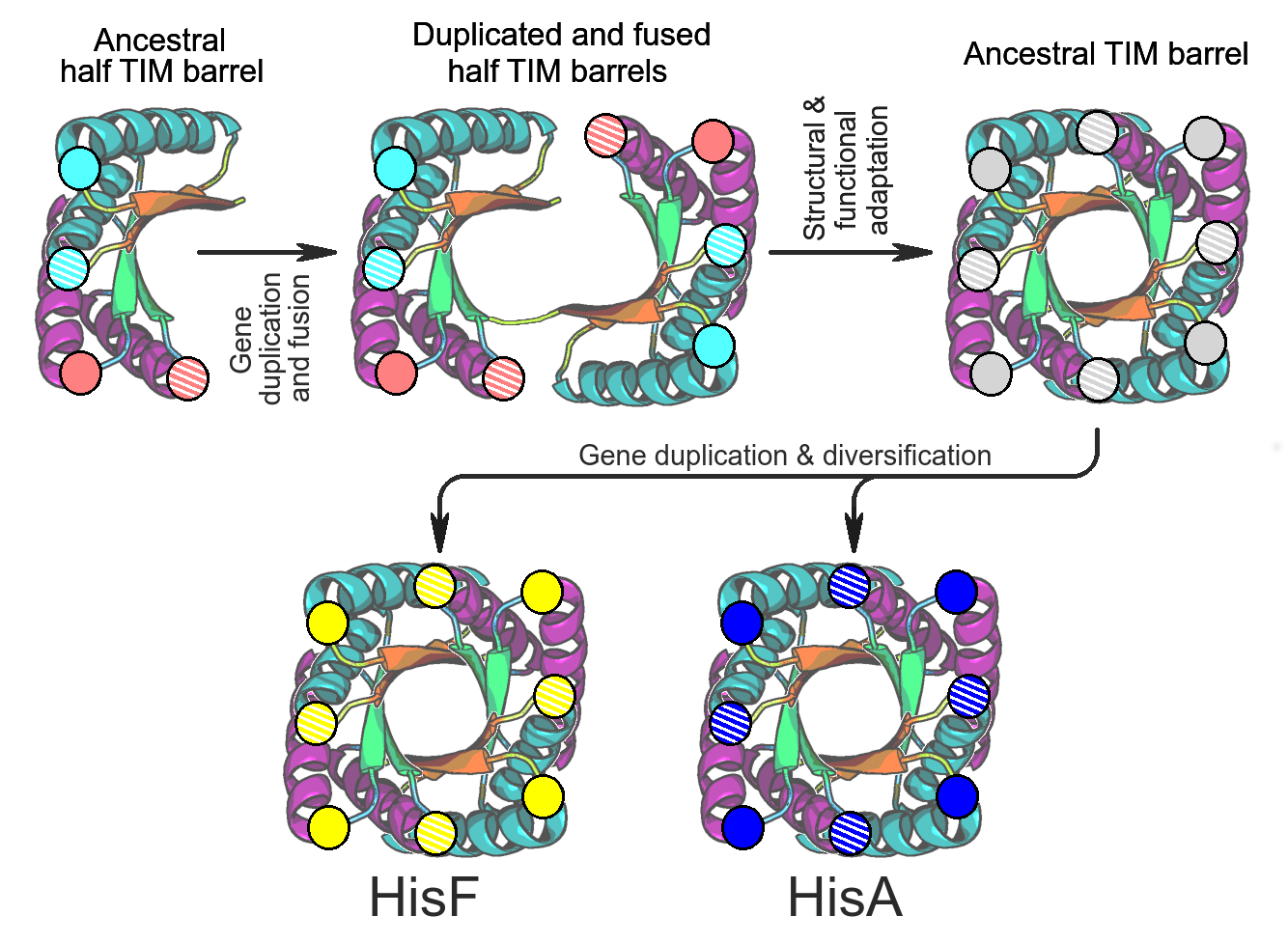
Model for the evolution of TIM barrels through gene duplication and domain fusion, as proposed by Lang et al. This model described the evolution of enzymes HisA and HisF of the histidine biosynthesis pathway. Two gene duplication steps are thought to have occurred. The first gene duplication resulted in two half-barrels that later fused and evolved into an ancestral TIM barrel. The second gene duplication event lead to diversification, and the evolution of different TIM barrel enzymes catalyzing different reactions.

Many TIM barrel proteins possess 2-fold, 4-fold or 8-fold internal symmetry, suggesting that TIM barrels evolved from ancestral (βα)_{4}, (βα)_{2}, or βα motifs through gene duplication and domain fusion. A good example of 2-fold internal symmetry is observed in the enzymes ProFAR isomerase (HisA) and imidazole glycerol phosphate synthase (HisF) of the Thermotoga maritima histidine biosynthesis pathway. They catalyze 2 successive reactions in the pathway, possess 25% sequence homology, and possess root-mean-square deviations (RMSDs) between 1.5-2 Å, suggesting divergence from a common ancestor. More interestingly, the loops on the C terminal ends of both HisA and HisF showed a twofold repeated pattern, suggesting that their common ancestor also possessed 2-fold internal symmetry. Using these observations, a model was constructed for the evolution of the TIM barrels. An ancestral half-barrel would have undergone a gene duplication and fusion event, resulting in a single protein containing two half-barrel domains. Structural adaptations would have occurred, resulting in the merging of these domains to form a closed β-barrel, and forming an ancestral TIM barrel. Functional adaptations would have also occurred, resulting in the evolution of new catalytic activity at the C terminal end of the β-barrel. At this point, the common ancestor of HisA and HisF would have undergone a second gene duplication event. Divergent evolution of the duplicated genes of the ancestral TIM barrel would have resulted in the formation of HisA and HisF.

Interestingly, this evolutionary model has been experimentally validated using rational protein design and directed evolution. Höcker et al. first fused two C-terminal halves of HisF, yielding HisF-CC. This construct was then stabilized by the insertion of an internal salt-bridge, yielding HisF-C*C. Further stepwise stabilization and solubilization of HisF-C*C was achieved by optimizing the half-barrel interface, generating HisF-C**C and HisF-C***C, respectively. The crystal structure of HisF-C***C revealed a 2-fold symmetric TIM barrel, validating the possibility of natural domain fusion. Moreover, Höcker created the first chimeric HisAF and HisFA TIM barrels using HisA and HisF half-barrels. These experiments led to the proposal of a novel means of diversification and evolution of TIM-barrel enzymes through the exchange of (βα)4 half-barrel domains amongst preexisting TIM barrels. In accordance with this idea, a high catalytic activity on the HisAF construct was established. Similarly, chimeric βα_{5}-flavodoxin-like fold (CheY)/HisF TIM barrels, and a perfectly 2-fold symmetric HisF-based TIM barrel have also been created.

The existence of 4/8-fold internal symmetry was suggested based on a computational analysis of TIM barrel sequences. For example, Escherichia coli KDPG aldolase (PDB: 1FQ0) was suggested to possess a distinct 4-fold symmetry, with discernible 8-fold symmetry. The design of a 4-fold symmetric TIM barrel confirmed the possibility of higher orders of internal symmetry in natural TIM barrels, and will be discussed in detail in the next section. No experimental evidence for the existence of 8-fold symmetric TIM barrels has been reported to date.

== De novo TIM barrel design ==
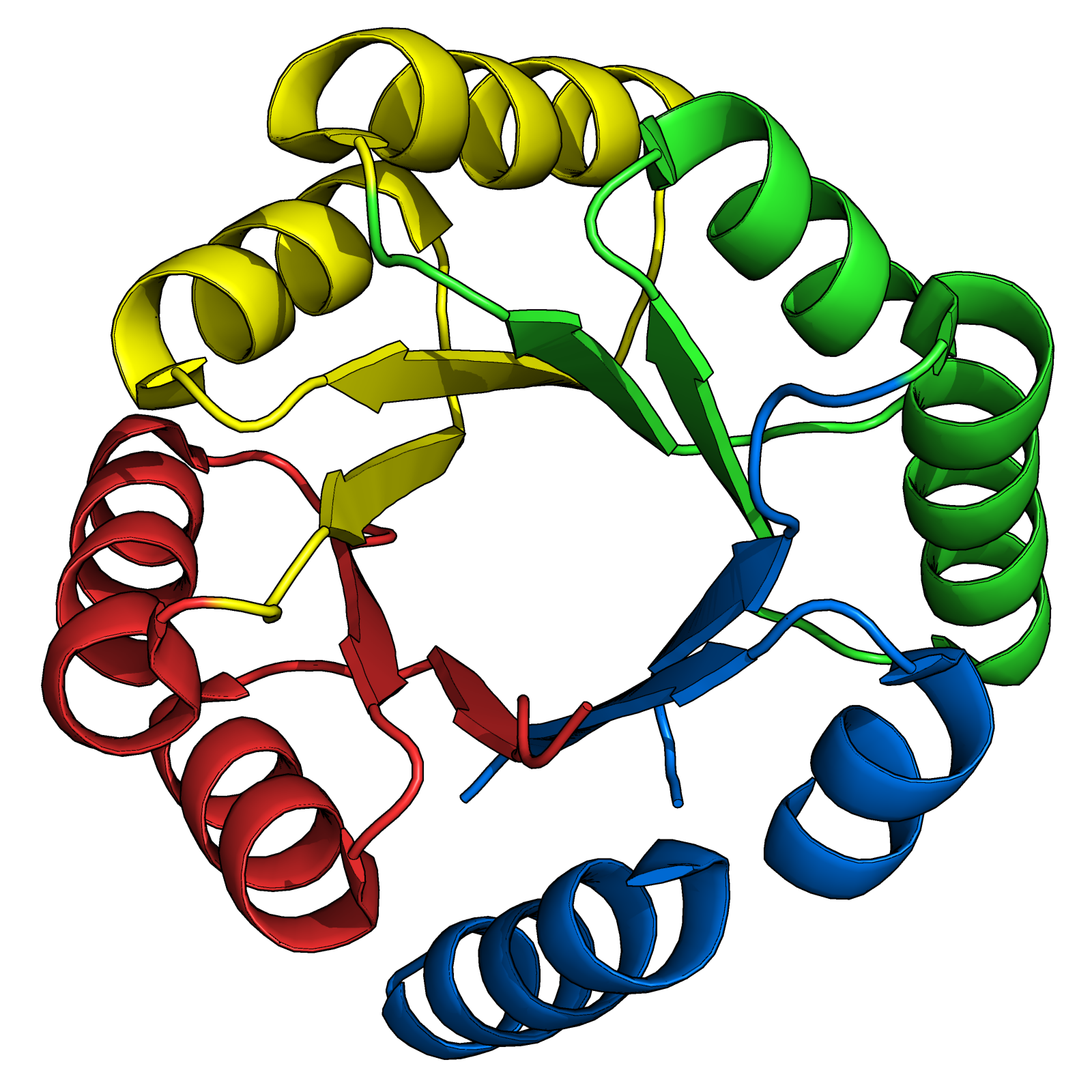
sTIM-11, the first successful de novo TIM barrel design. The asymmetric (αβ)_{2} units are colored distinctly, highlighting the internal 4-fold symmetry.

The TIM barrel fold has been a long-standing target for de novo protein designers. As previously described, numerous TIM barrels have been successfully designed based on preexisting natural half-barrels. In contrast, the de novo design of TIM barrels occurred in incremental steps over a period of 28 years.

The Octarellin series of proteins (Octarellin I→VI) were the first attempts to create a de novo TIM barrel. As the field of protein design was still in its infancy, these design attempts were only met with limited success. Although they displayed circular dichroism spectra consistent with αβ proteins and some cooperative folding characteristics, all Octarellin series peptides were insoluble, and had to be resolubilized from inclusion bodies for further characterization. Interestingly, Octarellin V.1 displayed a Rossmann-like fold under co-crystal conditions.

The Symmetrin series of proteins (Symmetrin-1→4) displayed more favorable biophysical characteristics. Symmetrin-1 was readily soluble, displayed circular dichroism spectra consistent with αβ proteins, and displayed excellent cooperative unfolding and refolding characteristics. Despite these advances, all proteins in this family displayed molten characteristics when analyzed using NMR (nuclear magnetic resonance), and further work to solve their structures could not be pursued.

Proteins of the sTIM series represented the first successful de novo TIM barrel design. sTIM-11 (PDB: 5BVL) was designed with an internal 4-fold symmetry, to reduce the complexity of computational design using the Rosetta software suite. Previously-derived first principles were used to delineate secondary structure topologies and lengths. sTIM-11 proved to be a highly thermostable, cooperatively folding design that adopted its intended structure.

== See also ==
- Protein folding
- Triosephosphate isomerase
