= MRI1 =

Protein-coding gene in the species Homo sapiens

Identifiers
- Aliases: MRI1, MRDI, MTNA, Ypr118w, MGC3207, methylthioribose-1-phosphate isomerase 1, M1Pi
- External IDs: OMIM: 615105; MGI: 1915123; GeneCards: MRI1
Available structures
PDB	Ortholog search: PDBe RCSB
PDB	List of PDB id codes 4LDQ, 4LDR
Enzyme activity
EC #	BRENDA	ExPASy	KEGG	MetaCyc
5.3.1.23	↗	↗	↗	↗

Gene location (Human)
Chr.	Chromosome 19 (human)
Band	19p13.13	Start	13,764,522 bp
Band	19p13.13	End	13,774,282 bp

Gene location (Mouse)
Chr.	Chromosome 8 (mouse)
Band	8|8 C2	Start	84,976,535 bp
Band	8|8 C2	End	84,983,955 bp
RNA expression pattern
Bgee	Human / Mouse (ortholog); Top expressed in: buccal mucosa cell; right uterine tube; canal of the cervix; sural nerve; body of uterus; ectocervix; left ovary; right ovary; skin of abdomen; right adrenal cortex / Top expressed in: right kidney; epithelium of small intestine; left lobe of liver; neural tube; endothelial cell of lymphatic vessel; embryo; proximal tubule; muscle of thigh; ventricular zone; adrenal gland; More reference expression data
BioGPS	n/a
Gene ontology
Molecular function	isomerase activity; identical protein binding; S-methyl-5-thioribose-1-phosphate isomerase activity
Cellular component	cell projection; nucleus; fibrillar center; nucleoplasm; cytosol; cytoplasm
Biological process	cellular biosynthetic process; methionine biosynthetic process; L-methionine salvage from methylthioadenosine; cell metabolism; cellular amino acid biosynthetic process; L-methionine salvage from S-adenosylmethionine
Sources:Amigo / QuickGO
Orthologs
Databases	NCBI: entry; OMA: entry
Species	Human	Mouse
Entrez	84245	67873
Ensembl	ENSG00000037757	ENSMUSG00000004996
UniProt	Q9BV20	Q9CQT1
RefSeq (mRNA)	NM_001031727; NM_032285; NM_001329572	NM_026423
RefSeq (protein)	NP_001026897; NP_001316501; NP_115661	NP_080699
Location (UCSC)	Chr 19: 13.76 – 13.77 Mb	Chr 8: 84.98 – 84.98 Mb
PubMed search
- Wikidata
View/Edit Human	View/Edit Mouse

Methylthioribose-1-phosphate isomerase is an enzyme that in humans is encoded by the MRI1 gene. As an enzyme, it acts as an S-methyl-5-thioribose-1-phosphate isomerase, and is involved in the methionine salvage pathway.
