= Trimethylamine dehydrogenase =

Identifiers
- EC no.: 1.5.8.2
- CAS no.: 39307-09-0

Databases
- IntEnz: IntEnz view
- BRENDA: BRENDA entry
- ExPASy: NiceZyme view
- KEGG: KEGG entry
- MetaCyc: metabolic pathway
- PRIAM: profile
- PDB structures: RCSB PDB PDBe PDBsum
- Gene Ontology: AmiGO / QuickGO
Search
- PMC: articles
- PubMed: articles
- NCBI: proteins

Trimethylamine dehydrogenase (EC 1.5.8.2) is an enzyme that catalyzes the chemical reaction

trimethylamine
+ electron-transferring
flavoprotein
H_{2}O
H_{2}O
dimethylamine
+
formaldehyde
+ reduced
flavoprotein

The three substrates of this enzyme are trimethylamine, water, and an electron-transferring flavoprotein. Its products are dimethylamine, formaldehyde, and the reduced flavoprotein.

This enzyme belongs to the family of oxidoreductases, specifically those acting on the CH-NH group of donors with a flavin as acceptor. The systematic name of this enzyme class is trimethylamine:electron-transferring flavoprotein oxidoreductase (demethylating). It uses one cofactor, flavin mononucleotide. A similar enzyme, dimethylamine dehydrogenase, converts dimethylamine to methylamine.
