= ZNF24 =

Protein-coding gene in the species Homo sapiens

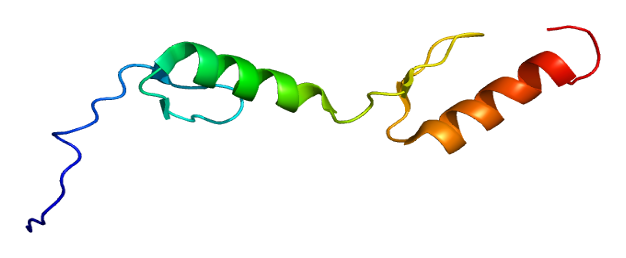

Identifiers
- Aliases: ZNF24, KOX17, RSG-A, ZNF191, ZSCAN3, Zfp191, zinc finger protein 24
- External IDs: OMIM: 194534; MGI: 1929704; GeneCards: ZNF24
Available structures
PDB	Ortholog search: PDBe RCSB
PDB	List of PDB id codes 1X6E, 3LHR

Gene location (Human)
Chr.	Chromosome 18 (human)
Band	18q12.2	Start	35,332,227 bp
Band	18q12.2	End	35,345,482 bp

Gene location (Mouse)
Chr.	Chromosome 18 (mouse)
Band	18|18 A2	Start	24,142,759 bp
Band	18|18 A2	End	24,153,867 bp
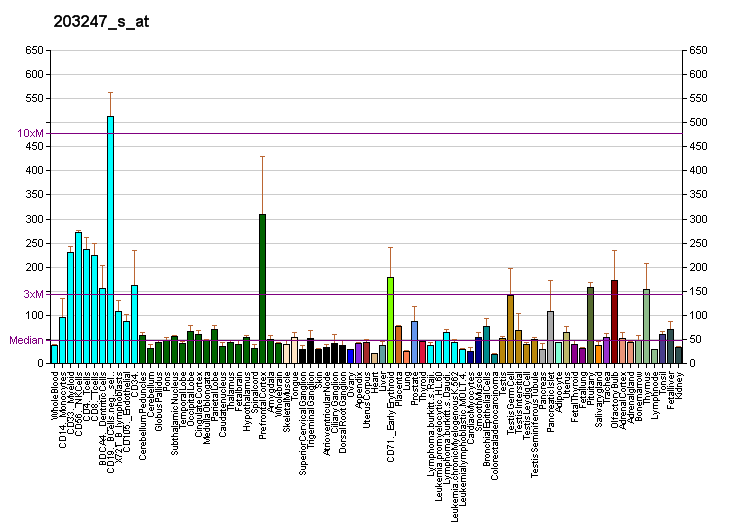

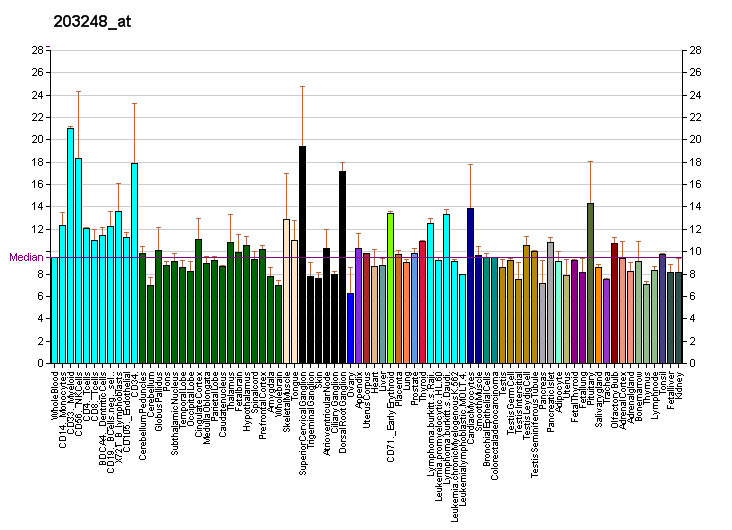
RNA expression pattern
Bgee	Human / Mouse (ortholog); Top expressed in: internal globus pallidus; corpus callosum; inferior ganglion of vagus nerve; olfactory bulb; pylorus; nipple; cardia; optic nerve; subthalamic nucleus; buccal mucosa cell / Top expressed in: medial ganglionic eminence; saccule; otic placode; ventricular zone; triceps brachii muscle; stria vascularis; vastus lateralis muscle; pituitary gland; otic vesicle; cumulus cell; More reference expression data
BioGPS	More reference expression data
Gene ontology
Molecular function	zinc ion binding; protein binding; metal ion binding; nucleic acid binding; DNA-binding transcription factor activity; DNA-binding transcription activator activity, RNA polymerase II-specific; sequence-specific DNA binding; DNA binding; DNA-binding transcription factor activity, RNA polymerase II-specific
Cellular component	nucleus
Biological process	myelination; negative regulation of transcription, DNA-templated; regulation of transcription, DNA-templated; transcription, DNA-templated; transcription by RNA polymerase II; positive regulation of transcription by RNA polymerase II
Sources:Amigo / QuickGO
Orthologs
Databases	NCBI: entry; OMA: entry
Species	Human	Mouse
Entrez	7572	59057
Ensembl	ENSG00000172466	ENSMUSG00000051469
UniProt	P17028	Q91VN1
RefSeq (mRNA)	NM_001308123; NM_006965; NM_001375815	NM_021559; NM_001357447; NM_001357448
RefSeq (protein)	NP_001295052; NP_008896; NP_001362744	NP_067534; NP_001344376; NP_001344377
Location (UCSC)	Chr 18: 35.33 – 35.35 Mb	Chr 18: 24.14 – 24.15 Mb
PubMed search
- Wikidata
View/Edit Human	View/Edit Mouse

Zinc finger protein 24 is a protein that in humans is encoded by the ZNF24 gene.
