= Deoxyribose-phosphate aldolase =

InterPro Family

deoxyribose-phosphate aldolase

Identifiers
- EC no.: 4.1.2.4
- CAS no.: 9026-97-5

Databases
- BRENDA: enzyme data
- ExPASy: NiceZyme view
- KEGG: enzyme entry
- MetaCyc: metabolic pathway
- Rhea: reactions
- PDB structures: RCSB PDB PDBe PDBsum
- Gene Ontology: AmiGO / QuickGO
Search
- PMC: articles
- PubMed: articles
- NCBI: proteins

The enzyme deoxyribose-phosphate aldolase (EC 4.1.2.4) catalyzes the reversible chemical reaction

2-deoxy-D-ribose 5-phosphate $\rightleftharpoons$ D-glyceraldehyde 3-phosphate + acetaldehyde

This enzyme belongs to the family of lyases, specifically the aldehyde-lyases, which cleave carbon-carbon bonds. The systematic name of this enzyme class is 2-deoxy-D-ribose-5-phosphate acetaldehyde-lyase (D-glyceraldehyde-3-phosphate-forming). Other names in common use include phosphodeoxyriboaldolase, deoxyriboaldolase, deoxyribose-5-phosphate aldolase, 2-deoxyribose-5-phosphate aldolase, and 2-deoxy-D-ribose-5-phosphate acetaldehyde-lyase.

== Enzyme Mechanism ==
Mechanism of DERA catalysis. First, substrate is shown, followed by stabilizing interactions at the active site. Finally, key lysine residues and the carbinolamine intermediate are shown. Based on PDB 1JCL

Amongst aldolases, DERA is one of the 2 only aldolases able to use two aldehydes as substrate (the other one being FSA). Crystallography shows that the enzyme is a Class I aldolase, so the mechanism proceeds via the formation of a Schiff base with Lys^{167} at the active site. A nearby residue, Lys^{201}, is critical to reaction by increasing the acidity of protonated Lys^{167}, so Schiff base formation can occur more readily.

As equilibrium of the reaction as written lies on the side of reactant, DERA can also used to catalyze the backward aldol reaction. The enzyme has been found to exhibit some promiscuity by accepting various carbonyl compounds as substrates: acetaldehyde can be replaced with other small aldehydes or acetone; and a variety of aldehydes can be used in place of D-glyceraldehyde 3-phosphate. However, due to the spatial arrangement of stabilizing interactions of the electrophilic aldehyde at the active site, the aldol reaction is stereospecific and gives the (S)-configuration at the reactive carbon. Molecular modeling of the active site showed a hydrophilic pocket formed by Thr^{170} and Lys^{172} to stabilize C2-hydroxy group of D-glyceraldehyde 3-phosphate, while the C2-hydrogen atom is stabilized in a hydrophobic pocket. When a racemic mixture of glyceraldehyde 3-phosphate is used as the substrate, only the D-isomer reacted.

== Enzyme Structure ==
The DERA monomer contains a TIM α/β barrel fold, consistent with other Class I aldolases. The structure of DERAs across many organisms: DERAs from Escherichia coli and Aeropyrum pernix shares 37.7% sequence identity with DERA from Thermus thermophilus HB8. The reaction mechanism is also conserved between DERAs.

In solution, DERAs are found in homodimers or homotetramers. The oligomeric nature of the enzyme does not contribute to enzymatic activity, but serves to increase thermal stability through hydrophobic interactions and hydrogen bonding between interfacial residues.

As of late 2007, 10 structures have been solved for this class of enzymes, with PDB accession codes PDB: 1JCJ, PDB: 1JCL, PDB: 1KTN, PDB: 1MZH, PDB: 1N7K, PDB: 1O0Y, PDB: 1P1X, PDB: 1UB3, PDB: 1VCV, and PDB: 2A4A.

== Biological Function ==
DERA is part of the inducible deo operon in bacteria which allows for the conversion of exogenous deoxyribonucleosides for energy generation. The products of DERA, glyceraldehyde-3-phosphate and acetaldehyde (subsequently converted to acetyl CoA) can enter the glycolysis and Kreb's cycle pathways respectively.

In humans, DERA is mainly expressed in lungs, liver and colon and is necessary for the cellular stress response. After induction of oxidative stress or mitochondrial stress, DERA colocalizes with stress granules and associates with YBX1, a known stress granule protein. Cells with high DERA expression were able to utilize exogenous deoxyinosine to produce ATP when starved of glucose and incubated with mitochondrial uncoupler FCCP.

== Industrial Relevance ==
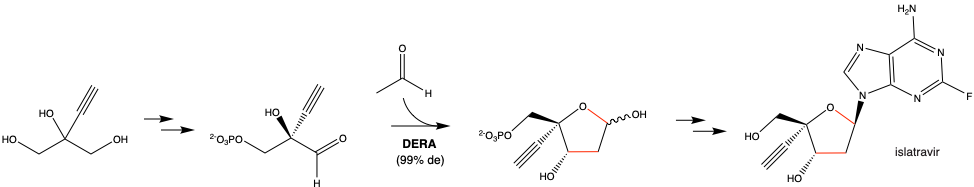
DERA used in islatravir biocatalysis. Bonds formed by DERA are highlighted in red.

DERA is being used in chemical syntheses as a tool for green, enantioselective aldol reactions. Formation of the deoxyribose skeleton from small molecules can facilitate the synthesis of nucleoside reverse transcriptase inhibitors. For example, DERA was used in a mixture of five enzymes in the biocatalytic synthesis of islatravir.

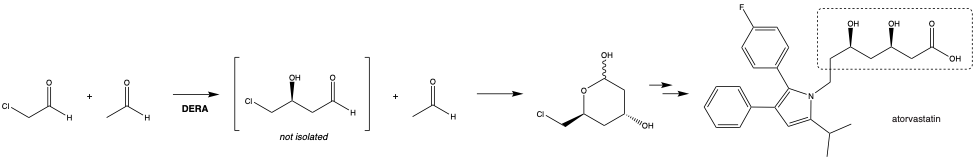
DERA used in Atorvastatin biocatalysis. The portion of Atorvastatin which was derived from the DERA catalyzed reaction is indicated.

DERA has also been used to perform tandem aldol reactions with three aldehyde substrates, with reaction equilibrium driven by the formation of the six-membered cyclic hemiacetal. This intermediate has been used in the synthesis of statin drugs, such as atorvastatin, rosuvastatin and mevastatin.

Natural DERAs show low tolerance to high concentrations of acetaldehyde due to the formation of the highly reactive crotonaldehyde intermediate that irreversibly inactivates the enzyme. This feature hampers the industrial applications of DERA as the concentration of acetaldehyde used will be limited. To overcome this, directed evolution has been used to improve the acetaldehyde tolerance of DERA to up to 400mM.
