= S-methyl-5-thioribose-1-phosphate isomerase =

Identifiers
- EC no.: 5.3.1.23
- CAS no.: 91608-95-6

Databases
- IntEnz: IntEnz view
- BRENDA: BRENDA entry
- ExPASy: NiceZyme view
- KEGG: KEGG entry
- MetaCyc: metabolic pathway
- PRIAM: profile
- PDB structures: RCSB PDB PDBe PDBsum
- Gene Ontology: AmiGO / QuickGO
Search
- PMC: articles
- PubMed: articles
- NCBI: proteins

In enzymology, a S-methyl-5-thioribose-1-phosphate isomerase (EC 5.3.1.23) is an enzyme that catalyzes the chemical reaction

S-methyl-5-thio-alpha-D-ribose 1-phosphate $\rightleftharpoons$ S-methyl-5-thio-D-ribulose 1-phosphate

Hence, this enzyme has one substrate, S-methyl-5-thio-alpha-D-ribose 1-phosphate, and one product, S-methyl-5-thio-D-ribulose 1-phosphate.

This enzyme belongs to the family of isomerases, specifically those intramolecular oxidoreductases interconverting aldoses and ketoses. The systematic name of this enzyme class is S-methyl-5-thio-alpha-D-ribose-1-phosphate aldose-ketose-isomerase. Other names in common use include methylthioribose 1-phosphate isomerase, 1-PMTR isomerase, 5-methylthio-5-deoxy-D-ribose-1-phosphate ketol-isomerase, S-methyl-5-thio-5-deoxy-D-ribose-1-phosphate ketol-isomerase, S-methyl-5-thio-5-deoxy-D-ribose-1-phosphate, aldose-ketose-isomerase, 1-phospho-5'-S-methylthioribose isomerase, and S-methyl-5-thio-D-ribose-1-phosphate aldose-ketose-isomerase. This enzyme participates in methionine metabolism.

== Structural studies ==
As of late 2007, two structures have been solved for this class of enzymes, with PDB accession codes 1T9K and 1W2W.
