= Dimethylamine dehydrogenase =

Identifiers
- EC no.: 1.5.8.1

Databases
- BRENDA: enzyme data
- ExPASy: NiceZyme view
- KEGG: enzyme entry
- MetaCyc: metabolic pathway
- Rhea: reactions
- PDB structures: RCSB PDB PDBe PDBsum
- Gene Ontology: AmiGO / QuickGO
Search
- PMC: articles
- PubMed: articles
- NCBI: proteins

Dimethylamine dehydrogenase (EC 1.5.8.1) is an enzyme that catalyzes the chemical reaction

dimethylamine
+ electron-transferring
flavoprotein
H_{2}O
H_{2}O
methylamine
+
formaldehyde
+ reduced
flavoprotein

The three substrates of this enzyme are dimethylamine, water, and an electron-transferring flavoprotein. Its products are methylamine, formaldehyde, and the reduced flavoprotein.

This enzyme belongs to the family of oxidoreductases, specifically those acting on the CH-NH group of donors with a flavin as acceptor. The systematic name of this enzyme class is dimethylamine:electron-transferring flavoprotein oxidoreductase. It uses one cofactor, flavin mononucleotide.
