= ESS2 =

Protein-coding gene in the species Homo sapiens

Identifiers
- Aliases: ESS2, DGCR13, DGS-H, DGS-I, DGSH, DGSI, ES2, Es2el, DGCR14, DiGeorge syndrome critical region gene 14, bis1, ESS-2, ess-2 splicing factor homolog
- External IDs: OMIM: 601755; MGI: 107854; GeneCards: ESS2

Gene location (Mouse)
Chr.	Chromosome 16 (mouse)
Band	16 A3|16 11.09 cM	Start	17,718,573 bp
Band	16 A3|16 11.09 cM	End	17,729,212 bp
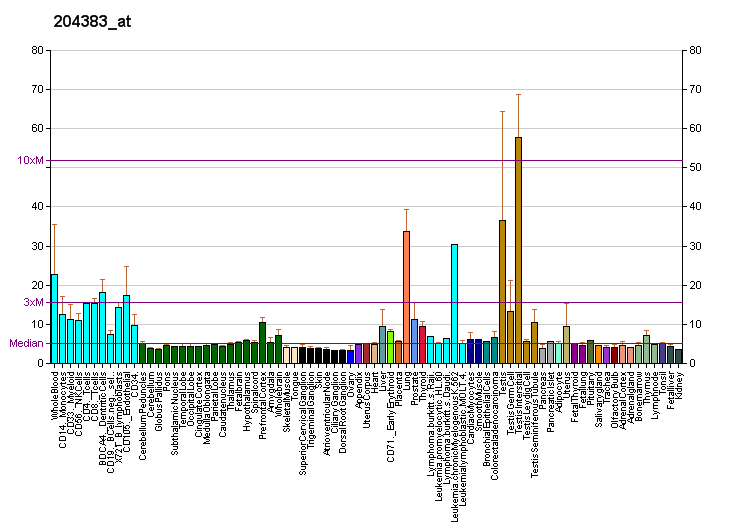

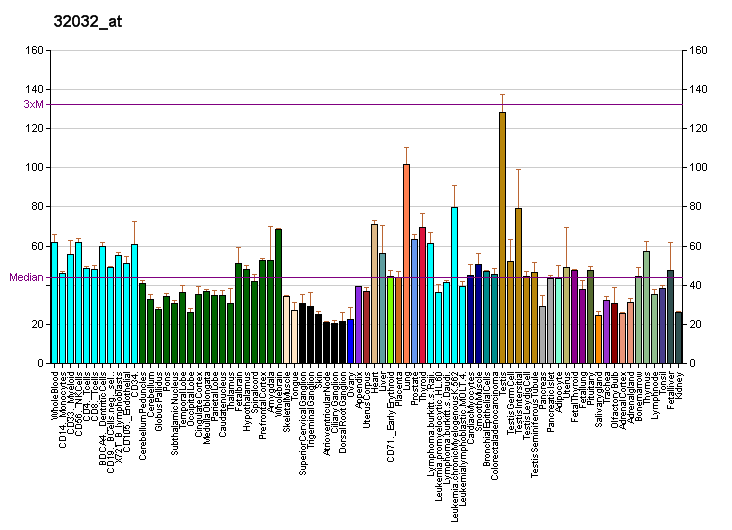

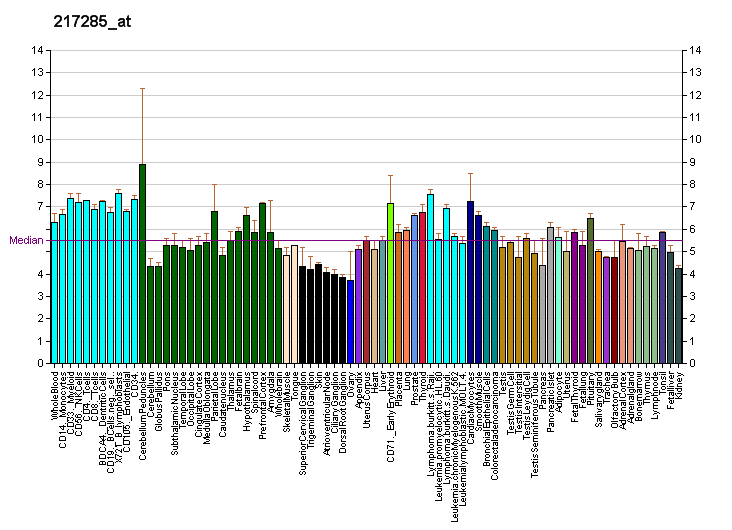
RNA expression pattern
Bgee	Human / Mouse (ortholog); Top expressed in: sperm; blood; skin of abdomen; popliteal artery; sural nerve; oocyte; prefrontal cortex; gastric mucosa; left uterine tube; thoracic aorta / Top expressed in: zygote; ventricular zone; granulocyte; tail of embryo; genital tubercle; neural tube; superior frontal gyrus; neural layer of retina; spermatid; secondary oocyte; More reference expression data
BioGPS	More reference expression data
Gene ontology
Molecular function	protein binding; molecular function
Cellular component	catalytic step 2 spliceosome; spliceosomal complex; nucleus
Biological process	mRNA splicing, via spliceosome; mRNA processing; RNA splicing; nervous system development
Sources:Amigo / QuickGO
Orthologs
Databases	NCBI: entry
Species	Human	Mouse
Entrez	8220	27886
Ensembl	n/a	ENSMUSG00000003527
UniProt	Q96DF8	O70279
RefSeq (mRNA)	NM_022719	NM_001081633; NM_022408
RefSeq (protein)	NP_073210	NP_001075102; NP_071853
Location (UCSC)	n/a	Chr 16: 17.72 – 17.73 Mb
PubMed search
- Wikidata
View/Edit Human	View/Edit Mouse

Splicing factor ESS-2 homolog is a protein that in humans is encoded by the ESS2 gene (previously DGCR13 or DGCR14). This protein may be involved in RNA splicing.

This gene is located within the minimal DGS critical region (MDGCR) thought to contain the gene(s) responsible for a group of developmental disorders. These disorders include DiGeorge syndrome, velocardiofacial syndrome, conotruncal anomaly face syndrome, and some familial or sporadic conotruncal cardiac defects which have been associated with microdeletion of 22q11.2. The encoded protein may be a component of C complex spliceosomes, and the orthologous protein in the mouse localizes to the nucleus.
