= Indole-3-glycerol-phosphate synthase =

Class of enzymes

indole-3-glycerol-phosphate synthase
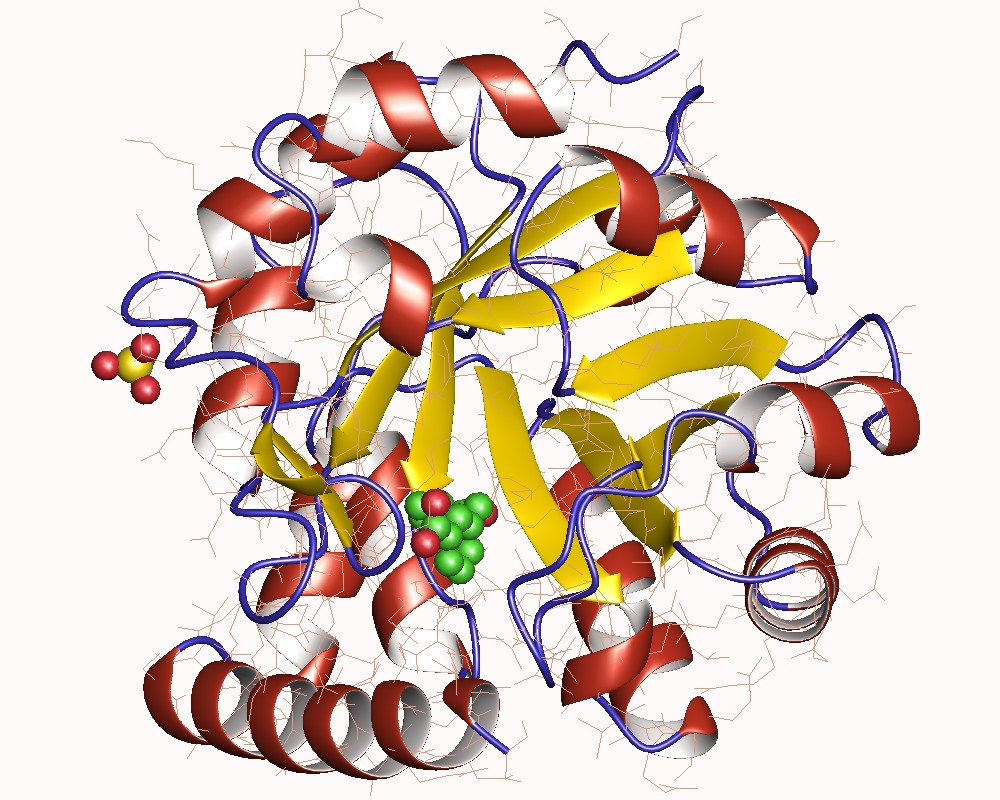
- Indole-3-glycerol-phosphate synthase monomer, Mycobacterium tuberculosis

Identifiers
- EC no.: 4.1.1.48
- CAS no.: 9031-60-1

Databases
- BRENDA: enzyme data
- ExPASy: NiceZyme view
- KEGG: enzyme entry
- MetaCyc: metabolic pathway
- Rhea: reactions
- PDB structures: RCSB PDB PDBe PDBsum
- Gene Ontology: AmiGO / QuickGO
Search
- PMC: articles
- PubMed: articles
- NCBI: proteins

Indole-3-glycerol phosphate synthase
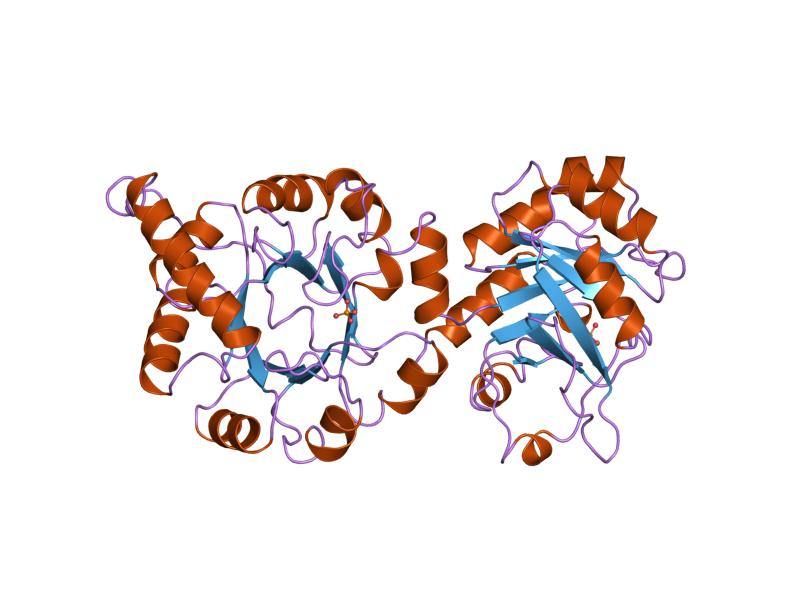
- three-dimensional structure of the bifunctional enzyme phosphoribosylanthranilate isomerase: indoleglycerolphosphate synthase from escherichia coli refined at 2.0 angstroms resolution

Identifiers
- Symbol: IGPS
- Pfam: PF00218
- Pfam clan: CL0036
- InterPro: IPR013798
- PROSITE: PDOC00536
- SCOP2: 1pii / SCOPe / SUPFAM
Available protein structures:
- PDB: IPR013798 PF00218 (ECOD; PDBsum)
- AlphaFold: IPR013798; PF00218

Indole-3-glycerol-phosphate synthase (IGPS) (EC 4.1.1.48) is an enzyme characterised from Escherichia coli that catalyzes the biosynthesis of indole-3-glycerol phosphate from 1-(2-carboxyphenylamino)-1-deoxy-D-ribulose 5-phosphate, with loss of carbon dioxide and water:

1-(2-carboxyphenylamino)-1-deoxy-D-ribulose 5-phosphate
CO_{2} + H_{2}O
indole-3-glycerol phosphate

The reaction is part of the pathway to the amino-acid tryptophan, and to auxin in plants. It has been of interest as a means of industrial production of such derivatives.

This enzyme is a lyase, specifically, a carboxy-lyase, which cleave carbon-carbon bonds. The systematic name of this enzyme class is 1-(2-carboxyphenylamino)-1-deoxy-D-ribulose-5-phosphate carboxy-lyase [cyclizing 1-C-(indol-3-yl)glycerol-3-phosphate-forming]. Other names in use include indoleglycerol phosphate synthetase, indoleglycerol phosphate synthase, indole-3-glycerophosphate synthase, 1-(2-carboxyphenylamino)-1-deoxy-D-ribulose-5-phosphate, and carboxy-lyase (cyclizing).

== Structural studies ==
In some bacteria, IGPS is a single chain enzyme. In others, such as Escherichia coli, it is the N-terminal domain of a bifunctional enzyme that also catalyses N-(5'-phosphoribosyl)anthranilate isomerase (EC 5.3.1.24) (PRAI) activity, the third step of tryptophan biosynthesis. In fungi, IGPS is the central domain of a trifunctional enzyme that contains a PRAI C-terminal domain and a glutamine amidotransferase (EC 2.4.2.-) (GATase) N-terminal domain.

A structure of the IGPS domain of the bifunctional enzyme from the mesophilic bacterium E. coli (eIGPS) has been compared with the monomeric indole-3-glycerol phosphate synthase from the hyperthermophilic archaeon Sulfolobus solfataricus (sIGPS). Both are single-domain (beta/alpha)8 barrel proteins, with one (eIGPS) or two (sIGPS) additional helices inserted before the first beta strand.

As of late 2007, 11 structures have been solved for this class of enzymes, with PDB accession codes PDB: 1A53, PDB: 1I4N, PDB: 1J5T, PDB: 1JCM, PDB: 1JUK, PDB: 1JUL, PDB: 1LBF, PDB: 1LBL, PDB: 1PII, PDB: 1VC4, and PDB: 2C3Z.
