= Alessio Fasano =

Medical doctor and researcher on celiac disease

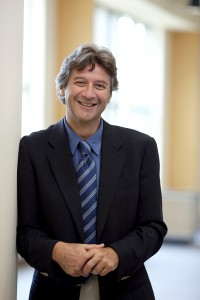
Fasano Alessio

Alessio Fasano is an Italian-born physician, scientist and academic recognized for his contributions to pediatric gastroenterology, mucosal immunology, and the study of celiac disease. He is a professor of Pediatrics at Harvard Medical School and a professor of Nutrition at Harvard T.H. Chan School of Public Health, both in Boston, Massachusetts. Fasano is director of the Mucosal Immunology and Biology Research Center (MIBRC) at Massachusetts General Hospital (MGH) and scientific director of the European Biomedical Institute of Salerno in Salerno, Italy. At Mead Johnson Nutrition in Evansville, Indiana, Fasano is Chief Science and Medical Officer and Senior Vice President of Research and Development.

== Education ==
Fasano was born and educated in Italy. He graduated summa cum laude from the University of Naples School of Medicine, where he completed training in medicine, surgery, pediatrics, emergency medicine and pediatric social medicine. In 1993, he joined the faculty of the University of Maryland School of Medicine in the United States, where he established a career in pediatric gastroenterology and biomedical research.

== Career ==
At the University of Maryland, he founded the Center for Celiac Research in 1996, helping to transform the understanding of celiac disease in North America. In 2013 the center moved to Massachusetts General Hospital, where he continued as its director until 2025. He also became chief of Pediatric Gastroenterology and Nutrition and director of the MIBRC at MGH in 2013.

Fasano's research spans translational medicine, autoimmune diseases, host-microbe interactions, and the role of the intestinal barrier in human health and disease. He has maintained an active clinical practice while leading multidisciplinary research programs focused on gastrointestinal disorders and immune-mediated diseases.

== Scientific Contributions ==
Fasano is known for several major scientific discoveries.

=== Celiac Disease Epidemiology ===
In 2003, Fasano led a landmark study demonstrating that celiac disease affects approximately 1 percent of the U.S. population and is substantially more common than previously believed. The finding helped reshape clinical guidelines and public awareness regarding the disease.

=== Discovery of Zonulin ===
While investigating mechanisms of infectious cholera diarrhea and developing vaccine strategies against enteric pathogens, Fasano's research team identified zonulin, a protein that regulates the permeability of intestinal tight junctions. This discovery provided important insights into how the intestinal barrier functions and how its dysregulation may contribute to autoimmune and inflammatory diseases.

=== Autoimmunity and the Gut Barrier ===
Fasano's work advanced the concept that impaired intestinal barrier function may play a role in the development of a variety of chronic inflammatory conditions such as celiac disease, metabolic disorders, neurodevelopmental and neurodgenerative disorders, autoimmune diseases, and other immune-mediated disorders.

== Publications and Recognition ==
Fasano has authored hundreds of peer-reviewed scientific publications and is listed among the most-cited researchers in the world in the fields of gastroenterology, celiac disease, and mucosal immunology. He has received numerous scientific honors, including election to the American Society for Clinical Investigation and the Harry Shwachman Award from the North American Society for Pediatric Gastroenterology, Hepatology and Nutrition.

He is also a frequent contributor to public discussions on nutrition, autoimmune diseases, and the microbiome and has appeared in major media outlets including The New York Times, The Wall Street Journal, CNN, NPR and the BBC.

== Selected Areas of Research ==
- Celiac disease and gluten-related disorders
- Intestinal permeability and zonulin biology
- Mucosal immunology
- Autoimmune diseases
- Microbiome-host interactions
- Pediatric gastroenterology
- Translational medicine

== Impact ==
Fasano is viewed as one of the leading figures in modern celiac disease research. His discoveries concerning the prevalence of celiac disease and the role of zonulin in regulating intestinal permeability have influenced both clinical practice and basic biomedical research, helping to shape the current understanding of the relationship between the gut barrier, immunity, and chronic inflammatory disease.

== Book publications ==
- Fast Facts. Celiac Disease. By Fasano A, Holmes G, Catassi C. Oxford: Health Press, 2009.
- Gluten Freedom. By Fasano A, Flaherty S. Wiley, 2014.
- Senza glutine. La celiachia non si cura, si gestisce (in Italian). By Fasano A. Mondadori, 2017.
- Se libérer du gluten: Le guide référence de la sensibilité au gluten et de la maladie coeliaque (Essai-Santé) (French Edition). By Fasano A. Marabout, 2017.
- A Clinical Guide to Gluten-Related Disorders Paperback. By Fasano A. LWW, 2013.
- Frontiers in Celiac Disease. By Fasano A, Troncone R, Branski D, eds. S. Karger Publishers, 2008.
- From Ptolemaus to Copernicus: The Evolving System of Gluten-Related Disorder. By Catassi C, Fasano A. Mdpi AG, 2018.
- Dieta Sem Glúten - Um Guia Essencial Para Uma Vida Saudável (in Portuguese). By Fasano A, Flaherty S, Rocha B. Madras, 2015.
- Gut Feelings: The Microbiome and Our Health. By Fasano A, Flaherty S. MIT Press, 2021.

== Cited publications ==
Fasano has authored (or co-authored) over 300 peer-reviewed publications. Some high-impact publications include:

- Fasano, Alessio; Not, Tarcisio; Wang, Wenle; Uzzau, Sergio; Berti, Irene; Tommasini, Alberto; Goldblum, Simeon E (April 2000). "Zonulin, a newly discovered modulator of intestinal permeability, and its expression in coeliac disease". The Lancet. 355 (9214): 1518–1519. doi:10.1016/S0140-6736(00)02169-3. PMID 10801176. S2CID 30315130.
- Fasano, Alessio; Catassi, Carlo (February 2001). "Current approaches to diagnosis and treatment of celiac disease: An evolving spectrum". Gastroenterology. 120 (3): 636–651. doi:10.1053/gast.2001.22123. PMID 11179241.
- Fasano, Alessio; Berti, Irene; Gerarduzzi, Tania; Not, Tarcisio; Colletti, Richard B.; Drago, Sandro; Elitsur, Yoram; Green, Peter H. R.; Guandalini, Stefano; Hill, Ivor D.; Pietzak, Michelle; Ventura, Alessandro; Thorpe, Mary; Kryszak, Debbie; Fornaroli, Fabiola; Wasserman, Steven S.; Murray, Joseph A.; Horvath, Karoly (10 February 2003). "Prevalence of Celiac Disease in At-Risk and Not-At-Risk Groups in the United States". Archives of Internal Medicine. 163 (3): 286–292. doi:10.1001/archinte.163.3.286. PMID 12578508.
- Hill, Ivor D.; Dirks, Martha H.; Liptak, Gregory S.; Colletti, Richard B.; Fasano, Alessio; Guandalini, Stefano; Hoffenberg, Edward J.; Horvath, Karoly; Murray, Joseph A.; Pivor, Mitchell; Seidman, Ernest G. (January 2005). "Guideline for the Diagnosis and Treatment of Celiac Disease in Children: Recommendations of the North American Society for Pediatric Gastroenterology, Hepatology and Nutrition". Journal of Pediatric Gastroenterology and Nutrition. 40 (1): 1–19. doi:10.1097/00005176-200501000-00001. PMID 15625418. S2CID 14805217.
- Drago, Sandro; El Asmar, Ramzi; Di Pierro, Mariarosaria; Grazia Clemente, Maria; Sapone, Amit Tripathi Anna; Thakar, Manjusha; Iacono, Giuseppe; Carroccio, Antonio; D'Agate, Cinzia; Not, Tarcisio; Zampini, Lucia; Catassi, Carlo; Fasano, Alessio; Fasano, A (26 August 2009). "Gliadin, zonulin and gut permeability: Effects on celiac and non-celiac intestinal mucosa and intestinal cell lines". Scandinavian Journal of Gastroenterology. 41 (4): 408–419. doi:10.1080/00365520500235334. hdl:10447/25450. PMID 16635908. S2CID 12348910.
- Catassi, Carlo; Fabiani, Elisabetta; Iacono, Giuseppe; D'Agate, Cinzia; Francavilla, Ruggiero; Biagi, Federico; Volta, Umberto; Accomando, Salvatore; Picarelli, Antonio; De Vitis, Italo; Pianelli, Giovanna; Gesuita, Rosaria; Carle, Flavia; Mandolesi, Alessandra; Bearzi, Italo; Fasano, Alessio (January 2007). "A prospective, double-blind, placebo-controlled trial to establish a safe gluten threshold for patients with celiac disease". The American Journal of Clinical Nutrition. 85 (1): 160–166. doi:10.1093/ajcn/85.1.160. PMID 17209192.
- Fasano, Alessio (August 2009). "Surprises from Celiac Disease". Scientific American. 301 (2): 54–61. doi:10.1038/scientificamerican0809-54 (inactive 31 July 2025).
- Fasano, Alessio (2012). "Zonulin, regulation of tight junctions, and autoimmune diseases". Annals of the New York Academy of Sciences. 1258 (1): 25–33. Bibcode:2012NYASA1258...25F. doi:10.1111/j.1749-6632.2012.06538.x. PMC 3384703. PMID 22731712.
- Sapone, Anna; Lammers, Karen M; Casolaro, Vincenzo; Cammarota, Marcella; Giuliano, Maria Teresa; De Rosa, Mario; Stefanile, Rosita; Mazzarella, Giuseppe; Tolone, Carlo; Russo, Maria Itria; Esposito, Pasquale; Ferraraccio, Franca; Cartenì, Maria; Riegler, Gabriele; de Magistris, Laura; Fasano, Alessio (9 March 2011). "Divergence of gut permeability and mucosal immune gene expression in two gluten-associated conditions: celiac disease and gluten sensitivity". BMC Medicine. 9 23. doi:10.1186/1741-7015-9-23. PMC 3065425. PMID 21392369.
