= Faecalibacterium =

Scientific classification
- Domain: Bacteria
- Kingdom: Bacillati
- Phylum: Bacillota
- Class: Clostridia
- Order: Eubacteriales
- Family: Oscillospiraceae
- Genus: Faecalibacterium; Duncan et al., 2002

Type species
- Faecalibacterium prausnitzii (Hauduroy et al. 1937) Duncan et al. 2002

Species
- See text

Species of bacterium

Faecalibacterium is a genus of bacteria. The genus contains several species including Faecalibacterium prausnitzii, Faecalibacterium butyricigenerans, Faecalibacterium longum, Faecalibacterium duncaniae, Faecalibacterium hattorii, and Faecalibacterium gallinarum. Its first known species, Faecalibacterium prausnitzii is gram-positive, mesophilic, rod-shaped, and anaerobic, and is one of the most abundant and important commensal bacteria of the human gut microbiota. It is non-spore forming and non-motile. These bacteria produce butyrate and other short-chain fatty acids through the fermentation of dietary fiber. The production of butyrate makes them an important member of the gut microbiota, fighting against inflammation.

== History ==
Formerly assigned to the genus Fusobacterium in the phylum Fusobacteriota, Faecalibacterium prausnitzii was re-assigned to its own genus when phylogenetic analysis of isolates showed it to be a member of the phylum Bacillota. As of 2002, it is regarded as a member of the Oscillospiraceae in Clostridium cluster IV. Although the Oscillospiraceae are largely gram-negative bacteria, Faecalibacterium prausnitzii resembles a gram-positive bacterium in its staining. This can be ascribed to the fact that it lacks lipopolysaccharides in its outer membrane, so that, in staining, it more closely resembles gram-positive bacteria, than gram-negative.

== Phylogeny ==
The currently accepted taxonomy is based on the List of Prokaryotic names with Standing in Nomenclature (LPSN) and National Center for Biotechnology Information (NCBI)

16S rRNA based LTP_10_2024

- Faecalibacterium
  - F. gallinarum
  - - F. hattorii
    - - F. prausnitzii
      - - - F. butyricigenerans Zou et al. 2021
          - F. longum
        - - F. duncaniae
          - F. hominis Liu et al. 2023 non Afrizal et al. 2022

120 marker proteins based GTDB 09-RS220

- Faecalibacterium
  - - F. prausnitzii (Hauduroy et al. 1937) Duncan et al. 2002
    - - F. longum Zou et al. 2021
      - - F. duncaniae Sakamoto et al. 2022
        - F. hattorii Sakamoto et al. 2022
  - - - "Ca. F. intestinavium" Gilroy et al. 2021
      - F. gallinarum Sakamoto et al. 2022
    - - "Ca. F. avium" Gilroy et al. 2021
      - - "Ca. F. faecipullorum" Gilroy et al. 2021
        - - "Ca. F. intestinigallinarum" Gilroy et al. 2021
          - - "Ca. F. faecigallinarum" Gilroy et al. 2021
            - "Ca. F. gallistercoris" Gilroy et al. 2021

Species incertae sedis:

- "F. faecis" Hitch et al. 2024
- "F. hominis" Afrizal et al. 2022 non Liu et al. 2023
- "F. intestinale" Hitch et al. 2024
- "F. langellae" Plomp & Harmsen 2024
- F. taiwanense Liou et al. 2024
- "F. tardum" Hitch et al. 2024
- F. wellingii Plomp & Harmsen 2025

== Genetics ==
Faecalibacterium prausnitzii has a genome 2,868,932 bp long and has a GC-content of 56.9%. The bacterium has been found to have 2,707 coding sequences, including 77 RNAs encoding genes. 128 metabolic pathways have been reconstructed, as well as 27 protein complexes and 64 tRNAs. Phylogenetically, the strains of F. prausnitzii compose phylogroups I and II. Most of the new isolates of this species isolated by Muhammad Tanweer Khan belong to phylogroup II. A protein produced by this bacterium has been linked to anti-inflammatory effects.

== Faecalibacterium prausnitzii in laboratory conditions ==
Faecalibacterium prausnitzii is strictly anaerobic, and accordingly difficult to culture in the laboratory. However, with due attention to the requisite conditions and media, it is possible to culture the species in vitro. The rich medium YCFA (Yeast Casitone Fatty Acids) is suitable for the growth of this bacterium in anaerobic conditions. Another media suitable for the growth of F. prausnitzii is YBHI. Any liquid media or agar plates should be pretreated beforehand for 24 hours in an anaerobic chamber, to ensure they are completely anaerobic.

== Clinical relevance ==
In healthy adults, Faecalibacterium prausnitzii represent approximately 5% of the total fecal microbiota but this can increase to around 15% in some individuals, making it one of the most common gut bacteria. The anti-inflammatory properties of its metabolites may alleviate imbalances between intestinal bacterial populations that lead to dysbiosis. It is one of the main producers of butyrate in the intestine. Since butyrate inhibits the production of NF-kB and IFN-y, both involved in the pro-inflammatory response, Faecalibacterium prausnitzii acts as an anti-inflammatory gut bacterium. By blocking the NF-kB pathway, F. prausnitzii indirectly inhibits the production of the pro-inflammatory IL-8, secreted by the intestinal epithelial cells. Other research has shown that there is a correlation between high populations of Faecalibacterium prausnitzii, low IL-12 abundance, and higher IL-10 production. The upregulated IL-10 inhibits the secretion of IFN-y, TNF-alpha, IL-6, and IL-12, which are all pro-inflammatory cytokines. Apart from butyrate, F. prausnitzii produce formate and D-lactate as byproducts of fermentation of glucose and acetate. Lower than usual levels of F. prausnitzii in the intestines have been associated with Crohn's disease, obesity, asthma and major depressive disorder. Higher than usual levels of the F06 clade of F. prausnitzii have been associated with atopic dermatitis. Faecalibacterium prausnitzii can improve gut barrier function. Supernatant of F. prausnitzii has been shown to improve the gut barrier by affecting the permeability of epithelial cells. Another way that F. prausnitzii improves the gut barrier is by improving the permeability and the expression of tightly bound proteins - e-cadherin and occludin. Both of them increase the tight junctions between cells, strengthen the gut barrier and alleviate inflammation.

=== Faecalibacterium prausnitzii and other bacteria ===
Studies show that Faecalibacterium prausnitzii interacts with other bacteria, which affects its butyrate production, and survival. When F. prausnitzii is cultured with Bacteroides thetaiotaomicron, it produces more butyric acid than standing alone, F. prausnitzii also benefits from growing with certain other bacteria. For example, in order to survive in the gut environment, it requires certain bacteria to be preexisting. B. thetaiotaomicron and Escherichia coli are needed to create a suitable environment for F. prausnitzii by reducing the redox potential and alter the composition of the nutrients.

=== Inflammatory bowel disease ===
Most studies of Crohn's disease, as of 2015, with one exception, found reduced levels of F. prausnitzii in both fecal and mucosal samples. The lower abundance of these bacteria is not only associated with the chance of developing IBD, but also with the chance of relapsing after a successful therapy. People with lower abundance are six times more likely to relapse in the future. However, it is a fastidious organism sensitive to oxygen and difficult to deliver to the intestine.

Exclusive enteral nutrition, which is known to induce remission in Crohn's, has been found to reduce F. prausnitzii in responders. This could be due to the lack of specific nutrients that the bacteria need to survive.

=== Biomarker relevance ===
Faecalibacterium prausnitzii can also serve as a biomarker for distinguishing between different intestinal inflammatory conditions. It is an efficient biomarker to differentiate between Crohn's disease and colorectal cancer. A more efficient biomarker is F. prausnitzii in comparison to E. coli as a complementary indicator (F-E index). This index serves well in differentiating between colorectal cancer and ulcerative colitis.

Combining both the host serological data plus microbiological indicators could serve as good biomarker, since it has been reported that Crohn's disease and ulcerative colitis can be differentiated based on monitoring of F. prausnitzii in conjunction with leukocyte count.

== See also ==
- IMPDH RNA motif, a transcription regulator in Faecalibacterium
