= Environmental enteropathy =

Disorder of chronic intestinal inflammation

- Other names: Tropical enteropathy or Environmental enteric dysfunction
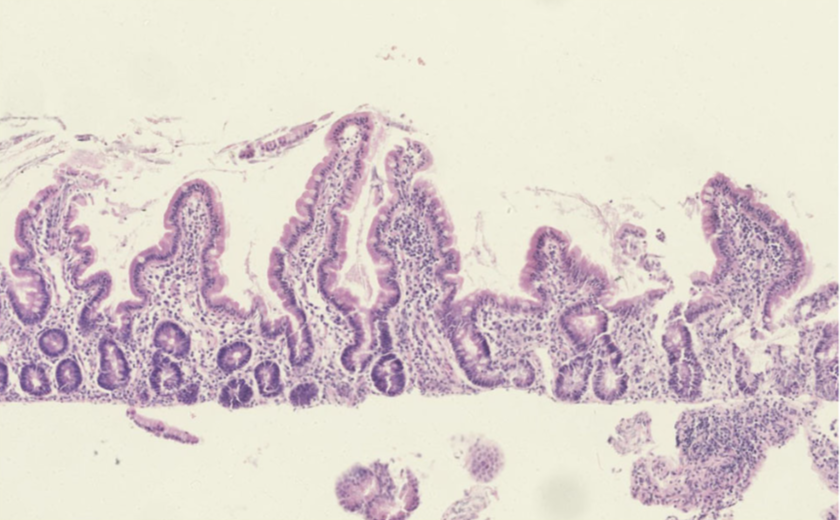
- Histological evidence of enteropathy (inflammatory infiltrate, villus blunting) seen in this intestinal biopsy from a child with malnutrition.
- Specialty: Gastroenterology
- Symptoms: Asymptomatic (most common), altered stool consistency, increased stool frequency, weight loss
- Complications: Malnutrition, malabsorption, growth stunting, developmental delay, impaired response to oral vaccines
- Duration: Chronic
- Causes: Unsanitary food and water sources, fecal-oral contamination, chronic enteric infections, mucosal inflammation
- Diagnostic method: Intestinal biopsy (gold standard), abnormal sugar absorption test, clinical (significantly more common)
- Differential diagnosis: Tropical sprue
- Prevention: Sanitation

Environmental enteropathy (EE or tropical enteropathy or environmental enteric dysfunction or EED) is an acquired small intestinal disorder characterized by gut inflammation, reduced absorptive surface area in small intestine, and disruption of intestinal barrier function. EE is most common amongst children living in low-resource settings. Acute symptoms are typically minimal or absent. EE can lead to malnutrition, anemia (iron-deficiency anemia and anemia of chronic inflammation), stunted growth, impaired brain development, and impaired response to oral vaccinations.

The cause of EE is multifactorial. Overall, exposure to contaminated food and water leads to a generalized state of intestinal inflammation. The inflammatory response results in multiple pathological changes to the gastrointestinal tract: Smaller villi, larger crypts (called crypt hyperplasia), increased permeability, and inflammatory cell build-up within the intestines. These changes result in poor absorption of food, vitamins and minerals.

Standardized, clinically practical diagnostic criteria do not exist. The most accurate diagnostic test is intestinal biopsy. However, this test is invasive and unnecessary for most patients.

Prevention is the strongest and most reliable option for preventing EE and its effects. Therefore, prevention and treatment of EE are often discussed together.

== Signs and symptoms ==
Environmental enteropathy is believed to result in chronic malnutrition and subsequent growth stunting (low height-for-age measurement) as well as other child development deficits.

=== Long-term symptoms ===
- Malnutrition
  - EE causes malnutrition by way of both malabsorption and nutritional deficiencies.
- Growth and physical development
  - The first two years (and the prior 9 months of fetal life) are critical for linear growth. Stunting is an easy to measure symptom of these child development deficits.
- Neurocognitive (brain development)
- Effect on oral vaccination
  - Many oral vaccines, both live and non-living, have proven to be less immunogenic or less protective when administered to infants, children or adults living in low socioeconomic conditions in developing countries than they are when used in industrialized countries. Widespread EE is hypothesized to be a contributing cause for this observation.

=== Nutrient intake and nutritional status in environmental enteropathy ===
The relationship between dietary intake and infection is difficult to study since it is reciprocal in nature. Further, the gut tissue consumes the nutrients it requires before passage of excess nutrients to the rest of the body. The benefits achieved by improved nutrient intake on environmental enteropathy may thus be independent of nutritional status. Nutrient intake during inflammation is usually decreased.

Reports of "poor appetite" by caregivers in LMICs, and restriction of complementary foods during illness is common. Appetite may be reduced both by pro-inflammatory cytokines and leptin and low zinc status, and may be continuous in children with environmental enteropathy. Nutrient availability for growth in environmental enteropathy is further limited due to reduced intestinal surface area and loss of enzymatic activity causing malabsorption of nutrients and, following microbial translocation, retention of circulating nutrients (i.e vitamin A, zinc and iron) in body tissues in order to starve pathogens. Associations between nutrient intake and biomarkers for nutrient status and nutrient status and growth are thus likely distorted in children with inflammation.

The systemic inflammation resulting from microbial translocation will increase basal metabolic rate and nutrient needs by the immune system. At the same time, nutrient losses increase due to intestinal secretion. The associations are thus complex, and further complicated by intestinal host-pathogen-microbiome interactions and the effects of these interactions on intestinal nutrient availability, where additional research is needed. Finally, evidence of whether nutrition interventions may be successful in children with repeated episodes of infection or persistent subclinical infection is scant. Meanwhile, there seems to be agreement that successful interventions to improve complementary feeding practices and reduce stunting must encompass both immediate and underlying causes.

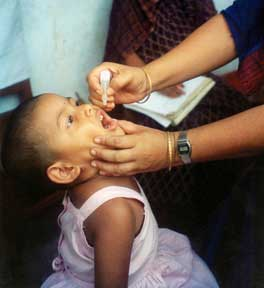
Child receiving oral polio vaccine. There is some evidence that the enteric dysfunction characteristic of EE may impair the efficacy of oral vaccinations.

== Causes ==
The development of environmental enteropathy (EE) is multifactorial, but predominantly associated with chronic exposure to contaminated food and water. This is especially true in environments where widespread open defecation and lack of sanitation are common.

The main cause of environmental enteropathy is likely repeated exposure to enteric pathogens through fecal contamination. Rotavirus, norovirus, cryptosporidium, shigella, campylobacter and E-coli are among the most prevalent causative agents.

== Mechanism ==
Long-term exposure to environmental pathogens leads to a generalized state of intestinal inflammation. Chronic inflammation leads to both functional and structural changes which alter gut permeability and ability of the intestine to absorb nutrients.

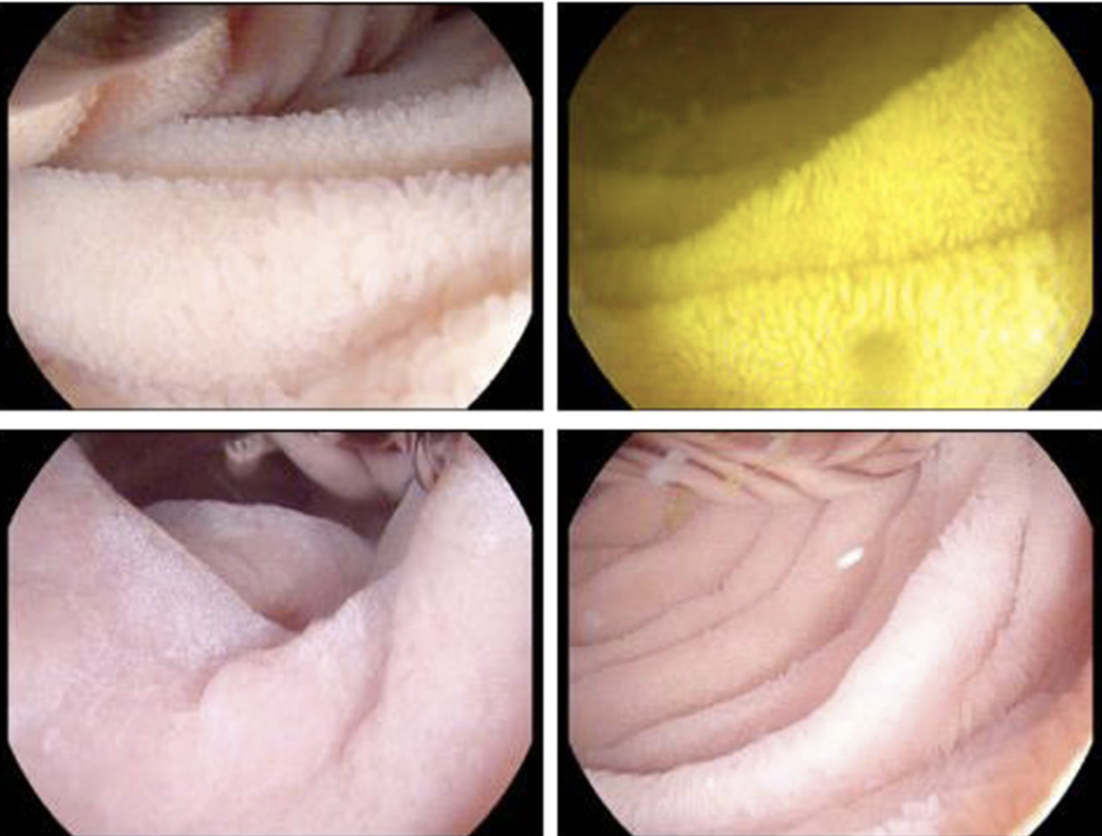
Evidence of villous atrophy in endoscopic images of the small intestine.

Specifically, structural changes within the intestine include smaller villi, larger crypts (called crypt hyperplasia), increased permeability, and inflammatory cell build-up within the intestines. These changes result in poor absorption of food, vitamins and minerals – or "modest malabsorption".

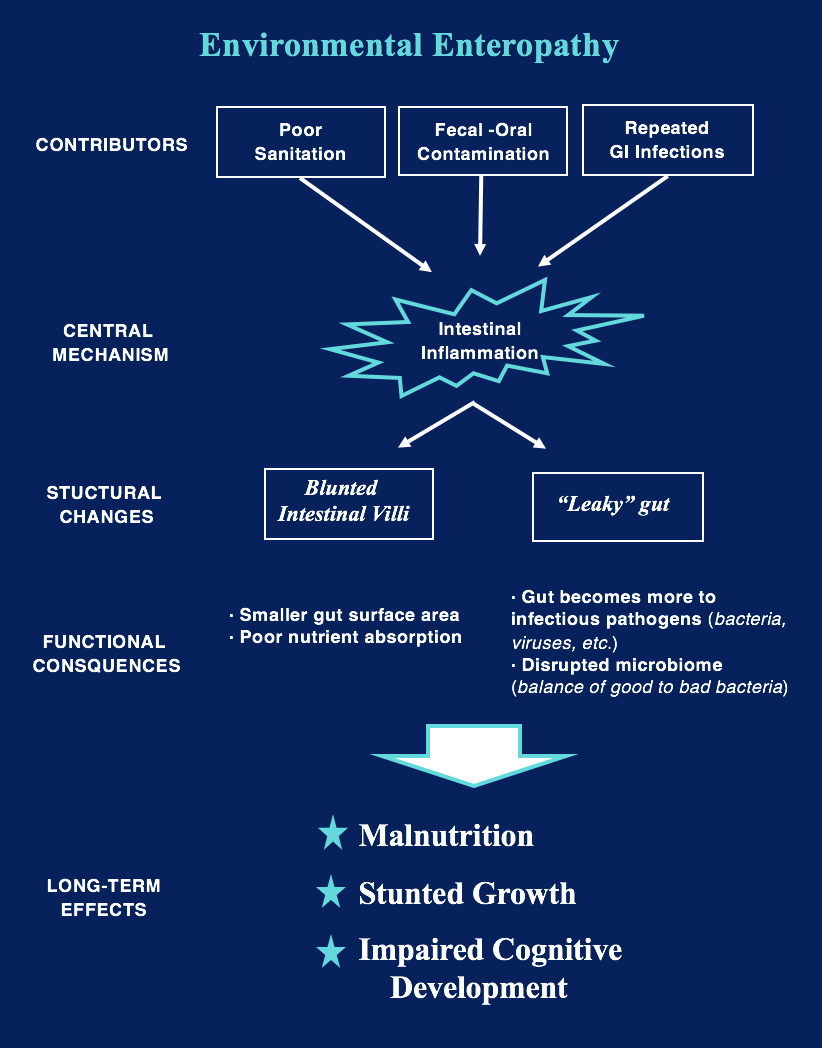
Simplified mechanism outlining causes and effects of EE.

== Diagnosis ==
The current gold standard diagnostic test for EE is intestinal biopsy and histological analysis. Histological changes observed include:

- Villous blunting
- Crypt hypertrophy
- Villous fusion
- Mucosal inflammation

The key histological features are villous flattening, crypt hyperplasia and inflammation in the epithelium and lamina propria.

However, this procedure is considered too invasive, complex and expensive to be implemented as standard of care. As a result, there are various research efforts underway to identify biomarkers associated with EE, which could serve as less invasive, yet representative, tools to screen for and identify EE from stool samples. In an effort to identify simple, accurate diagnostic tests for EE, the Bill and Melinda Gates Foundation (BMGF) has established an EE biomarkers consortium as part of their Global Grand Challenges initiative (specifically, the Discover Biomarkers of Gut Function challenge).

So far, various biomarkers have been selected and studied based on the current understanding of EE pathophysiology:

- Gut permeability/barrier function
  - Dual sugar permeability (lactose-to-mannitol ratio)
- Intestinal inflammation
  - Alpha-1 anti-trypsin
  - Neopterin
  - Myeloperoxidase
- Exocrine (hormonal) markers
- Bacterial translocation markers
  - Endotoxin core antibody
- Markers of systemic inflammation
  - Alpha-1 glycoprotein
  - C-reactive protein (CRP)

It is postulated that the limited of understanding of EE is partially due to the paucity of reliable biomarkers, making it difficult for researchers to track the epidemiology of the condition and assess the efficacy of interventions. EE is described as a reversible condition which is probabilistically associated with poor development, but is neither a necessary nor a sufficient cause and may lead to no observable clinical outcomes. This contributes to difficulties encountered when assessing EE.

=== Classification ===
In the 1960s, researchers reported a syndrome of non-specific histopathological and functional changes to the small intestine in individuals living in unsanitary conditions. This syndrome was observed predominantly in tropical regions across Latin America, sub-Saharan Africa and Asia. The geographic distribution of the syndrome lead to the original term of "tropical enteropathy" (sometimes also "tropical jejunopathy").

Following initial reports, further investigation revealed that these symptoms were not specific to tropical climates. For example, individuals in more wealthy tropical countries, such as Qatar and Singapore, did not exhibit these symptoms. Similarly, subsequent studies have shown this condition to be common across the developing world, closely associated with impoverished conditions but independent of climate or geography. As a result, the term "environmental enteropathy" was introduced to specify that this condition is not only found in tropical areas and is believed to be caused by environmental factors.

== Prevention ==
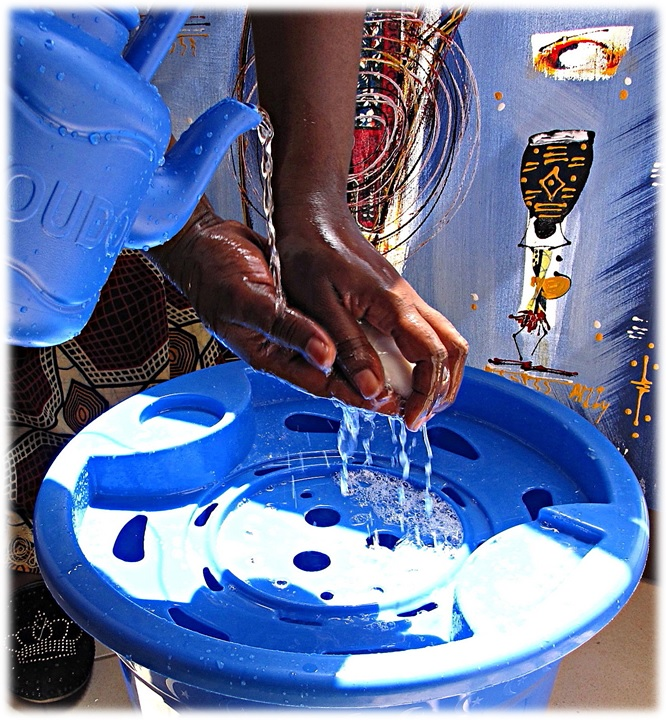
Sanitary measures, such as hand-washing before preparing food, is recommended in the prevention of EE.

Prevention focuses on improving access to improved water, sanitation and hygiene (WASH). Another important factor responsible for EE is contaminated soil in child play spaces, often caused by the presence of livestock such as chicken in the household. Creating a clean play space might therefore be an effective preventive measure for EE in toddlers. Some potential strategies to prevent EE are:

- Improve Water, Sanitation and Hygiene practice both at individual and household levels
- Reduce faecal contamination of food and water
- Limit exposure to livestock and poultry

== Treatment ==
There is no effective and accepted treatment for EE. Treatment focuses on addressing the central components of intestinal inflammation, bacterial overgrowth and nutritional supplementation. Some potential interventions to improve symptoms associated with EE are:

- Exclusive breastfeeding
- Improve dietary diversity
- Use of prebiotics, probiotics, and synbiotics
- Dietary interventions such as egg and milk
- Multiple micronutrient supplements
- Supplementation with lactoferrin and lysozyme
- Antimicrobials in the context of acute malnutrition and infection

The role of nutrition in environmental enteropathy is increasingly being recognized. Environmental enteropathy is likely associated with energy deficiency and underweight. Mice fed a moderately energy- and protein deficient diet who are exposed to intestinal pathogens show traits similar to environmental enteropathy. Further, weight gain in malnourished children is shown to improve environmental enteropathy. Severe malnourishment is also likely associated with microbiota immaturity, which might increase environmental enteropathy. The intestinal mucosa turnover is dynamic, nutrient-dependent and rapid, and malnourished children have rate-limiting stores for repairing mucosal damage.

The nutrients known to contribute to intestinal regeneration and improved barrier function are sulphur containing amino acids, glutamine, vitamin A and zinc. Meanwhile, studies investigating associations between glutamine or vitamin A supplementation, serum retinol or zinc supplementation either alone, in combination with vitamin A or with micronutrients and antibiotics and environmental enteropathy show mixed results.

Gut barrier repair and gut function may also be improved by a reduction in the inflammatory response. Short-chain fatty acids (SCFA) result from fermentation of non starch polysaccharides in the colon. It is likely that short-chain fatty acids in addition to zinc and polyunsaturated fatty acids (PUFAs) may reduce gastrointestinal inflammation. Although neither fibre nor polyunsaturated fatty acids provided as supplements improved lactulose:mannitol (L:M) ratio or inflammation in intervention trials, an increased protein and fibre intake from legumes as complementary food, might improve environmental enteropathy. Cessation of breastfeeding and introduction of complementary foods, especially foods with high fibre and protein content, also likely increases microbiota diversity, which might benefit the intestine. As for micronutrient intake and environmental enteropathy, studies from Africa have demonstrated that multiple micronutrient supplementation may improve lactulose:mannitol (L:M) ratio in adults, and transiently in children. Finally, despite the diverse roles attributed to zinc in environmental enteropathy the effect of supplementation as prophylaxis is uncertain. This may partly be due to the perturbed nutrient metabolism occurring in environmental enteropathy.

== Epidemiology ==
Environmental enteropathy (EE) primarily affects children living in low- and middle-income countries (LMICs). Children living in these countries were found to have enteric pathogens related to EE in their systems throughout much of their early childhoods. Gastrointestinal abnormalities associated with EE are not congenital but are acquired during infancy and persist into adulthood. Such abnormalities tend to develop after the first semester of life and are not present in newborns.

Historically, environmental enteropathy has been prevalent in LMICs. The geographic distribution of environmental enteropathy has shown an increase in incidence in such areas of poor sanitation and hygiene. EE was first described in studies from the 1960-70s conducted in Asia, Africa, the Indian subcontinent, and Central America, during which it was discovered that signs of EE were high among otherwise healthy adults and children. A study from 1971 following US Peace Corps volunteers is often cited as being the first study to demonstrate the ability to acquire and recover from EE according to the environment. Participants experienced symptoms of chronic enteric infection during and shortly after returning from their placement in low- and middle-income countries. Symptoms experienced by those abroad were resolved within one to two years after returning home to the US. These results lead to the suggestion of the environment being a cause of EE, and a later study in Zambia was able to draw similar conclusions. By the early 1990s, environmental enteropathy was found to be a widespread problem affecting infants and children. Today, enteric infections and diarrheal diseases like environmental enteropathy account for 760,000 deaths per year worldwide, making EE the second leading cause of death in children under five years old.

The exact causes and consequences of EE have been difficult to establish due, in part, to the lack of a clear disease definition. However, risk factors do exist and they can be both environmental and nutritional. Preexisting conditions such as micronutrient deficiencies, diarrheal diseases, and various chronic infections all serve as risk factors for EE. Environmental conditions such as poor sanitation and unimproved water sources also contribute to the prevalence of EE. Exposure to environmental microbial agents such as these is thought to be the most important factor in the development of EE.

== Research initiatives ==
There are multiple large-field, multi-country research initiatives focusing on strategies to prevent and treat EE.

- The MAL-ED project
- The Bangladesh Environmental Enteric Dysfunction (BEED) Study (ClinicalTrials.gov Identifier: NCT02812615)
- The Study of Environmental Enteropathy and Malnutrition (SEEM) in Pakistan (ClinicalTrials.gov Identifier: NCT03588013)
- The Alive and Thrive nutrition project
- The Sanitation, Hygiene and Infant Nutrition Efficacy (SHINE) Trial (ClinicalTrials.gov identifier: NCT01824940)
- The WASH Benefits Study
