= Tripropionin =

Names
- IUPAC name 2,3-di(propanoyloxy)propyl propanoate
- Other names Glycerol tripropionate; Glyceryl tripropionate; Glyceryl tripropanoate; Tripropionylglycerol; Tripropionine

Identifiers
CAS Number	139-45-7
3D model (JSmol)	Interactive image
ChEBI	CHEBI:88153
ChemSpider	8433
ECHA InfoCard	100.004.878
EC Number	205-365-1
PubChem CID	8763
UNII	F8L8EVQ6QB
CompTox Dashboard (EPA)	DTXSID8051702
- InChI: InChI=1S/C12H20O6/c1-4-10(13)16-7-9(18-12(15)6-3)8-17-11(14)5-2/h9H,4-8H2,1-3H3 Key: YZWRNSARCRTXDS-UHFFFAOYSA-N
- SMILES: CCC(=O)OCC(COC(=O)CC)OC(=O)CC

Properties
Chemical formula	C_{12}H_{20}O_{6}
Molar mass	260.286 g·mol^{−1}
- Except where otherwise noted, data are given for materials in their standard state (at 25 °C [77 °F], 100 kPa). Infobox references

Tripropionin, also known as glyceryl tripropionate, is a short-chain triglyceride (fat) composed of glycerol and three propionate (propionic acid) moieties. It is a gradually converted precursor or prodrug of the short-chain fatty acid propionate and can be used to deliver this fatty acid. Propionate itself is limited by an unpleasant smell and taste like vomit or body odor as well as rapid metabolism. Tripropionin, via conversion into propionate, has been found to restore gut microbiota diversity, reduce colitis symptoms, improve gut barrier integrity, and produce anti-inflammatory effects in rodents. There is interest in tripropionin, along with other short-chain triglycerides like tributyrin and triacetin, for potential use in dietary supplements and in treatment of gastrointestinal and other medical problems. However, unlike other short-chain fatty acids, propionate has also been associated with various adverse effects, for instance neurotoxic effects, inflammation, increased anxiety and depression, and social impairment, with some such as anxiety and social deficits related to downregulation of the oxytocin receptor.

== See also ==
- Propionic acid (propionate)
- Triacetin
- Tributyrin
