= SerBut =

Clinical data
- Other names: O-Butyryl-L-serine; O-Butanoyl-L-serine; Serine–butyrate conjugate; Seryl-butyrate
- Drug class: Butyric acid prodrug
- ATC code: None

Identifiers
- IUPAC name: (2S)-2-amino-3-butanoyloxypropanoic acid
- CAS Number: 63321-66-4
- PubChem CID: 11651229
- ChemSpider: 9825967

Chemical and physical data
- Formula: C_{7}H_{13}NO_{4}
- Molar mass: 175.184 g·mol^{−1}
- 3D model (JSmol): Interactive image
- SMILES: CCCC(=O)OC[C@@H](C(=O)O)N
- InChI: InChI=1S/C7H13NO4/c1-2-3-6(9)12-4-5(8)7(10)11/h5H,2-4,8H2,1H3,(H,10,11)/t5-/m0/s1; Key:HTDGDRZVMBNEMO-YFKPBYRVSA-N

SerBut, also known as O-butyryl-L-serine or as seryl-butyrate, is an ester conjugate of the short-chain fatty acid butyric acid (butyrate) and the amino acid serine. It is a prodrug of butyric acid with high oral bioavailability and enhanced blood–brain barrier permeability in animals. The drug makes use of amino acid transporters for absorption and transport. It shows anti-inflammatory effects in rodents including in models of autoimmune diseases and neuroinflammation. The use of butyric acid itself is hindered by its rapid metabolism in the gastrointestinal tract and other limitations. The chemical synthesis of SerBut has been described. SerBut was first described in the scientific literature by 2024.

== See also ==
- Butyric acid
- Tributyrin
