= IMPDH RNA motif =

IMPDH
- Consensus secondary structure and sequence conservation of IMPDH RNA

Identifiers
- Symbol: IMPDH
- Rfam: RF02994

Other data
- RNA type: Gene; sRNA
- SO: SO:0001263
- PDB structures: PDBe

The IMPDH RNA motif is a conserved RNA structure that was discovered by bioinformatics. IMPDH motif RNAs are found in organisms classified within the genus Faecalibacterium.

IMPDH RNAs are often located upstream of genes that encode inosine monophosphate dehydrogenase. However, some instances of the IMPDH motif are not upstream of protein-coding genes. Therefore, it is ambiguous whether IMPDH RNAs function as cis-regulatory elements or whether they operate in trans.

The IMPDH RNA motif includes one pseudoknot, but one stem involved in this apparent pseudoknot exhibits only one example of covariation, so the existence of the pseudoknot is unclear.

The motif does not bind as a riboswitch. Instead, it is suggested that it regulates transcription by "misincorporation" of inosine instead of one of the usual nucleotides (with ITP in place of GTP) into a string of RNA. In Faecalibacterium prausnitzii, this causes transcription to be terminated. There may also be a role for the motif's binding to the bacterium's IMPDH protein.
