= Triacetin =

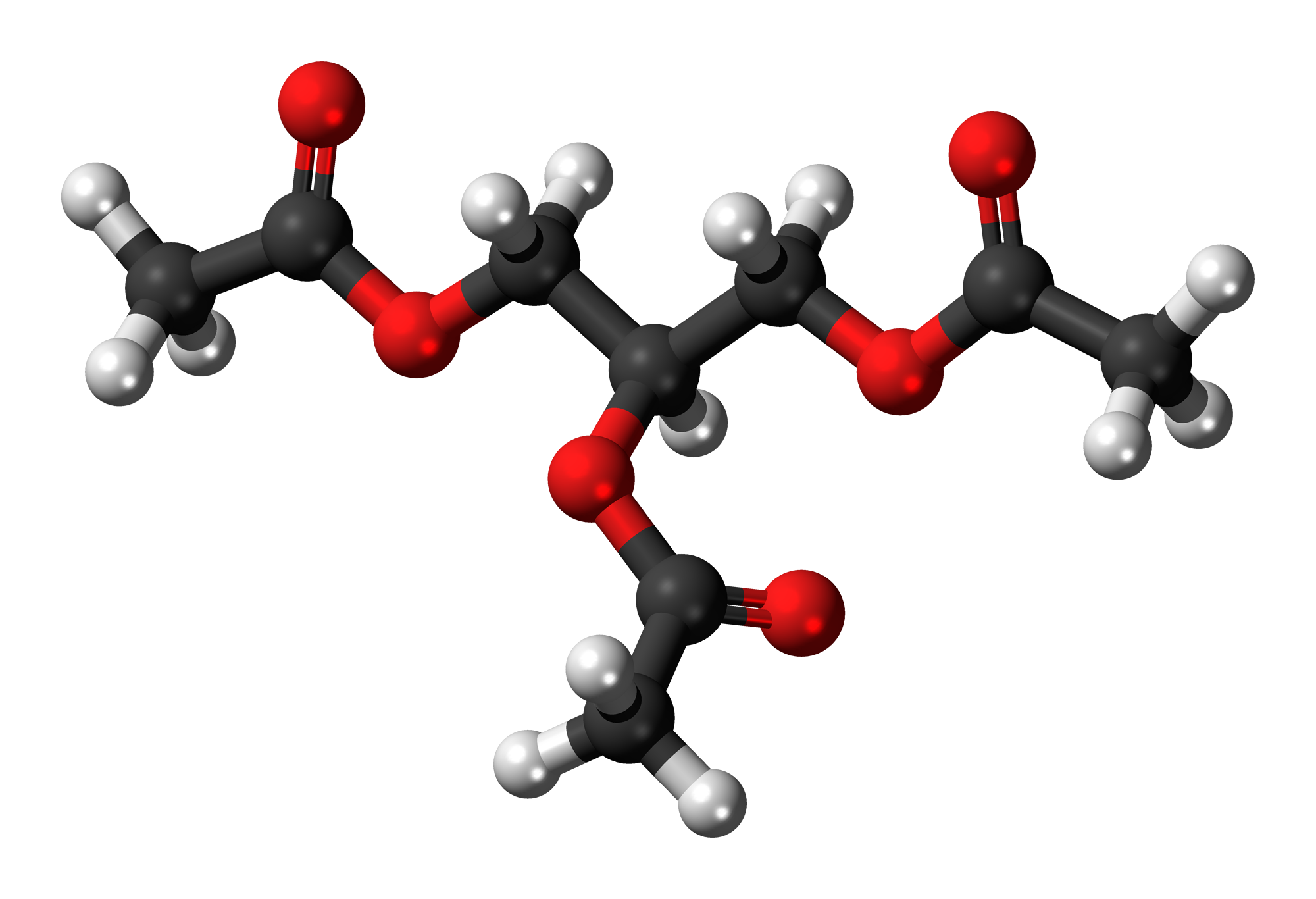

Names
- Systematic IUPAC name Propane-1,2,3-triyl triacetate
- Other names: Glyceryl triacetate; Glycerol triacetate; glycerin triacetate; 1,2,3-triacetylglycerol; 1,2,3-triacetoxypropane

Identifiers
CAS Number	102-76-1
3D model (JSmol)	Interactive image
ChEBI	CHEBI:9661
ChEMBL	ChEMBL1489254
ChemSpider	13835706
ECHA InfoCard	100.002.775
EC Number	203-051-9
E number	E1518 (additional chemicals)
KEGG	D00384
PubChem CID	5541
RTECS number	AK3675000
UNII	XHX3C3X673
CompTox Dashboard (EPA)	DTXSID3026691
- InChI: InChI=1S/C9H14O6/c1-6(10)13-4-9(15-8(3)12)5-14-7(2)11/h9H,4-5H2,1-3H3 Key: URAYPUMNDPQOKB-UHFFFAOYSA-N; InChI=1/C9H14O6/c1-6(10)13-4-9(15-8(3)12)5-14-7(2)11/h9H,4-5H2,1-3H3 Key: URAYPUMNDPQOKB-UHFFFAOYAH
- SMILES: CC(=O)OC(COC(=O)C)COC(C)=O

Properties
Chemical formula	C_{9}H_{14}O_{6}
Molar mass	218.205 g·mol^{−1}
Appearance	Oily liquid
Density	1.155 g/cm^{3}
Melting point	−78 °C (−108 °F; 195 K)
Boiling point	259 °C (498 °F; 532 K)
Solubility in water	6.1 g/100 mL
Solubility in ethanol	Miscible
Solubility in benzene	soluble
Solubility in diethyl ether	soluble
Solubility in acetone	very soluble
Vapor pressure	1 Pa (0.0075 mmHg) (37.6 °C (99.7 °F; 310.8 K)); 10 Pa (0.075 mmHg) (62 °C (144 °F; 335 K)); 100 Pa (0.75 mmHg) (90 °C (194 °F; 363 K)); 1 kPa (7.5 mmHg) (124 °C (255 °F; 397 K)); 10 kPa (75 mmHg) (165 °C (329 °F; 438 K)); 100 kPa (750 mmHg) (214 °C (417 °F; 487 K))
Refractive index (n_{D})	1.4301 (20 °C (68 °F; 293 K))
Viscosity	23 mPas (20 °C (68 °F; 293 K))

Thermochemistry
Heat capacity (C)	389 J⋅mol^{−1}·K^{-1}
Std molar entropy (S^{⦵}_{298})	458.3 kJ⋅mol^{−1}·K^{-1}
Std enthalpy of formation (Δ_{f}H^{⦵}_{298})	−1330.8 kJ⋅mol^{−1}
Std enthalpy of combustion (Δ_{c}H^{⦵}_{298})	4211.6 kJ⋅mol^{−1}
Enthalpy of vaporization (Δ_{f}H_{vap})	85.74 kJ⋅mol^{−1}

Hazards
NFPA 704 (fire diamond)	0 1 0
Flash point	138 °C (280 °F; 411 K)
Autoignition temperature	430 °C (806 °F; 703 K)
Explosive limits	7.73%-?
- Lethal dose or concentration (LD, LC)
LD_{50} (median dose)	3 g/kg (rat, oral)
- Except where otherwise noted, data are given for materials in their standard state (at 25 °C [77 °F], 100 kPa). verify (what is ?) Infobox references

Triacetin, also known as glyceryl triacetate, is the organic compound with the formula C_{3}H_{5}(OCOCH_{3})_{3}. It is classified as a triglyceride, i.e., the triester of glycerol with acetic acid. It is a colorless, viscous, and odorless liquid with a high boiling point and a low melting point. It has a mild, sweet taste in concentrations lower than 500 ppm, but may appear bitter at higher concentrations. It is one of the glycerine acetate compounds.

== Uses ==
Triacetin is a common food additive, for instance as a solvent in flavorings, and for its humectant function, with E number E1518 and Australian approval code A1518. It is used as an excipient in pharmaceutical products, where it is used as a humectant, a plasticizer, and as a solvent.

=== Potential uses ===
The plasticizing capabilities of triacetin have been utilized in the synthesis of a biodegradable phospholipid gel system for the dissemination of the cancer drug paclitaxel (PTX). In the study, triacetin was combined with PTX, ethanol, a phospholipid and a medium chain triglyceride to form a gel-drug complex. This complex was then injected directly into the cancer cells of glioma-bearing mice. The gel slowly degraded and facilitated sustained release of PTX into the targeted glioma cells.

Triacetin can also be used as a fuel additive as an antiknock agent for gasoline, and to improve low-temperature viscosity properties of biodiesel.

It has been considered as a possible source of food energy in artificial food regeneration systems on long space missions. It is believed to be safe to get over half of one's dietary energy from triacetin.

==== Supplement and medical use ====
Triacetin is a controlled-release ester prodrug of the short-chain fatty acid acetate (acetic acid) and can be used to deliver acetate in the gut and body. It is cleaved into glycerol and acetate (three per triacetin molecule) by pancreatic and gastric lipases. Triacetin is water-soluble and has been of interest for potential use in parenteral nutrition. It has also been investigated for the potential treatment of irritable bowel syndrome (IBS) and has been marketed for use in dietary supplements use under brand names like REBiome. By delivering acetate, triacetin may increase levels of the major acetate-consuming and butyrate-producing gut bacteria Faecalibacterium prausnitzii. It is a potential alternative to dietary fiber in increasing beneficial butyrate-producing gut bacteria like F. prausnitzii, which is relevant as fiber is often poorly tolerated in people with IBS due to gas production and bloating.

== Synthesis ==
Triacetin was first prepared in 1854 by the French chemist Marcellin Berthelot. Triacetin was prepared in the 19th century from glycerol and acetic acid.

Its synthesis from acetic anhydride and glycerol is simple and inexpensive:

3 (CH_{3}CO)_{2}O + C_{3}H_{5}(OH)_{3} → C_{3}H_{5}(OCOCH_{3})_{3} + 3 CH_{3}CO_{2}H

This synthesis has been conducted with catalytic sodium hydroxide and microwave irradiation to give a 99% yield of triacetin. Synthesis has also been conducted with a cobalt(II) Salen complex catalyst supported by silicon dioxide and heated to 50 °C (122 °F) for 55 minutes to give a 99% yield of triacetin.

== Safety ==
The US Food and Drug Administration has approved it as generally recognized as safe food additive and included it in the database according to the opinion from the Select Committee On GRAS Substances (SCOGS). Triacetin is included in the SCOGS database since 1975.

Triacetin was not toxic to animals in studies of exposure through repeated inhalation over a relatively short period.

== See also ==
- Acetic acid (acetate)
- Tripropionin
- Tributyrin
