= David J. Brayden =

Pharmaceutical scientist

- Occupations: Pharmaceutical scientist, researcher, and academic

Academic background
- Education: B.Sc. in Pharmacology and Toxicology; M.Sc. in Pharmacology; M.Phil. in Pharmacology; Ph.D. in Pharmacology
- Alma mater: University College Dublin (UCD); University of Cambridge

David J. Brayden is a pharmaceutical scientist, researcher, and academic. He is a full professor of advanced drug delivery at the University College Dublin (UCD).

Brayden's research has focused on peptide delivery across intestinal and buccal epithelia, utilizing nanoparticle and permeation enhancer constructs for oral peptide administration, evaluating high-content toxicology in cells, and developing nanoparticle formulations for intra-articular injection for arthritis.

Brayden is a fellow of the Controlled Release Society and a member of the Royal Irish Academy.

== Education ==
Brayden completed his B.Sc. in Pharmacology and Toxicology and M.Sc. in Pharmacology at UCD in 1984 and 1985, respectively. He later earned an M.Phil. in Pharmacology in 1986 and a Ph.D. in Pharmacology in 1989 from the University of Cambridge.

== Career ==
From 1988 to 1989, Brayden worked as a research assistant at the University of Cambridge. He undertook a postdoctoral fellowship at Stanford University in 1989. In 2001, he joined UCD as an assistant professor and was promoted to associate professor in 2005, to professor in 2006, and to full professor in 2014.

Between 2003 and 2006, Brayden was the co-founding chairperson of the UK–Ireland Chapter of the Controlled Release Society. He was employed as the Deputy Coordinator of an EU 7th Framework grant on oral nanomedicines, TRANS-INT. He holds the role of Co-lead principal Investigator at CÚRAM, the Research Ireland Centre for Medical Devices, and is the coordinator of the Horizon Europe Consortium, BUCCAL-PEP. He is the Field Chief Editor of Frontiers in Drug Delivery.

Brayden was appointed to Ireland's National Research Ethics Committee for Clinical Trials by the Minister for Health in 2021, and in 2024 became chairperson of NREC-CT D. In 2026, he received the higher doctorate of Doctor of Science (DSc) from the National University of Ireland on the basis of his published work in pharmacology.

== Research ==
Some of Brayden's research has centered on advanced drug delivery systems and strategies to improve the delivery of macromolecules. He has conducted research on poor intestinal permeability of macromolecules, degradation of peptides in the gastrointestinal tract, and the effects of reduced oral bioavailability on therapeutic effectiveness. His studies have investigated intestinal permeation enhancers to promote peptide absorption, technologies aimed at enhancing intestinal absorption, and methods to reduce the need for injectable drug administration.

Another strand of Brayden's work has explored methods such as pH-sensitive encapsulation for delivering macromolecules directly to intestinal regions. These approaches included formulation-based strategies to improve mucosal transport of therapeutic peptides, enabling controlled and site-specific drug release. He has also contributed to translational and interdisciplinary research in drug delivery technologies. He worked on oral peptide drug delivery using silica-based nanotechnology systems and explored biomaterial-based nanocomplexes for drug delivery applications. He documented that intra-articular nanocomplexes entrapping selected molecules reduce inflammation by modulating inflammatory gene expression. His research has also focused on the development of oral formulations of peptide-based therapies as alternatives to injectable administration.

== Awards and honors ==
- Fellow, Controlled Release Society
- Fellow, American Association of Pharmaceutical Scientists
- 2024 – Member, Royal Irish Academy

== Selected articles ==
- McCartney, Fiona; Jannin, Vincent; Chevrier, Stéphanie; Boulghobra, Hakime; Hristov, Delyan R.; Ritter, Nicolas; Miolane, Cédric; Chavant, Yann; Demarne, Frédéric; Brayden, David J. (2019). "Labrasol® is an efficacious intestinal permeation enhancer across rat intestine: Ex vivo and in vivo rat studies". Journal of Controlled Release. 310: 115–126. doi:10.1016/j.jconrel.2019.08.008. hdl:10197/10965. PMID 31401199.
- Hristov, Delyan; McCartney, Fiona; Beirne, Jason; Mahon, Eugene; Reid, Stephanie; Bhattacharjee, Sourav; Penarier, Geraldine; Werner, Ulrich; Bazile, Didier; Brayden, David J. (2020). "Silica-coated nanoparticles with a core of zinc, l-Arginine, and a peptide designed for oral delivery". ACS Applied Materials & Interfaces. 12 (1): 1257–1269. Bibcode:2020AAMI...12.1257H. doi:10.1021/acsami.9b16104. PMID 31802658.
- Twarog, Caroline; Liu, Kai; O'Brien, Peter J.; Dawson, Kenneth A.; Fattal, Elias; Illel, Brigitte; Brayden, David J. (2020). "A head-to-head Caco-2 assay comparison of the mechanisms of action of the intestinal permeation enhancers: SNAC and sodium caprate (C10)". European Journal of Pharmaceutics and Biopharmaceutics. 152: 95–107. doi:10.1016/j.ejpb.2020.04.023. PMID 32387703.
- Khandelia, Rumi; Hodgkinson, Tom; Crean, Daniel; Brougham, Dermot F.; Scholz, Dimitri; Ibrahim, Hossam; Quinn, Susan J.; Rodriguez, Brian J.; Kennedy, Oran D.; O’Byrne, John M.; Brayden, David J. (2024). "Reproducible synthesis of biocompatible albumin nanoparticles designed for intra-articular administration of celecoxib to treat osteoarthritis". ACS Applied Materials & Interfaces. 16 (12): 14633–14644. Bibcode:2024AAMI...1614633K. doi:10.1021/acsami.4c02243. PMC 10982941. PMID 38483312.
- Karki, Sandeep; Malhotra, Sahil; Ijaz, Muhammad; Rollet, Nicolas; O'Cearbhaill, Eoin D.; Bini, Estela; Brayden, David J. (2026). "A pullulan-based bilayer film for buccal delivery of a GLP-1 peptide analogue". Carbohydrate Polymers. 380 125064. doi:10.1016/j.carbpol.2026.125064. PMID 41831981.
