= Tributyrin =

Triglyceride found in butter

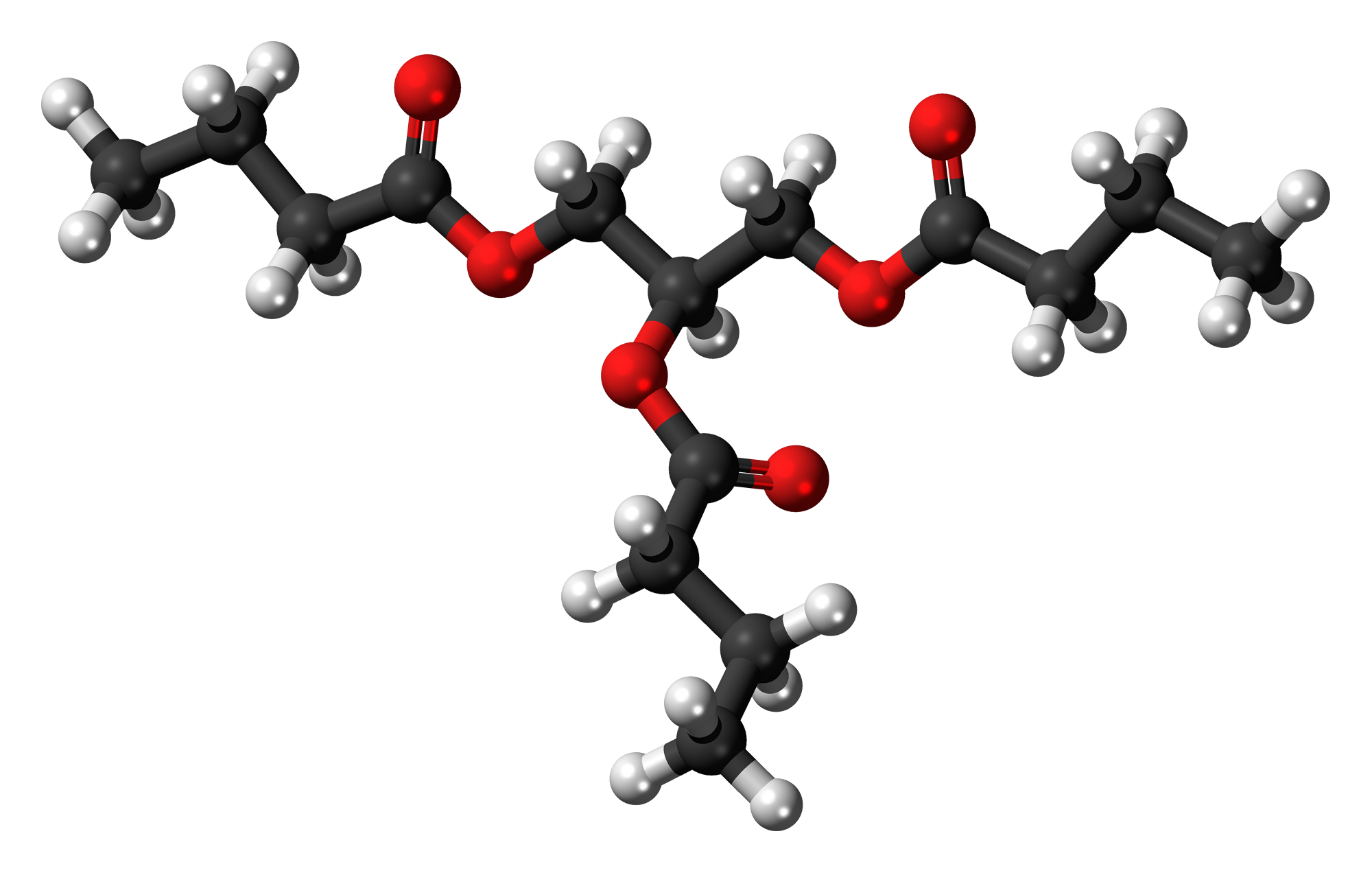

Names
- Systematic IUPAC name Propane-1,2,3-triyl tributanoate
- Other names Tributyrin; Glyceryl tributyrate; Glycerol tributyrate; Glycerin tributyrate; NSC-661583; CoreBiome; ButyraGen

Identifiers
CAS Number	60-01-5
3D model (JSmol)	Interactive image
ChEBI	CHEBI:35020
ChemSpider	13849665
DrugBank	DB12709
ECHA InfoCard	100.000.410
KEGG	C13870
PubChem CID	6050
UNII	S05LZ624MF
CompTox Dashboard (EPA)	DTXSID4052267
- InChI: InChI=1S/C15H26O6/c1-4-7-13(16)19-10-12(21-15(18)9-6-3)11-20-14(17)8-5-2/h12H,4-11H2,1-3H3 Key: UYXTWWCETRIEDR-UHFFFAOYSA-N
- SMILES: CCCC(=O)OCC(COC(=O)CCC)OC(=O)CCC

Properties
Chemical formula	C_{15}H_{26}O_{6}
Molar mass	302.367 g·mol^{−1}
Appearance	Oily liquid with bitter taste
Density	1.032 g/cm^{3}
Melting point	−75 °C (−103 °F; 198 K)
Boiling point	305 to 310 °C (581 to 590 °F; 578 to 583 K)
Solubility in water	Insoluble

Hazards
Safety data sheet (SDS)	Tributyrin MSDS, Fischer Scientific
- Except where otherwise noted, data are given for materials in their standard state (at 25 °C [77 °F], 100 kPa). verify (what is ?) Infobox references

Tributyrin, also known as glyceryl tributyrate, is a triglyceride (fat) naturally present in butter. It is an ester composed of three butyric acid (butyrate) moieties and glycerol. It can be described as a liquid fat with an acrid taste. About 3 to 4% of butter is tributyrin, with butter being the richest known food source of tributyrin. It is a slowly converted precursor or prodrug of the short-chain fatty acid (SCFA) butyric acid, which is a major product of gut bacteria and hence "postbiotic".

== Pharmacology ==
Tributyrin is a precursor or prodrug of the endogenous short-chain fatty acid (SCFA) butyric acid (butyrate). It is stable and is rapidly absorbed and gradually converted into butyric acid. Tributyrin is not broken down by gastric juice and is slowly converted into butyric acid and glycerol by pancreatic lipases in the gut. In addition, tributyrin is more lipophilic than butyric acid and is taken up into cells much more readily in comparison. Butyric acid itself has an extremely short elimination half-life of seconds to minutes among other limitations, which makes its own use impractical.

Butyric acid, the active form of tributyrin, has a large variety of biological effects. It is an agonist of the FFAR2 (GPR43), FFAR3 (GPR41), and GPR109A and a histone deacetylase (HDAC) inhibitor of HDAC classes I and II. In addition, butyric acid is the preferred energy source for colonocytes, and has been found to provide approximately 70% of total energy needs for colonocytes in mice. Butyrate plays a key role in gut homeostasis and has anti-inflammatory effects among others. Tributyrin is described as an HDAC inhibitor similarly to butyric acid.

Tributyrin has been found to reverse gut microbiota dysbiosis and intestinal injury and inflammation induced by antibiotics in rodents. This included increasing potentially beneficial SCFA-producing bacteria such as Muribaculaceae and Bifidobacterium and decreasing potentially pathogenic bacteria such as Bacteroidetes and Enterococcus. One means by which SCFAs like butyrate may mediate such effects is by decreasing intestinal pH. In accordance with the observed intestinal bacterial changes, tributyrin increased levels of the SFCAs butyric acid, acetic acid (acetate), and propionic acid (propionate). The effects of tributyrin and butyrate appear to be dose-dependent, with low concentrations promoting the intestinal barrier and inhibiting inflammation while high concentrations can do the opposite via induction of apoptosis. In addition to reversing antibiotic-induced dysbiosis, tributyrin has been found to strongly reduce Clostridium difficile infection in rodents. Coadministration of tributyrin with the probiotics Limosilactobacillus reuteri and Lacticaseibacillus rhamnosus has been found to synergistically increase butyrate levels in humans ex vivo as well.

In vitro, butyric acid is known to activate the brain-derived neurotrophic factor (BDNF) and tropomyosin receptor kinase B (TrkB) signaling pathway via its HDAC inhibition.

== Other uses ==
Tributyrin is used in microbiological laboratories to identify the bacterium Moraxella catarrhalis.

== Research ==
Tributyrin was under formal clinical development for the treatment of solid tumors in the late 1990s, but no further development was subsequently reported.

== See also ==
- 1,2,3-Tris(4-hydroxybutyroyloxy)propane
- Butyric acid
- SerBut (O-butyryl-L-serine)
- Glyceryl-tris-3-hydroxybutyrate (3GHB)
- Glycerol phenylbutyrate (GPB)
- Triacetin
- Tripropionin
- List of investigational Parkinson's disease drugs
