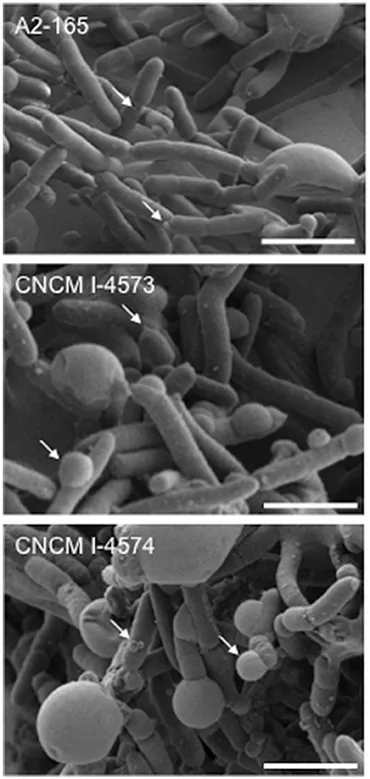
- Fusobacterium prausnitzii under scanning electron microscope.

Scientific classification
- Domain: Bacteria
- Kingdom: Bacillati
- Phylum: Bacillota
- Class: Clostridia
- Order: Eubacteriales
- Family: Oscillospiraceae
- Genus: Faecalibacterium
- Species: F. prausnitzii

Binomial name
- Faecalibacterium prausnitzii (Hauduroy et al. 1937) Duncan et al. 2002

Synonyms
- Bacteroides prausnitzii Fusobacterium prausnitzii

= Faecalibacterium prausnitzii =

Species of bacterium

Faecalibacterium prausnitzii is a non-spore-forming, non-motile, rod-shaped, anaerobic, Gram-positive bacteria species of the genus Faecalibacterium. It is the single most abundant bacteria in the human gut and is the major butyric acid (butyrate)-producing species in the gut.

== Biology ==
=== Occurrence ===
F. prausnitzii is found in the human gut and is the most abundant single bacteria species in the human gut microbiota, making up approximately 5% of the total bacterial population in healthy adults. However, F. prausnitzii can make up as much as 15% of the bacterial population in some people. Many different strains of F. prausnitzii with varying properties are known and have been studied. F. prausnitzii is ubiquitous in humans, detectable in over 85% of individuals.

F. prausnitzii is an extremely oxygen-sensitive bacteria and is difficult to cultivate even under oxygen-free conditions. However, advances have been made in the cultivation of F. prausnitzii.

=== Metabolism ===
The end products of glucose fermentation by F. prausnitzii include acetate (acetic acid), formate, small amounts of D-lactate, and substantial amounts of butyrate (butyric acid). It also consumes acetate and lactate and forms butyrate from them. F. prausnitzii is strictly dependent on acetate and lactate produced by other bacteria such as Bifidobacterium, Bacteroides, and Akkermansia. Salicylic acid is another product of F. prausnitzii. F. prausnitzii is the most important butyrate-producing bacteria in the gut and colon.

Butyrate is a short-chain fatty acid (SCFA) and has a large variety of biological effects. It is an agonist of the FFAR2 (GPR43), FFAR3 (GPR41), and GPR109A and a histone deacetylase (HDAC) inhibitor of HDAC classes I and II. It is known to activate the brain-derived neurotrophic factor (BDNF) and tropomyosin receptor kinase B (TrkB) signaling pathway via its HDAC inhibition and produce associated effects. In addition to its mechanistic actions, butyrate is the preferred energy source for colonocytes, and has been found to provide approximately 70% of total energy needs for colonocytes in mice. Butyrate plays a key role in gut homeostasis and has anti-inflammatory effects among others.

== Role in health and disease ==
F. prausnitzii abundance has been inversely associated with inflammatory bowel diseases such as Crohn's disease and ulcerative colitis. It has also been inversely associated with colorectal cancer and other diseases. In the 2020s, it was found that F. prausnitzii is depleted in people with systemic lupus erythematosus (SLE; "lupus"), and that its restoration could improve symptoms of the disease in animal models. One possible mechanism for these apparent benefits is increased butyrate production and consequent anti-inflammatory effects. Reduced Faecalibacterium prausnitzii abundance and butyrate production has been associated with myalgic encephalomyelitis/chronic fatigue syndrome (ME/CFS) and long COVID and in the case of ME/CFS this has been assessed and found to correlate with fatigue severity as well.

== Influences ==
Prebiotics like fiber, such as fructooligosaccharides (FOS), galactooligosaccharides (GOS), and inulin among others, have been found to increase gut F. prausnitzii abundance. Supplementation with 1-kestose, an FOS, for 10 weeks increased F. prausnitzii levels by 10-fold in healthy adults. Similarly, 1-kestose increased cecal butyrate levels by 10-fold in rodents. Inulin has also been found to increase Faecalibacterium abundance by about an order of magnitude in humans. Maltobionic acid is a functional sugar and has been found to markedly increase F. prausnitzii abundance in humans.

The short-chain triglyceride triacetin (glycerol triacetate) may also increase F. prausnitzii abundance by providing acetate. Tributyrin (glycerol tributyrate) directly converts into butyrate and has additionally been found to increase butyrate-producing bacteria, though effect on F. prausnitzii specifically has not been reported. Riboflavin (vitamin B2) can enhance F. prausnitzii survival and abundance.

Existing probiotics do not contain F. prausnitzii, which is both due to viability problems as well as regulatory reasons, but some probiotics may nonetheless increase F. prausnitzii abundance via increased acetate and lactate production and hence bacterial cross-feeding. In addition, facultative anaerobes like Bacillus coagulans can profoundly increase gut F. prausnitzii abundance in the elderly by depleting oxygen. As of 2021, there has been very little research into the role of short chain fatty acid (SCFA)-producing bacteria and potential therapeutic benefits in inflammatory bowel disease. However, F. prausnitzii supplementation is now being studied in clinical trials for certain indications. There are challenges to F. prausnitzii manufacturing and administration due to its oxygen sensitivity among other issues. The first clinical study of F. prausnitzii supplementation in humans, which was specifically for treatment of Crohn's disease, was published in 2026.

Various medications have been found to increase or reverse depletion of F. prausnitzii concentrations, such as the antibiotic rifaximin, interferon α-2b, high-dose hydrocortisone, and the TNF inhibitor infliximab. Another means of increasing F. prausnitzii abundance is fecal microbiota transplant (FMT). Antibiotics such as amoxicillin and ciprofloxacin have been found to decrease Faecalibacterium species, whereas nitrofurantoin increased them.

== History ==
F. prausnitzii was discovered by C. Prausnitz in 1922. It was initially classified as Bacteroides prausnitzii in 1937 by P. Hauduroy and colleagues. Subsequently, the bacteria was reclassified as Fusobacterium prausnitzii in 1974. In 1996 however, genetic analysis revealed that F. prausnitzii is only distantly related to Fusobacterium. Later, a new genus called Faecalibacterium was proposed and the species was renamed to Faecalibacterium prausnitzii in 2002. Relatedly, F. prausnitzii was the first member of Faecalibacterium to be discovered. The first complete genome of F. prausnitzii was sequenced in 2010 in the frame of the Human Microbiome Project. F. prausnitzii has received very little scientific attention until around the 2010s, probably in part due to its extreme oxygen sensitivity and cultivation difficulties.
