= Larazotide =

Chemical compound

Legal status
- Legal status: Investigational

Identifiers
- IUPAC name: 2-[[(2S)-1-[(2S)-5-amino-2-[[(2S)-2-[[(2S)-2-[[(2S)-2-[[2-[(2-Aminoacetyl)amino]acetyl]amino]-3-methylbutanoyl]amino]-4-methylpentanoyl]amino]-3-methylbutanoyl]amino]-5-oxopentanoyl]pyrrolidine-2-carbonyl]amino]acetic acid
- CAS Number: 258818-34-7 881851-50-9 (acetate)
- PubChem CID: 9810532
- ChemSpider: 7986288
- UNII: ZN3R5560ZV
- KEGG: D09351
- CompTox Dashboard (EPA): DTXSID30180526

Chemical and physical data
- Formula: C_{32}H_{55}N_{9}O_{10}
- Molar mass: 725.845 g·mol^{−1}
- 3D model (JSmol): Interactive image
- SMILES: CC(C)C[C@@H](C(=O)N[C@@H](C(C)C)C(=O)N[C@@H](CCC(=O)N)C(=O)N1CCC[C@H]1C(=O)NCC(=O)O)NC(=O)[C@H](C(C)C)NC(=O)CNC(=O)CN
- InChI: InChI=1S/C32H55N9O10/c1-16(2)12-20(38-30(49)26(17(3)4)39-24(44)14-35-23(43)13-33)28(47)40-27(18(5)6)31(50)37-19(9-10-22(34)42)32(51)41-11-7-8-21(41)29(48)36-15-25(45)46/h16-21,26-27H,7-15,33H2,1-6H3,(H2,34,42)(H,35,43)(H,36,48)(H,37,50)(H,38,49)(H,39,44)(H,40,47)(H,45,46)/t19-,20-,21-,26-,27-/m0/s1; Key:ORFLZNAGUTZRLQ-ZMBVWFSWSA-N

Larazotide (INN; also known as AT-1001; formulated as the salt with acetic acid, larazotide acetate) is a synthetic eight amino acid peptide that functions as a tight junction regulator and reverses leaky junctions to their normally closed state. It has been studied in people with coeliac disease.

== Structure ==
Larazotide is a synthetic octapeptide derived from research on an enterotoxin secreted by Vibrio cholerae, the causative agent of cholera. It has the amino acid sequence GGVLVQPG, IUPAC condensed descriptor of H-Gly-Gly-Val-Leu-Val-Gln-Pro-Gly-OH, and the systematic name glycylglycyl-L-valyl-L-leucyl-L-valyl-L-glutaminyl-L-prolyl-glycine.

== Mechanism of action ==
Larazotide is an inhibitor of paracellular permeability. In celiac disease, one pathway that allows fragments of gliadin protein to get past the intestinal epithelium and subsequently trigger an immune response begins with binding of indigestible gliadin fragments to the chemokine CXC motif receptor 3 (CXCR3) on the luminal side of the intestinal epithelium (see this page). This leads to the induction of myeloid differentiation factor 88 (MYD88) and the release of zonulin into the lumen. Zonulin then binds to epidermal growth factor receptor (EGFR) and protease-activated receptor 2 (PAR2) in the intestinal epithelium. This complex then initiates a signalling pathway that eventually results in tight junction disassembly and increased intestinal permeability. Larazotide acetate intervenes in the middle of this pathway by blocking zonulin receptors, thereby preventing tight junction disassembly and associated increase in intestinal permeability.

== Origin ==
Larazotide acetate is a synthetic peptide based on a Vibrio cholerae enterotoxin called zonula occludens toxin that decreases intestinal permeability. An investigation was carried out to discover which specific part of this toxin was responsible for this activity. Several mutants were constructed, and tested for their biological activity and their ability to bind to intestinal epithelial cells in culture. The responsible region was located near the carboxyl terminus of the toxin protein. This region coincided with a peptide product generated by Vibrio cholerae. The eight amino acid sequence in this region was shared with zonulin, an endogenous protein involved in tight junction modulation. This sequence was later designated larazotide acetate.

== Research ==
It has been used in experiments related to coeliac disease and rheumatoid arthritis.

9 Meters Biopharma was conducting clinical trials for larazotide for Celiac Disease, but announced in 2022 that it would discontinue their Phase 3 clinical trial.
