= Carlo Catassi =

Professor Carlo Catassi
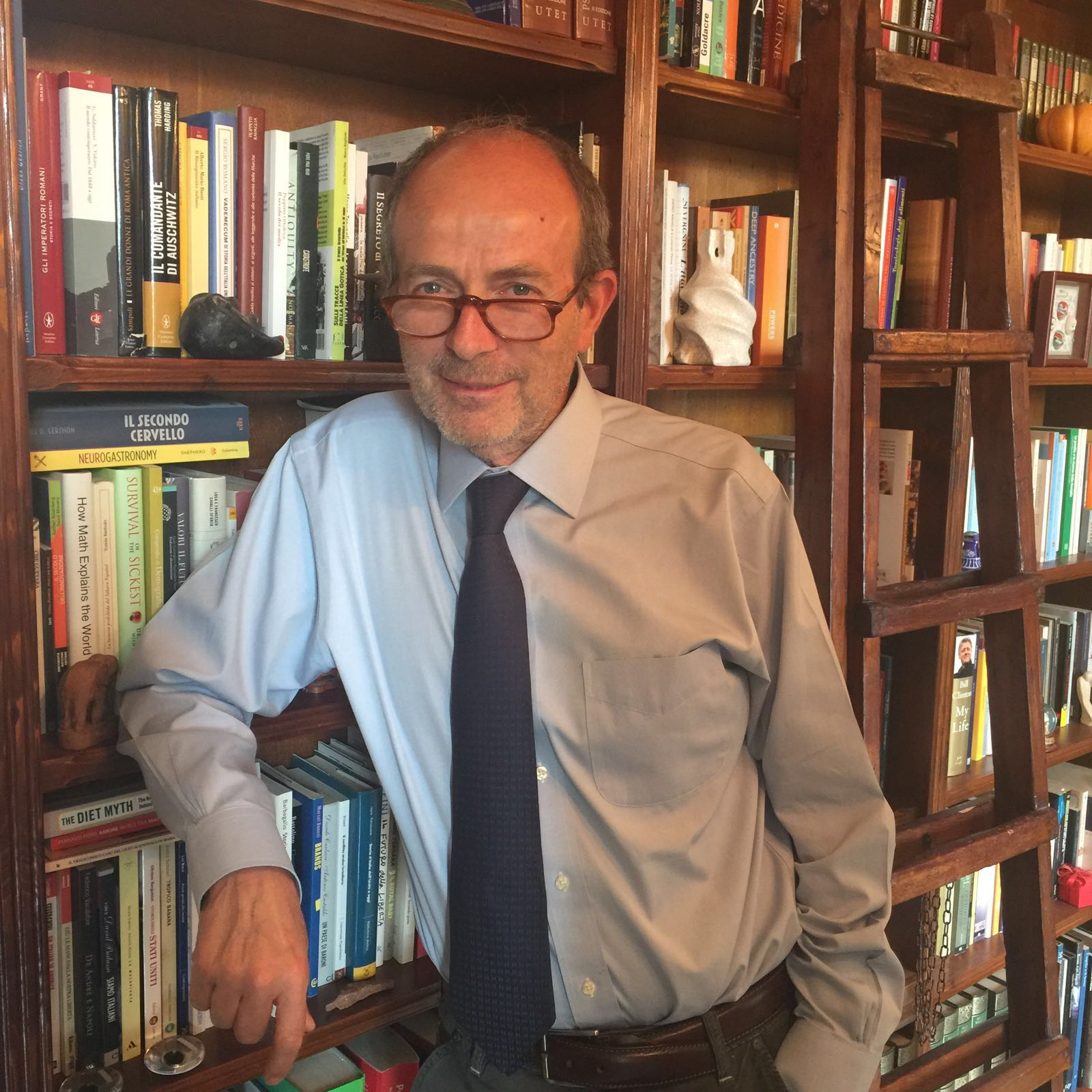
- Catassi in his personal library
- Born: April 19, 1953 (age 72); Livorno, Italy
- Occupations: Pediatric gastroenterologist, researcher
- Years active: 1980s–present
- Employer(s): Università Politecnica delle Marche, Massachusetts General Hospital
- Known for: Research on celiac disease and gluten-related disorders
- Notable work: Fast Facts: Celiac Disease
- Spouse: Dr. Eleonora Bove
- Children: 2

Carlo Catassi (born 19 April 1953) is an Italian pediatric gastroenterologist and epidemiologist. He is a professor at the Università Politecnica delle Marche in Ancona, Italy, where he leads the Department of Pediatrics and directs the Pediatric Residency Program. He is also a visiting scientist at Massachusetts General Hospital in Boston, United States.

== Career ==
Catassi has held a full professorship at the Università Politecnica delle Marche since 1993. From 2013 to 2016, he served as president of the Italian Society of Pediatric Gastroenterology, Hepatology and Nutrition (SIGENP).

In the 1990s, he coordinated a multicenter screening in Italy that helped shape the "celiac iceberg" model, illustrating how many individuals with celiac disease remain undiagnosed. He later led one of the first population-based screening studies in the United States, which estimated the disease affects roughly 1% of the population.

His research extended globally, including studies in Brazil and Middle Eastern populations, where he contributed to early data on disease prevalence.

== Research ==
Catassi’s research focuses on the epidemiology and clinical management of gluten-related disorders. He conducted one of the first clinical trials to determine how much gluten can safely be tolerated by individuals with celiac disease. These results helped set the international regulatory limit of 20 ppm for gluten-free products.

He has also examined high-prevalence populations, including the Saharawi people, among whom celiac disease rates were observed to be around 6%.

In collaboration with international experts, Catassi co-developed the Salerno criteria for diagnosing non-celiac gluten sensitivity (NCGS), aiming to improve diagnostic consistency.

His studies also examined environmental triggers of celiac disease in children, showing that neither the timing of gluten introduction nor breastfeeding significantly impacts disease risk.

== Selected publications ==
- Catassi C, et al. "Detection of Celiac Disease in Primary Care: A Multicenter Case-Finding Study in North America." The American Journal of Gastroenterology, 2007. doi:10.1111/j.1572-0241.2007.01173.x.
- Catassi C, et al. "A prospective, double-blind, placebo-controlled trial to establish a safe gluten threshold..." The American Journal of Clinical Nutrition, 2007. doi:10.1093/ajcn/85.1.160.
- Catassi C, et al. "Diagnosis of Non-Celiac Gluten Sensitivity (NCGS): The Salerno Experts' Criteria." Nutrients, 2015. doi:10.3390/nu7064966.

== Personal life ==
Catassi is married to Dr. Eleonora Bove, a lawyer. They have two children.
