= Intestinal mucosal barrier =

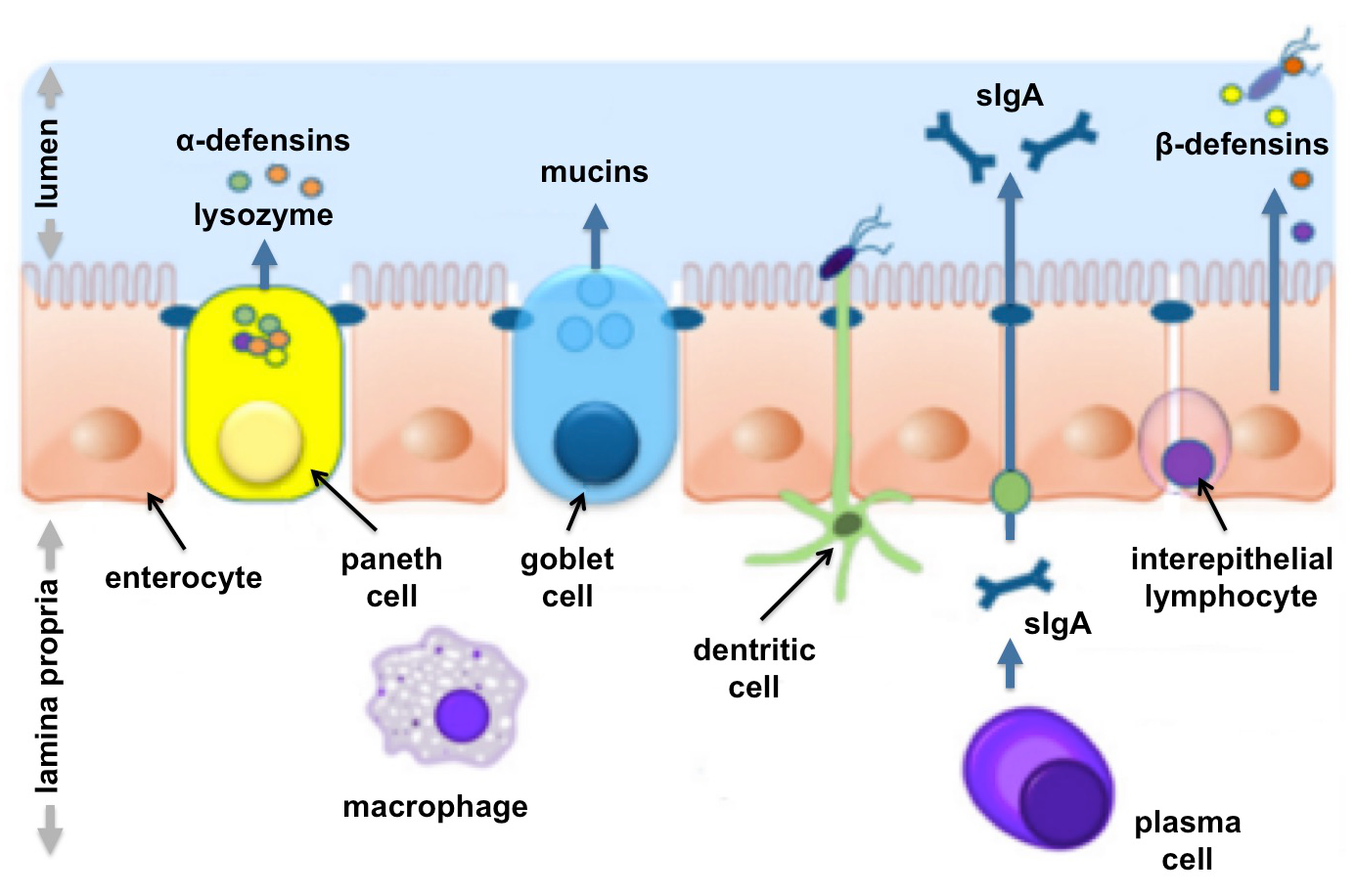
Physical, biochemical, and immune elements of the intestinal mucosal barrier.

The intestinal mucosal barrier, also referred to as intestinal barrier, refers to the property of the intestinal mucosa that ensures adequate containment of undesirable luminal contents within the intestine while preserving the ability to absorb nutrients. The separation it provides between the body and the gut prevents the uncontrolled translocation of luminal contents into the body proper. Its role in protecting the mucosal tissues and circulatory system from exposure to pro-inflammatory molecules, such as microorganisms, toxins, and antigens is vital for the maintenance of health and well-being. Intestinal mucosal barrier dysfunction has been implicated in numerous health conditions such as: food allergies, microbial infections, irritable bowel syndrome, inflammatory bowel disease, celiac disease, metabolic syndrome, metabolic dysfunction–associated steatotic liver disease, diabetes, and septic shock.

== Composition ==
The intestinal mucosal barrier is a heterogeneous entity composed of physical, biochemical, and immune elements elaborated by the intestinal mucosa. The central component is the intestinal epithelial layer, which provides physical separation between the lumen and the body. The secretion of various molecules into the lumen reinforces the barrier function on the extra-epithelial side, while a variety of immune cells provide additional protection below the epithelial layer.

=== Physical elements ===
==== Mucus layer(s) ====
Mucus forms a layer (or layers, in the case of the colon) that separates the bulk of the luminal contents from the intestinal epithelium. The mucus consists of a highly glycosylated hydrated gel formed by mucin molecules that are secreted by goblet cells. The mucus prevents large particles from contacting the epithelial cell layer while allowing small molecules to pass. The mucus also facilitates passage of the luminal contents along the length of the intestines, protects the epithelial cells from digestive enzymes, and prevents the direct contact of microorganisms with the epithelial layer.

==== The intestinal epithelium ====
The intestinal epithelium is the foremost component of the intestinal mucosal barrier. It consists of the layer of epithelial cells lining the intestine. Crucial for forming an effective barrier is the precise control of the paracellular pathway (a route for translocation of molecules between cells). Sealing of the space between adjacent cells is mediated by junctional complexes formed by protein connections elaborated by each individual cell. In addition to its protective function, the intestinal epithelium controls the selective uptake of beneficial ions, nutrients, and other substances from the lumen into the body.

==== Microbiota ====
The commensal microbial species that inhabit the gut are considered by some to be part of the intestinal mucosal barrier. The gut microbiota can influence barrier function both directly, by stimulating epithelial cell proliferation and secretion of IL-8, and indirectly by producing short-chain fatty acids, which are an important energy source for colonic epithelial cells (colonocytes).

=== Biochemical elements ===
==== Bile and gastric acid ====
The bile produced by the liver to aid in the digestion of lipids has bactericidal properties. The gastric acid produced by the stomach can also kill microorganisms. Both contribute to intestinal barrier function although they are not produced by the intestinal mucosa.

==== Defensins ====
Specialised secretory epithelial cells called Paneth cells secrete abundant quantities human α-defensins into the intestinal lumen of healthy individuals.

==== Lysozyme ====
Lysozyme is another defensive molecule secreted by Paneth cells into the lumen.

==== Regenerating islet-derived protein 3 gamma (Reg3γ) ====
Reg3γ is an antibacterial lectin secreted by Paneth cells that serves to prevent microorganisms from coming into contact with the epithelial layer.

=== Immunological elements ===
==== Antimicrobial peptides ====
Antimicrobial peptides (AMPs), which are a diverse array of molecules that kill bacteria and fungi, are secreted by Paneth cells into the lumen.

==== Secretory immunoglobulin A (sIgA ) ====
Secretory immunoglobulin A (sIgA) is produced by plasma cells in the lamina propria and transported into the lumen by intestinal epithelial cells. SIgA blocks epithelial-specific receptors on pathogens, thereby preventing their attachment to epithelial cells.

==== Cellular immunity ====
A variety of immune cells reside in the lamina propria which underlies the intestinal epithelium. These include dendritic cells (DCs), macrophages, intraepithelial lymphocytes (IEL), T regulatory cells (T Regs), TCD4+ lymphocytes, B lymphocytes, and plasma cells. This population provides immune protection that is characterised by the rapid detection and killing of microorganisms that penetrate the intestinal epithelium.

== Physiology ==
Intestinal barrier integrity is malleable and multiple mechanisms have been shown to be capable of modulating intestinal permeability (a measure of intestinal barrier function). Modulating factors include cytokines, immune cells, and exogenous factors.

=== Measurement ===
Intestinal permeability is a measurement of intestinal mucosal barrier function and is defined as "the facility with which intestinal epithelium allows molecules to pass through by non-mediated passive diffusion." Permeability in this respect is mostly related to the measurable passage of ions and small inert molecules. Standard methods for measurement include tissue electrical resistance for in vitro testing and passage of ingested inert molecules of specific molecular weights into the urine for in vivo testing. For example, in vivo testing using lactulose / mannitol consists of ingesting 5 g lactulose and 2 g mannitol followed by determination of urinary concentrations of lactulose and mannitol 5 hours after ingestion. The percentage lactulose excretion and the lactulose mannitol ratio in the urine are calculated and used as a measure of intestinal permeability.

=== Endogenous regulators ===
==== Cytokines ====
- Interferon-gamma (IFNγ)
- Tumor necrosis factor alpha (TNFα)
- Th2 helper cell effector cytokines interleukin 4 (IL4) and interleukin 13 (IL-13)
- Anti-inflammatory cytokine interleukin 10 (IL-10)
- Zonulin

==== Immune cells ====
- Gamma/delta-positive intestinal intraepithelial lymphocytes (iIELγδ+)
- Mast cells
- Eosinophils

=== Exogenous regulators ===
- Alcohol
- Nonsteroidal anti-inflammatory drugs (NSAIDs) can cause increased gastric acid secretion, diminished bicarbonate secretion, diminished mucus secretion and diminished trophic effects on epithelial mucosa by inhibiting COX-1, COX-2 and prostaglandins.
- Tacrolimus

==== Pathogens ====
- Enteropathogenic Escherichia coli (EPEC)
- Vibrio cholerae
- Clostridium perfringens
- Candida albicans

== Clinical significance ==
A disrupted intestinal mucosal barrier can allow passage of microbes, microbial products, and foreign antigens into the mucosa and the body proper. This can result in activation of the immune system and secretion of inflammatory mediators. Certain immune responses might, in turn, cause cellular damage that could result in further barrier dysfunction. Defects in intestinal mucosal barrier function with the accompanying translocation of microbes and their products have been linked with a variety of conditions, some of which are thought to additionally require a genetic predisposition. Both intestinal and extra-intestinal autoimmune disorders can result. Intestinal barrier dysfunction is thought to be precondition for and exacerbating factor of numerous autoimmune and inflammatory conditions, including food allergies, inflammatory bowel diseases, celiac disease and diabetes.

=== Food allergies ===
Intestinal barrier dysfunction may be a critical factor for antigen sensitisations and the IgE/mast cell-mediated anaphylactic effector phase of food allergies. The development of food allergies depend on the antigen coming into contact with components of the mucosal immune system. This leads to antigen sensitisation and dietary antigen-specific CD4+ Th2 cell and IgE production. The hypothesis is that intestinal barrier dysfunction allows dietary antigens to cross the intestinal barrier, come into contact with the mucosal immune system, and trigger an antigen-specific immune response.

Reduced intestinal barrier function correlates with the severity of symptoms experienced by food allergy sufferers. Oral challenge with the implicated allergen results in an increased lactulose/mannitol ratio in the urine (a measure of intestinal permeability).

=== Inflammatory bowel disease ===
An emerging model of inflammatory bowel disease (IBD) pathogenesis postulates three prerequisite factors: 1) degradation of intestinal barrier function, 2) translocation of luminal contents into the lamina propria and subsequent exposure to immune cells, and 3) an inappropriate immune response. Although intestinal barrier dysfunction is clearly implicated in the development of inflammatory bowel disease, it is unclear what initiates the self-perpetuating cycle that leads to disease exacerbation. Nevertheless, there is a growing body of evidence that implicates increased intestinal permeability as a primary etiologic factor of inflammatory bowel disease pathogenesis.

=== Celiac disease ===
Altered intestinal barrier function may play a role in the development of celiac disease. By allowing gliadin, the causative agent of celiac disease, to cross the intestinal barrier, inappropriate activation of the immune system can occur. Celiac disease sufferers have been shown to have elevated intestinal permeability and altered tight junctions. Moreover, these disruptions persist in patients who successfully maintain a gluten-free diet. Data also exist demonstrating that increased intestinal permeability is present prior to onset of celiac disease.

=== Type 1 diabetes ===
A combination of genetics, dysregulated intestinal barrier function, and inappropriate immune responses has been hypothesised to play a role in type 1 diabetes. Elevated intestinal permeability has been reported observed in patients at disease onset. The resulting increase in exposure to antigens can trigger autoimmune destruction of beta cells in the pancreas.

=== Other conditions ===
Defects in intestinal mucosal barrier function have also been implicated in irritable bowel syndrome, metabolic syndrome, metabolic dysfunction–associated steatotic liver disease, and septic shock.

=== Stress ===
Psychological and physical stress can induce a variety of alterations in intestinal function. These include changes in gut motility, intestinal permeability, ion flux, fluid balance and mucus secretion. Furthermore, acute and chronic stress in animal models has shown that stress can cause degradation of intestinal barrier function. Psychological stress can influence the clinical outcome of inflammatory bowel disease and irritable bowel syndrome. Long-term stress has been shown to be positively associated with an increased propensity for relapse of ulcerative colitis.

== History ==
Cummings adopted the term mucosal barrier in 2004 to describe the "complex structure that separates the internal milieu from the luminal environment." More recently, intestinal barrier has been used by gastroenterologists, immunologists and microbiologists to emphasise the component of the intestine that protects the body from microorganisms and their toxins.

== See also ==
- Antimicrobial peptides
- Immunoglobulin A
- Intestinal epithelium
- Intestinal permeability
- Human gastrointestinal tract
- Gastric mucosal barrier
- Gastrointestinal physiology
- Gut (anatomy)
- Mucosa-associated lymphoid tissue
- Mucin
