= Intestinal permeability =

Medical term

Intestinal permeability is a term describing the control of material passing from inside the gastrointestinal tract through the cells lining the gut wall, into the rest of the body. The intestine normally exhibits some permeability, which allows nutrients to pass through the gut, while also maintaining a barrier function to keep potentially harmful substances (such as antigens) from leaving the intestine and migrating to the body more widely. In a healthy human intestine, small particles (< 4 Å in radius) can migrate through tight junction claudin pore pathways, and particles up to 10–15 Å (3.5 kDa) can transit through the paracellular space uptake route. There is some evidence abnormally increased intestinal permeability may play a role in some chronic diseases and inflammatory conditions. The most well understood condition with observed increased intestinal permeability is celiac disease.

== Physiology ==
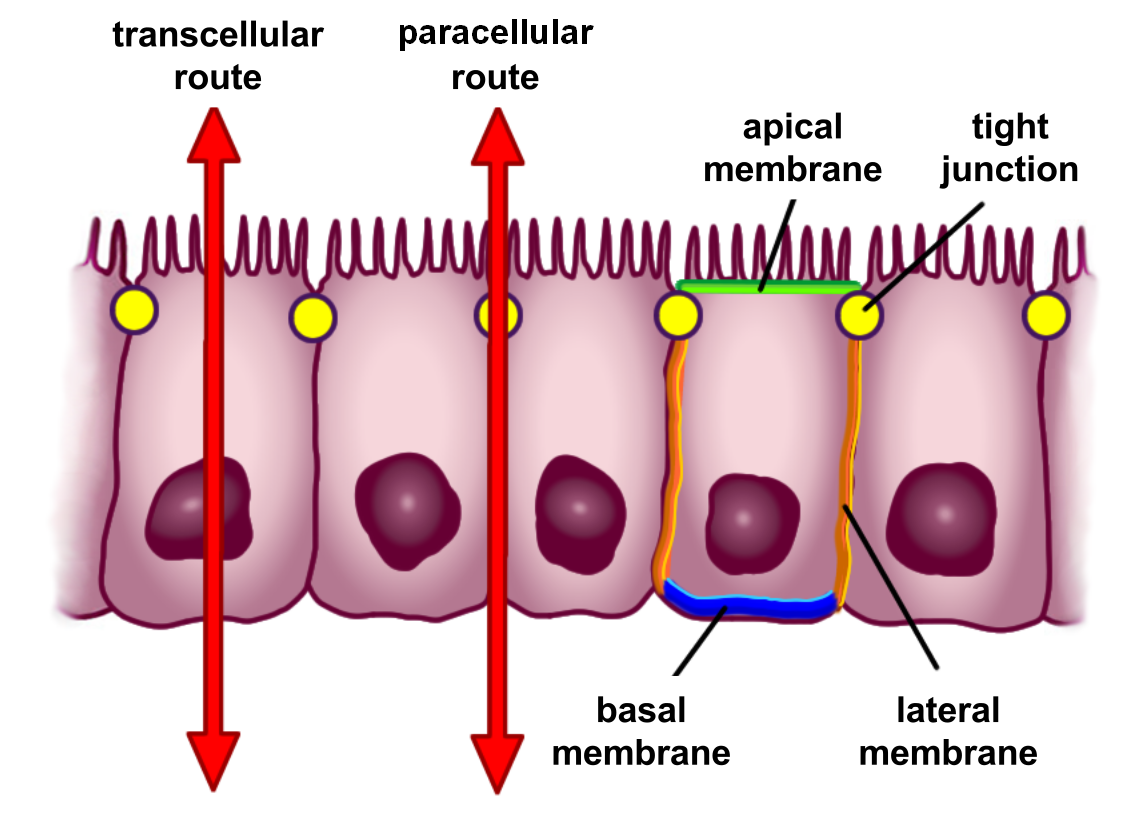
Scheme of selective permeability routes of epithelial cells (red arrows). The transcellular (through the cells) and paracellular (between the cells) routes control the passage of substances between the intestinal lumen and blood.

The barrier formed by the intestinal epithelium separates the external environment (the contents of the intestinal lumen) from the body and is the most extensive and important mucosal surface of the body. However, the intestinal mucin can also be barriers for the host antimicrobial peptides, thus plays a bidirectional barrier for host-microbial interaction. The intestinal epithelium is composed of a single layer of cells and serves two crucial functions. First, it acts as a barrier, preventing the entry of harmful substances such as foreign antigens, toxins and microorganisms. Second, it acts as a selective filter which facilitates the uptake of dietary nutrients, electrolytes, water and various other beneficial substances from the intestinal lumen. Selective permeability is mediated via two major routes:

- Transepithelial or transcellular permeability. This consists of specific transport of solutes across the epithelial cells. It is predominantly regulated by the activities of specialised transporters that translocate specific electrolytes, amino acids, sugars, short chain fatty acids and other molecules into or out of the cell. Specialized cells in the intestinal epithelium called microfold cells (M cells) will sample bacteria and their antigens in the gut lumen, which bind to apical receptors on the M cell and are subsequently engulfed and undergo transcytosis across the M cells' basolateral membrane. M cells are associated with subepithelial Peyer's patches, which consist of immune cell aggregates that may recognize and react to the transcytosed antigens. Typically this promotes intestinal homeostasis, but certain bacterial pathogens, such as Salmonella typhimurium, can induce intestinal epithelial cells to transform into M cells, which may be a mechanism that aids bacterial invasion of the body.
- Paracellular permeability. It depends on transport through the spaces that exist between epithelial cells. It is regulated by cellular junctions that are localized in the laminal membranes of the cells. This is the main route of passive flow of water and solutes across the intestinal epithelium. Regulation depends on the intercellular tight junctions which have the most influence on paracellular transport. Disruption of the tight junction barrier can be a trigger for the development of intestinal diseases.

== Modulation ==
One way in which intestinal permeability is modulated is via CXCR3 receptors in cells in the intestinal epithelium, which respond to zonulin.

Gliadin (a glycoprotein present in wheat) activates zonulin signaling in all people who eat gluten, irrespective of the genetic expression of autoimmunity. This leads to increased intestinal permeability to macromolecules. Bacterial infections such as cholera, select enteric viruses, parasites, and stress can all modulate intestinal tight junction structure and function, and these effects may contribute to the development of chronic intestinal disorders. So called absorption modifying excipients, investigated for the possibility of increasing intestinal drug absorption, can increase the gut permeability.

== Clinical significance ==
Most people do not experience adverse symptoms, but the opening of intercellular tight junctions (increased intestinal permeability) can act as a trigger for diseases that can affect any organ or tissue depending on genetic predisposition.

Increased intestinal permeability is a factor in several diseases, such as celiac disease, irritable bowel syndrome, type 1 diabetes, type 2 diabetes, rheumatoid arthritis, spondyloarthropathies, inflammatory bowel disease, schizophrenia, certain types of cancer, obesity, fatty liver, atopy and allergic diseases, among others. In the majority of cases, increased permeability develops prior to disease, but the cause–effect relationship between increased intestinal permeability in most of these diseases is not clear.

A well studied model is celiac disease, in which increased intestinal permeability appears secondary to the abnormal immune reaction induced by gluten and allows fragments of gliadin protein to get past the intestinal epithelium, triggering an immune response at the intestinal submucosa level that leads to diverse gastrointestinal or extra-gastrointestinal symptoms. Other environmental triggers may contribute to alter permeability in celiac disease, including intestinal infections and iron deficiency. Once established, this increase of permeability might self-sustain the inflammatory immune responses and perpetuate a vicious cycle. Eliminating gluten from the diet leads to normalization of intestinal permeability and the autoimmune process shuts off.

== Research directions ==
In normal physiology, glutamine plays a key role in signalling in enterocytes that are part of the intestinal barrier, but it is not clear if supplementing the diet with glutamine is helpful in conditions where there is increased intestinal permeability.

Prebiotics and certain probiotics such as E. coli strain Nissle 1917 have been found to reduce increased intestinal permeability. Lactobacillus rhamnosus, Lactobacillus reuteri, and Faecalibacterium prausnitzii have also been shown to significantly reduce increased intestinal permeability.

Larazotide acetate (previously known as AT-1001) is a zonulin receptor antagonist that has been probed in clinical trials. It seems to be a drug candidate for use in conjunction with a gluten-free diet in people with celiac disease, with the aim to reduce the intestinal permeability caused by gluten and its passage through the epithelium, and therefore mitigating the resulting cascade of immune reactions.

Genetic disruption of arginase-2 in mouse attenuates the onset of senescence and extends lifespan. Arginase inhibitors have been developed to reduce the effect of NO on intestinal permeability.

== Leaky gut syndrome ==
"Leaky gut syndrome" is a hypothetical, medically unrecognized condition. It has been popularized by some nutritionists and practitioners of alternative medicine who claim that restoring normal functioning of the gut wall can cure many systemic health conditions. However, reliable source evidence to support this claim has not been published. Nor has there been published any reliable evidence that the treatments promoted for so-called "leaky gut syndrome"—including nutritional supplements, probiotics, herbal remedies, (or low-FODMAP diets; low-sugar, antifungal, or gluten-free diets)—have any beneficial effect for most of the conditions they are claimed to help.

== Exercise-induced stress ==
Exercise-induced stress can diminish intestinal barrier function. In humans, the level of physical activity modulates the gastrointestinal microbiota, an increased intensity and volume of exercise may lead to gut dysbiosis, and supplementation may keep gut microbiota in biodiversity, especially with intense exercise. In mice, exercise reduced the richness of the microbial community, but increased the distribution of bacterial communities.

== See also ==
- Environmental enteropathy
- Intestinal mucosal barrier
- Visceral hypersensitivity
