= Zonulin =

Protein

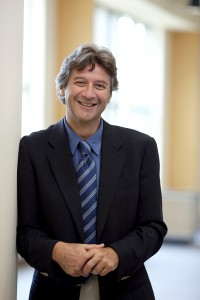
Alessio Fasano

Zonulin is a family of structurally and functionally related proteins (zonulin family proteins, ZPS) that regulate epithelial and endothelial barrier permeability by modulating intercellular tight junctions. The zonulin system controls the trafficking of antigens, microorganisms, and other macromolecules across mucosal and vascular barriers, thereby contributing to the maintenance of immune homeostasis and host-environment interactions.

The first member of the ZFPs was identified as pre-habtoglobin (pre-HP2), the uncleaved precursor of haptoglobin 2. Later studies demonstrated that zonulin is not a single molecule but rather a family of proteins sharing structural homology and permeability-regulating activity. Members of the zonulin family belong to or are related to the mannose-associated serine protease (MASP) superfamily.

== Function ==
The primary function of the zonulin system, the first-discovered physiologic modulatory system of epithelial and endothelial barriers, is the reversible regulation of paracellular permeability through the disassembly and reorganization of tight junction complexes. Tight junctions are multi-protein structures located at the apical region of epithelial and endothelial cells that regulate the movement of solutes and antigens between adjacent cells.

Physiological zonulin signaling allows controlled antigen trafficking across barrier surfaces, a process thought to contribute to immune surveillance/homeostasis and innate defense. Temporary increases in permeability may facilitate the clearance of luminal microorganisms and permit regulated interactions between the immune system and environmental antigens.

Excessive or sustained activation of the zonulin pathway can lead to increased barrier permeability and enhanced translocation of luminal antigens, microbial products, and inflammatory mediators into underlying tissues and the circulatory system.

== Discovery ==
Zonulin was first identified as a human analogue of the vibrio cholerae zonula occludens toxin (Zot), a bacterial protein capable of reversibly opening tight junctions in 2000. Initial studies characterized zonulin as an endogenous mediator of intestinal permeability.

In 2009, proteomic analyses identified human zonulin as pre-haptoglobin-2 (pre-HP2), demonstrating that the biologically active precursor possesses permeability-regulating functions distinct from those of mature haptoglobin.

Subsequent research expanded the concept of zonulin from a single protein to a broader family of permeability-regulating proteins. Properdin was recognized as an additional member of the zonulin family, and further studies suggested that coagulation factor X (FX) and CD5 antigen-like protein (CD5L) may also belong to this group based on structural and functional similarities.

== Zonulin family proteins ==
The term zonulin family proteins (ZFPs) refers to a group of structurally related molecules that share the ability to modulate barrier function and antigen trafficking. Current and proposed members include:

- Prehaptoglobin-2 (pre-HP2)
- Properdin (factor P)
- Coagulation factor X (proposed)
- CD5 antigen-like protein (CD5L) (proposed)

Because multiple proteins may exhibit zonulin-like activity and immunological cross-reactivity, the term "zonulin" is increasingly used to describe a functional family rather than a singular molecular entity.

== Mechanism of action ==
Zonulin signaling induces tight junction disassembly through activation of cell-surface signaling pathways involving protease-activated receptor 2 (PAR2) and epidermal growth factor receptor (EGFR). These signaling events lead to cytoskeletal rearrangement and redistribution of tight junction proteins, resulting in increased paracellular permeability.

Known triggers of zonulin release include intestinal dysbiosis (changes in composition and function of gut microbiota) and gliadin, a component of gluten. Zonulin release in response to these stimuli is considered part of a physiological mechanism regulating host-microbe and host-environment interactions.

== Clinical significance ==
Dysregulation of the zonulin pathway has been associated with increased intestinal permeability and has been investigated in several chronic inflammatory and immune-mediated disorders, including:

- Celiac disease
- Type 1 diabetes mellitus
- Autoimmune diseases
- Metabolic disorders
- Neurological and neuroinflammatory conditions

The proposed mechanism involves excessive antigen trafficking across compromised epithelial barriers, potentially promoting aberrant immune activation in genetically susceptible individuals.

== Biomarker controversies ==
The use of zonulin as a biomarker of intestinal permeability remains controversial. Multiple studies have reported that commonly used commercial enzyme-linked immunosorbent assays {ELISAs) may detect proteins other than prehaptoglobin-2, raising concerns about assay specificity and interpretation of circulating "zonulin" measurements.

These findings have contributed to a shift in terminology toward the concept of Zonulin Family Proteins, ZFPs, reflecting the possibility that several structurally related permeability-regulating proteins may be measured by currently available assays.

== Therapeutic targeting ==
Pharmacological inhibition of zonulin signaling has been investigated as a strategy to restore barrier integrity. Larazotide acetate (formerly AT-1001), a zonulin pathway inhibitor, has been studied in clinical trials for disorders characterized by increased intestinal permeability, particularly celiac disease.

== See also ==
- Intestinal permeability
- Tight junction
- Haptoglobin
- Properdin
- Larazotide acetate
- Celiac disease
- Epithelial barrier function
- Leaky gut syndrome
- Claudin
- Occludin
