= Intestinal epithelium =

Single-cell layer lining the intestines

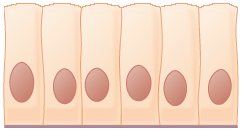
- Simple columnar epithelial cells

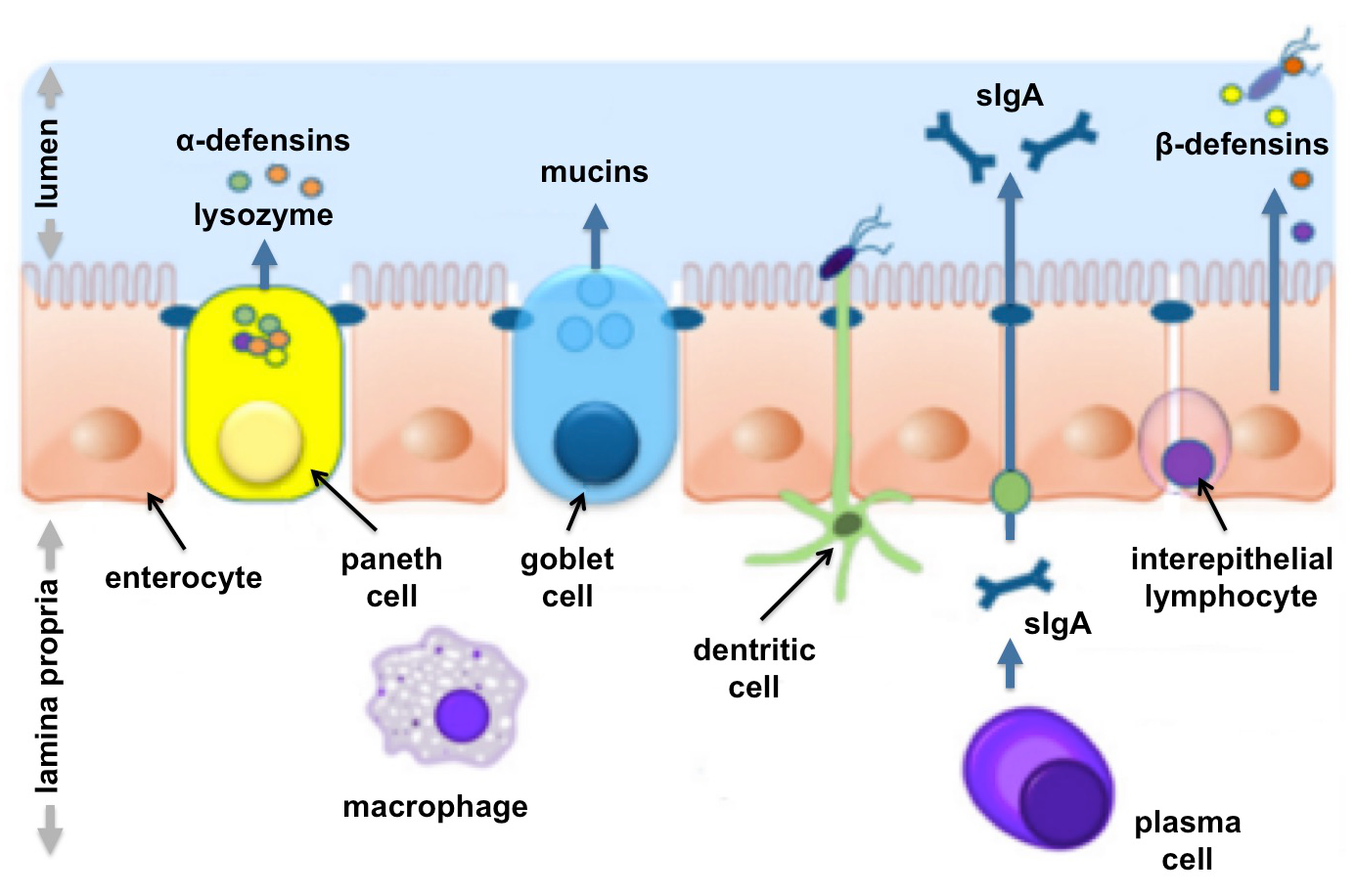
- Cell types of the intestinal epithelium

Identifiers
- MeSH: D007413
- FMA: 15695 17229, 15695

The intestinal epithelium is the single cell layer that forms the luminal surface (lining) of both the small and large intestine (colon) of the gastrointestinal tract. Composed of simple columnar epithelium its main functions are absorption, and secretion. Useful substances are absorbed into the body, and the entry of harmful substances is restricted. Secretions include mucins, and peptides.

Absorptive cells in the small intestine are known as enterocytes, and in the colon they are known as colonocytes. The other cell types are the secretory cells – goblet cells, Paneth cells, enteroendocrine cells, and Tuft cells. Paneth cells are absent in the colon.

As part of its protective role, the intestinal epithelium forms an important component of the intestinal mucosal barrier. Certain diseases and conditions are caused by functional defects in the intestinal epithelium. On the other hand, various diseases and conditions can lead to its dysfunction which, in turn, can lead to further complications.

== Structure ==
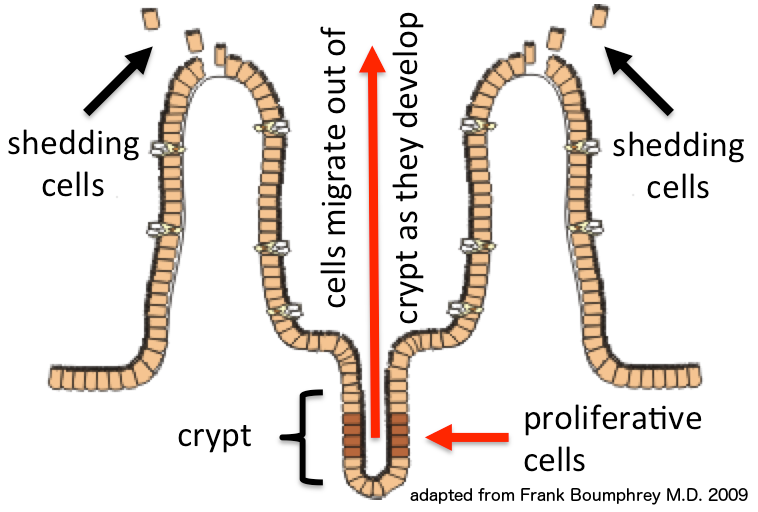
Proliferative stem cells residing at the base of the intestinal glands produce new epithelial cells which migrate upwards and out of the crypt. Eventually, they are shed into the intestinal lumen

The intestinal epithelium is part of the mucosal lining. The epithelium is simple cuboidal epithelium composed of a single layer of cells, while the other two layers of the mucosa, the lamina propria and the muscularis mucosae, support and communicate with the epithelial layer. To securely contain the contents of the intestinal lumen, the cells of the epithelial layer are joined together by tight junctions, thus forming a contiguous and relatively impermeable membrane.

Drawing showing the relationship between villi and microvilli of the small intestine. The luminal surface of the enterocytes have microvilli (1 micrometer long) while the cell layer itself is folded to form villi (0.5-1.6 millimeters long) and crypts. Both serve to increase the total absorption surface of the intestine.

Epithelial cells are continuously renewed every 4–5 days through a process of cell division, maturation, and migration. Renewal relies on proliferative cells (stem cells) that reside at the crypt (base) of the intestinal glands (epithelial invaginations into the underlying connective tissue). After being formed at the base, the new cells migrate upwards and out of the crypt, maturing along the way. Eventually, they undergo apoptosis and are shed off into the intestinal lumen. In this way, the lining of the intestine is constantly renewed while the number of cells making up the epithelial layer remains constant.

In the small intestine, the mucosal layer is specially adapted to provide a large surface area in order to maximize the absorption of nutrients. The expansion of the absorptive surface, 600 times beyond that of a simple cylindrical tube, is achieved by three anatomical features:

- Circular folds are transverse folds that slow the passage of the luminal contents and serve to expand the total surface area threefold.
- Villi and intestinal glands serve to increase the mucosal surface area tenfold. (Intestinal villus)
- Microvilli covering the apical surface of the enterocytes increase the absorptive surface twentyfold. These numerous microscopic (100 nanometers in diameter) finger-like projections form an undulated brush border.

The brush border on the apical surface of the epithelial cells is covered with glycocalyx, which is composed of oligosaccharides attached to membrane glycoproteins and glycolipids.

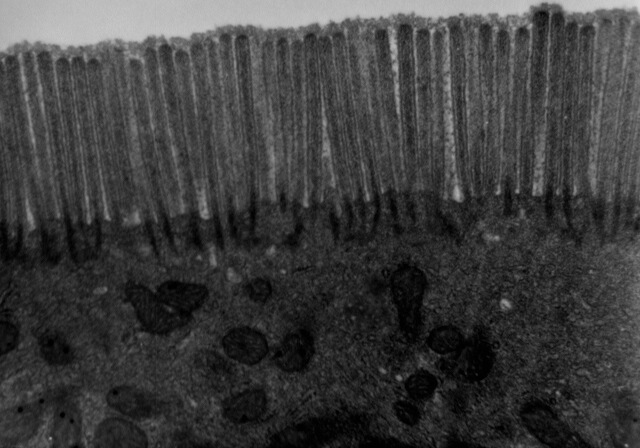
TEM image of a thin section cut through an epithelial cell showing the luminal surface (apical end) of the cell packed with microvilli that make up the absorbing surface. Each microvillus is approximately 1 micrometers long and 0.1 micrometer in diameter

=== Cell types ===
Different cell types are produced by the stem cells that reside at the base of the crypts. Each type matures according to its specific differentiation program as it migrates up and out of the crypt. Many of the genes necessary for differentiation into the different epithelial cell types have been identified and characterized. The cell types produced are: enterocytes (small intestine) (known as colonocytes in colon), Goblet cells, enteroendocrine cells, Paneth cells, microfold cells, cup cells and tuft cells. Their functions are listed here:

- Enterocytes (in the small intestine) known as colonocytes in the colon, are the most numerous and function primarily for nutrient digestion and absorption. Enterocytes express many catabolic enzymes on their exterior luminal surface to break down molecules to sizes appropriate for uptake into the cell. Examples of molecules taken up by enterocytes are: ions, water, simple sugars, vitamins, lipids, peptides and amino acids.
- Goblet cells secrete the mucus layer which protects the epithelium from the luminal contents.
- Enteroendocrine cells secrete various gastrointestinal hormones including secretin, pancreozymin (also called cholecystokinin or CCK), enteroglucagons (GLP-1 and GLP-2),serotonin, among others. Subsets of sensory intestinal epithelial cells synapse with nerves, and are known as neuropod cells.
- Paneth cells produce antimicrobial peptides such as human alpha-defensin.
- Microfold cells (commonly referred to as M cells) sample antigens from the lumen and deliver them to the lymphoid tissue associated with the mucosa (MALT). In the small intestine, M cells are associated with Peyer's patches.
- Cup cells are a distinct cell type that produces vimentin.
- Tuft cells play a part in the immune response.

Throughout the digestive tract, the distribution of the different types of epithelial cells varies according to the function of that region.

=== Structural components of cellular junctions ===
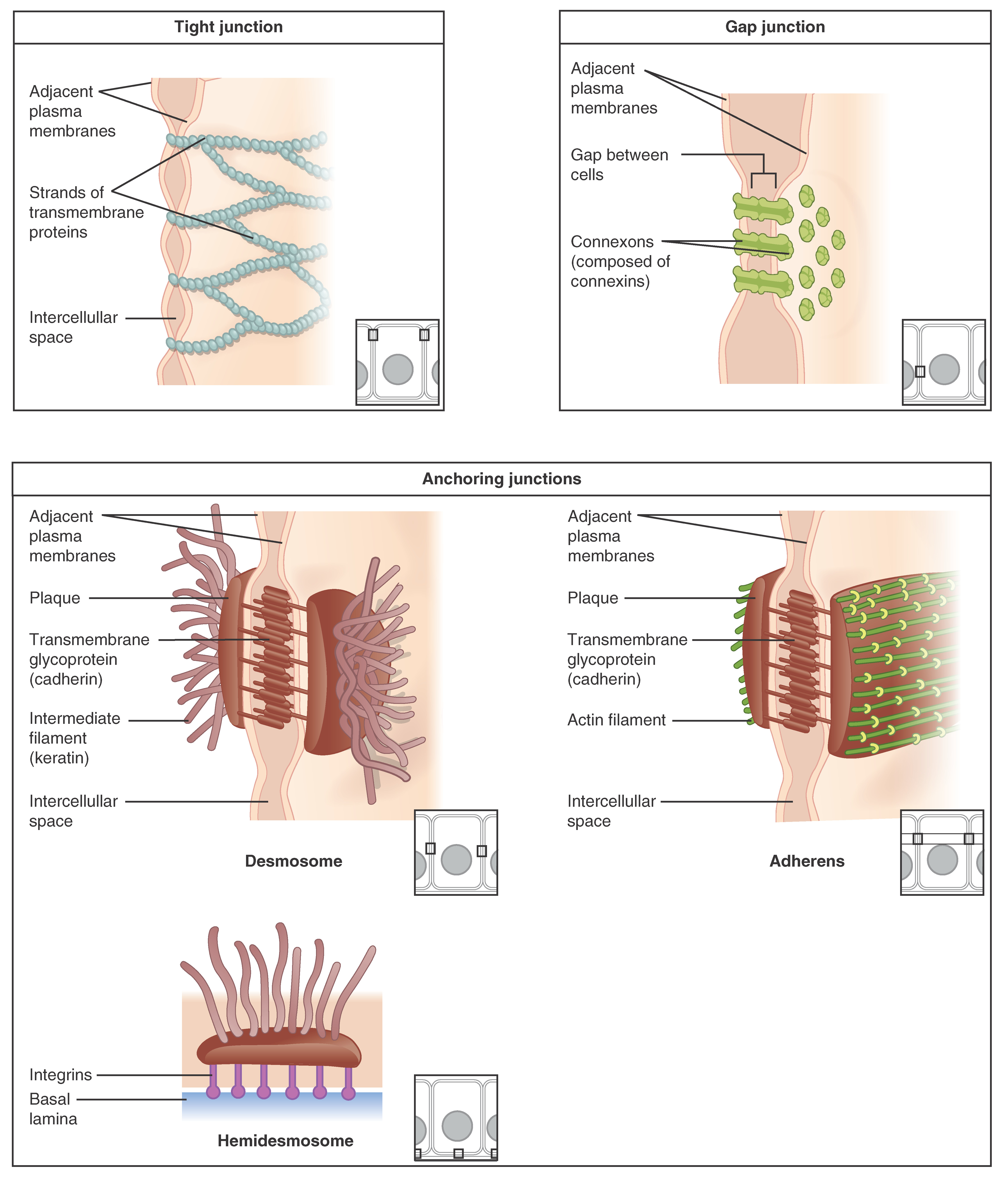
Types of cell junctions (click to enlarge).

Important for the barrier function of intestinal epithelium, its cells are joined securely together by four types of cell junction which can be identified at the ultrastructural level:

- Gap junctions
- Desmosomes
- Adherens junctions
- Tight junctions

==== Gap junctions ====
Gap junctions bring the adjacent cells within 2 nanometers of each other. They are formed by several homologous proteins encoded by the connexin gene family coming together to form a multiprotein complex. The molecular structure of this complex is in the form of a hexamer. The complex, which is embedded in the cell membranes of the two joined cells, forms a gap or channel in the middle of the six proteins. This channel allows various molecules, ions and electrical impulses to pass between the two cells.

==== Desmosomes ====
These complexes, consisting of transmembrane adhesion proteins of the cadherin family, link adjacent cells together through their cytoskeletons. Desmosomes leave a gap of 30 nanometers between cells.

==== Adherens junctions ====
Adherens junctions, also called zonula adherens, are multiprotein complexes formed by proteins of the catenin and cadherin families. They are located in the membrane at the contact points between the cells. They are formed by interactions between intracellular adapter proteins, transmembrane proteins and the actin cytoskeletons of the cells . Besides their role in linking adjacent cells, these complexes are important for regulating epithelial migration, cell polarity, and the formation of other cell junction complexes.

==== Tight junctions ====
Tight junctions, also called zonula occludens, are the most important components of the intestinal epithelium for its barrier function. These complexes, formed primarily of members of the claudin and the occludin families, consist of about 35 different proteins, form a ring shaped continuous ribbon around the cells, and are located near the borders of the lateral and apical membranes.

The extracellular domains of the transmembrane proteins in adjacent cells cross connect to form a tight seal. These interactions include those between proteins in the same membrane ("cis") and proteins in adjacent cells ("trans"). In addition, interactions can be homophilic (between identical proteins) or heterophilic (between different proteins).

Similar to adherens junctions, the intracellular domains of tight junctions interact with different scaffold proteins, adapter proteins and signaling complexes to regulate cytoskeletal linking, cell polarity, cell signaling and vesical trafficking.

Tight junctions provide a narrow but modifiable seal between adjacent cells in the epithelial layer and thereby provide selective paracellular transport of solutes. While previously thought to be static structures, tight junctions are now known to be dynamic and can change the size of the opening between cells and thereby adapt to the different states of development, physiologies and pathologies. They function as a selective and semipermeable paracellular barrier between apical and basolateral compartments of the epithelial layer. They function to facilitate the passage of small ions and water-soluble solutes through the paracellular space while preventing the passage of luminal antigens, microorganisms and their toxins.

== Physiology ==
The intestinal epithelium has a complex anatomical structure which facilitates motility and coordinated digestive, absorptive, immunological and neuroendocrine functions.

The mucus secreted by goblet cells acts as a lubricant and protects the epithelial cell layer against irritation from mucosal contents.

Traditionally, crypt cells were considered primarily as secretory cells while enterocytes are considered principally absorptive. However, recent studies have challenged this classical functional partitioning and have shown that both the surface and crypt cells can perform both secretory and absorptive functions and that, in fact, these functions can occur simultaneously.

=== Nutrient uptake ===
Overlaying the brush border of the apical surface of the enterocytes is the glycocalyx, which is a loose network composed of the oligosaccharide side chains of integral membrane hydrolases and other enzymes essential for the digestion of proteins and carbohydrates. These glycoproteins, glycolipids, and enzymes catalyze the final digestive stages of luminal carbohydrates and proteins. The monosaccharides and amino acids thus produced are subsequently transported across the intestinal epithelium and eventually into the bloodstream.

The absorption of electrolytes and water is one of the most important functions of the digestive tract. Water absorption is passive and isotonic - depending on the speed and direction of solute flow. Other factors influencing fluid absorption are osmolarity and the specific intestinal region. Regulated selective permeability is performed through two major routes: the transcellular (transepithelial) route and the paracellular route.

=== Transcellular permeability ===
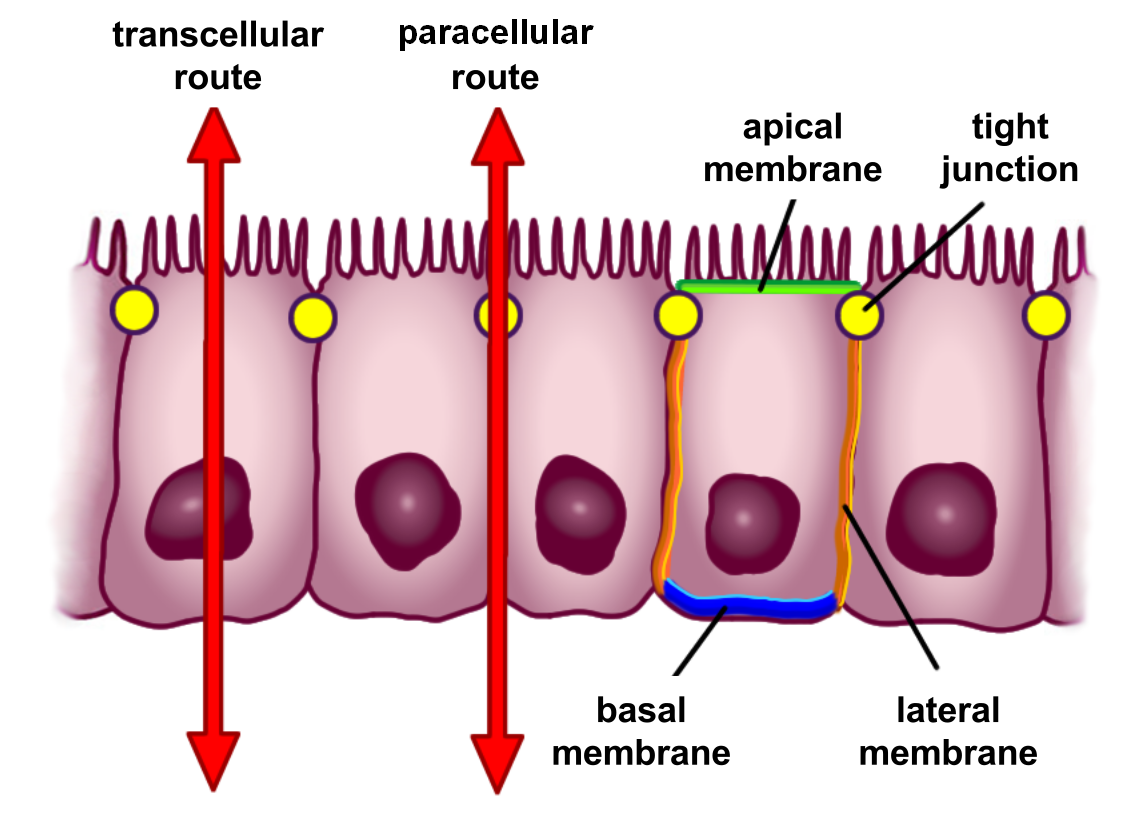
Scheme of selective permeability routes of epithelial cells (red arrows). The transcellular (through the cells) and paracellular (between the cells) routes control the passage of substances between the intestinal lumen and blood.

This consists of specific transport of solutes across the epithelial cells. It is predominantly regulated by the activities of specialised transporters that translocate specific electrolytes, amino acids, sugars, short chain fatty acids and other molecules into or out of the cell.

=== Paracellular permeability ===
Paracellular permeability depends on transport through the spaces that exist between epithelial cells. It is regulated by cellular junctions that are localized in the laminal membranes of the cells. This is the main route of passive flow of water and solutes across the intestinal epithelium. Regulation depends on the intercellular tight junctions which have the most influence on paracellular transport. Studies using the electron microscope showed that the electrical resistance of epithelial layers depends on the complexity and number of filaments within the tight junction transmembrane protein complexes. Also, the plasma membrane resistance and variable transmembrane conductance of the epithelial cells can also modulate paracellular pathway function.

== Functions ==
The barrier formed by the intestinal epithelium separates the external environment (the contents of the intestinal lumen) from the body and is the most extensive and important mucosal surface of body.

The intestinal epithelium serves several crucial functions, exhibiting both innate and adaptive immune features. It closely monitors its intracellular and extracellular environment, communicates messages to neighbouring cells and rapidly initiates active defensive and repair measures, if necessary. On the one hand, it acts as a barrier, preventing the entry of harmful substances such as foreign antigens, toxins and microorganisms. On the other hand, it acts as a selective filter which facilitates the uptake of dietary nutrients, electrolytes, water and various other beneficial substances from the intestinal lumen.

When barrier integrity is lost, intestinal permeability increases and uncontrolled passage of harmful substances can occur. This can lead to, depending on the genetic predisposition of the individual, the development of inflammation, infection, allergies, autoimmune diseases or cancer - within the intestine itself or other organs.

Although they primarily function as part of the digestive system, enterocytes of the intestinal epithelium also express toll-like receptors and nucleotide oligomerization domain proteins that recognize diverse types of microbes and contribute to immune system function. Thus the intestinal epithelium not only serves as a physical barrier separating the intestinal lumen from the body proper but also carries out pathogen recognition functions as part of the intrinsic immune system.

== Importance for human health ==
Loss of integrity of the intestinal epithelium plays a key pathogenic role in inflammatory bowel disease (IBD). Changes in the composition of the intestinal microbiota are an important environmental factor in the development of IBD. Detrimental changes in the intestinal microbiota induce an inappropriate (uncontrolled) immune response that results in damage to the intestinal epithelium. Breaches in this critical barrier (the intestinal epithelium) allow further infiltration of microbiota that, in turn, elicit further immune responses. IBD is a multifactorial disease that is nonetheless driven in part by an exaggerated immune response to gut microbiota that causes defects in epithelial barrier function.

Bile acids are normal components of the luminal contents of the gastrointestinal tract where they can act as physiologic detergents and regulators of intestinal epithelial homeostasis. Excessive long term exposure of intestinal epithelial cells to bile acids may cause oxidative stress leading to oxidative DNA damage and carcinogenic mutation.

== See also ==
- Intestinal mucosal barrier
- Intestinal permeability
