= Short-chain fatty acid =

Fatty acid with fewer than six carbon atoms

Short-chain fatty acids (SCFAs) are fatty acids of two to six carbon atoms. Derived from intestinal microbial fermentation of indigestible foods, SCFAs in human gut are acetic, propionic and butyric acid. Butyrate is the main energy source of colonocytes, making them crucial to gastrointestinal health. SCFAs all possess varying degrees of water solubility, which distinguishes them from longer chain fatty acids that are immiscible.

== List of SCFAs ==
Lipid number	Name		Salt/Ester Name		Formula		Mass (g/mol)	Diagram
Lipid number	Common	Systematic	Common	Systematic	Molecular	Structural	Mass (g/mol)	Diagram
C2:0	Acetic acid	Ethanoic acid	Acetate	Ethanoate	C_{2}H_{4}O_{2}	CH_{3}COOH	60.05	
C3:0	Propionic acid	Propanoic acid	Propionate	Propanoate	C_{3}H_{6}O_{2}	CH_{3}CH_{2}COOH	74.08	
C4:0	Butyric acid	Butanoic acid	Butyrate	Butanoate	C_{4}H_{8}O_{2}	CH_{3}(CH_{2})_{2}COOH	88.11	
C4:0	Isobutyric acid	2-Methylpropanoic acid	Isobutyrate	2-Methylpropanoate	C_{4}H_{8}O_{2}	(CH_{3})_{2}CHCOOH	88.11	
C5:0	Valeric acid	Pentanoic acid	Valerate	Pentanoate	C_{5}H_{10}O_{2}	CH_{3}(CH_{2})_{3}COOH	102.13	
C5:0	Isovaleric acid	3-Methylbutanoic acid	Isovalerate	3-Methylbutanoate	C_{5}H_{10}O_{2}	(CH_{3})_{2}CHCH_{2}COOH	102.13	
C5:0	2-Methylbutyric acid	2-Methylbutanoic acid	2-Methylbutanoate	2-Methylbutanoate	C_{5}H_{10}O_{2}	CH_{3}CH_{2}CH(CH_{3})COOH	102.13	

== Functions ==
SCFAs are produced when dietary fiber is fermented in the colon. Acetate, propionate and butyrate are the three most common SCFAs. SCFAs and medium-chain fatty acids are primarily absorbed through the portal vein during lipid digestion, while long-chain fatty acids are packed into chylomicrons, enter lymphatic capillaries, then transfer to the blood at the subclavian vein.

SCFAs have diverse physiological roles in body functions, affecting the production of lipids, energy, and vitamins. Butyric acid supports large intestine health as the primary energy source for colonocytes – the epithelial cells of the colon. The liver can use acetate for energy.

== See also ==
- List of carboxylic acids
- Medium-chain fatty acid (MCFA), fatty acid with aliphatic tails of 6 to 12 carbons, which can form medium-chain triglycerides
- Long-chain fatty acid (LCFA), fatty acid with aliphatic tails of 13 to 21 carbons
- Very long chain fatty acid (VLCFA), fatty acid with aliphatic tails of 22 or more carbons
- Odd-chain fatty acid
