= C25H40N7O17P3S =

The molecular formula C_{25}H_{40}N_{7}O_{17}P_{3}S (molar mass: 835.609 g/mol) may refer to:

- Crotonyl-CoA
- Methacrylyl-CoA
