= Methacrylyl-CoA =

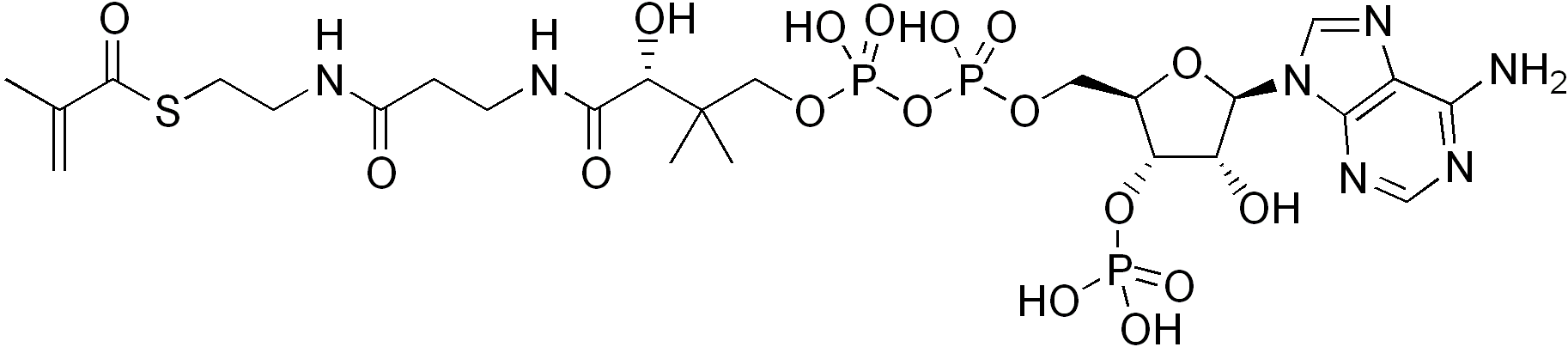

Names
- IUPAC name 3′-O-Phosphonoadenosine 5′-[(3R)-3-hydroxy-2-methyl-4-{[3-({2-[(2-methylprop-2-enoyl)sulfanyl]ethyl}amino)-3-oxopropyl]amino}-4-oxobutyl dihydrogen phosphate]
- Systematic IUPAC name O^{1}-{[(2R,3S,4R,5R)-5-(6-Amino-9H-purin-9-yl)-4-hydroxy-3-(phosphonooxy)oxolan-2-yl]methyl} O^{3}-[(3R)-3-hydroxy-2-methyl-4-{[3-({2-[(2-methylprop-2-enoyl)sulfanyl]ethyl}amino)-3-oxopropyl]amino}-4-oxobutyl] dihydrogen diphosphate

Identifiers
CAS Number	6008-91-9
3D model (JSmol)	Interactive image
ChemSpider	144985
MeSH	methacrylyl-coenzyme+A
PubChem CID	165390
UNII	FZ43RKZ3NL
CompTox Dashboard (EPA)	DTXSID00863677 DTXSID10975513, DTXSID00863677
- InChI: InChI=1S/C25H40N7O17P3S/c1-13(2)24(37)53-8-7-27-15(33)5-6-28-22(36)19(35)25(3,4)10-46-52(43,44)49-51(41,42)45-9-14-18(48-50(38,39)40)17(34)23(47-14)32-12-31-16-20(26)29-11-30-21(16)32/h11-12,14,17-19,23,34-35H,1,5-10H2,2-4H3,(H,27,33)(H,28,36)(H,41,42)(H,43,44)(H2,26,29,30)(H2,38,39,40)/t14-,17-,18-,19+,23-/m1/s1 Key: NPALUEYCDZWBOV-NDZSKPAWSA-N
- SMILES: O[C@@H]1[C@H](OP(O)(O)=O)[C@@H](COP(OP(OCC(C)(C)[C@@H](O)C(NCCC(NCCSC(C(C)=C)=O)=O)=O)(O)=O)(O)=O)O[C@H]1N2C(N=CN=C3N)=C3N=C2

Properties
Chemical formula	C_{25}H_{40}N_{7}O_{17}P_{3}S
Molar mass	835.61 g/mol
- Except where otherwise noted, data are given for materials in their standard state (at 25 °C [77 °F], 100 kPa). verify (what is ?) Infobox references

Methacrylyl-CoA is an intermediate in the metabolism of valine.

Methacrylyl-CoA is an organic pyrophosphate, a compound which contains the pyrophosphate oxoanion. It’s practically insoluble in water, being a fatty ester lipid molecule. It’s also found in both mice and humans, as a metabolite in the valine, leucine and isoleucine degradation pathway. Methacrylyl-CoA reacts strongly with free thiol compounds. There are several food items in which methacrylyl-CoA has been reported as detected, but not quantified. Examples include garlic, watermelon, curry powder and cucumber. A disease associated with methacrylyl-CoA is Leigh disease, through the accumulation of the compound, caused by a deficiency of 3-hydroxyisobutyryl-CoA hydrolase or short-chain enoyl-CoA hydratase.
