= Cyclodextran =

Chemical compound

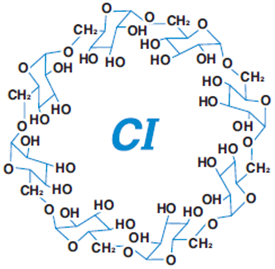
Structure of cyclodextran (CI-8)

Cyclodextran, also known as cyclic isomaltooligosaccharide (CI), is a cyclic oligosaccharide composed of glucose units linked primarily by α-1,6 glycosidic bonds. It is a non-reducing carbohydrate derived from dextran or related glucans through enzymatic cyclization.

== Structure and nomenclature ==
Cyclodextran is distinct from cyclodextrin, another class of cyclic glucose oligomers, in its linkage pattern. Whereas cyclodextrins are composed of α-1,4-linked glucose units, cyclodextrans consist of α-1,6-linked glucose units. Reported cyclodextrans vary in ring size, and multiple homologues have been identified.

== Discovery and production ==
Cyclodextran was first reported in 1993 during studies of bacterial cultures grown on dextran-containing media. It was identified as a cyclic product distinct from linear isomaltooligosaccharides.

Trace amounts of cyclodextran have also been reported from brown sugar.

Cyclodextran is produced by enzymatic conversion of dextran, typically through the action of cycloisomaltooligosaccharide glucanotransferase (CITase). Some studies have also described pathways in which related enzymes generate cyclodextrans from starch-derived glucans.

== Properties ==
As a cyclic carbohydrate, cyclodextran lacks a reducing end and is classified as a non-reducing oligosaccharide. It is water-soluble and relatively stable under a range of chemical conditions. Studies have also examined its ability to interact with other compounds in aqueous systems.

Cyclodextran has also been examined in studies of glucan-related processes in oral bacteria.
