= Gut–memory connection =

The gut–memory connection is the relation between the gastrointestinal tract and memory performance. The phenomenon of the gut–memory connection is based on and part of the idea of the gut-brain axis, a complex communication network, linking the central nervous system to the gut. The gut-brain axis first gained significant momentum in research and formal recognition in the 20th century with advancements in neuroscience and gastroenterology. The idea of a connection between the gut and emotion has been hinted at in various ancient traditions and medical practices for centuries.

As a vital conduit for the communication between gastrointestinal tract and the brain, the gut-brain axis influences a variety of physiological processes. A prominent example of the gut–memory connection is the effects that alterations in the gut microbiome can have on the pathogenesis of neural diseases like Alzheimer's.

Understanding the connections between the gut microbiome and cognitive health could aid researchers in developing novel strategies for slowing down cognitive decline in neurodegenerative diseases.

== Origins ==
The gut-brain axis is a two-way communication network within human systems that correlates the gut microbiome and the brain, encompassing immune, endocrine and neural connections. There is an evident association between the gastrointestinal tract and enteric microbiota with functional changes highlighted in the nervous system evidenced in vivo and vitro studies. This relationship plays a role in maintaining brain health as a result of resident microbes in the GI tract, influencing pathophysiology and mental behaviours. This can be accomplished through neuronal function directly or indirectly via vitamins, neurotransmitters and metabolites. The exact biochemical pathway for this has yet to be determined, while some experimental data may suggest afferent sensory neurons travel via neuroimmune and endocrine systems traveling over the vagus nerve. This demonstrates a commensalistic relationship between bacteria that exist in the human GI tract reaping from a diverse source of nutrients while providing indigestible nutrients available to the host.

It has also been hypothesized that IBS can originate as a result of brain-to-gut or gut-to-brain syndrome as well which emphasizes the importance of the gut-brain axis. Neurological disorders could also be a result of microbiota factors explaining why the intestine is known as the second brain as opposed to having neural origin. This uncovers the link to discovering mental and neurological disorders such as depression and anxiety with gut microbiota health. While not much of the ancestral origin of these interactions is not well known, this has a long history based on the coevolution and ecological interactions between vertebrates and bacteria, tightly coupled in animal evolution. This can also be evidenced by observing the role of bacteria such as the Hydra holobiont in contractile behaviour necessary for gut motility, demonstrating the product of ancient interaction between bacteria and emerging metazoans.

The ancestral mammalian gut likely harboured a diverse array of microbes that played essential roles in metabolism, digestion and immune response, and as a result, has evolved and adapted in response to selection and dietary pressures. With the development of the vertebrate nervous system, the coordination of digestive processes in the gastrointestinal tract with external stimuli would've allowed communication.

== Neuroanatomical basis ==
The anatomical basis of the gut–memory connection includes the gastrointestinal tract (GIT), which has its own intrinsic nervous system, called the enteric nervous system (ENS). The ENS controls intestinal function and can theoretically operate independently from the central nervous system (CNS). More than 100 million efferent neurons are present in the human ENS. They are connected to the brain through the vagus nerve, which seems to be the main mediator of gut-brain communication. Around 90% of the vagus nerve fibers connecting the brain and the ENS are afferent, meaning that the brain receives more information from the digestive system than it sends out. Afferent vagus nerve fibers have cell bodies in the nodose ganglia that synapse with the CNS. The signals are then relayed to the medial nucleus of the solitary tract (NTS), which in turn relays them to various brainstem and forebrain regions, including the hippocampus and the amygdala.

Signals from the GIT can activate the hippocampus, which was shown by directly stimulating the vagus nerve in human participants. The connection between the hippocampus and the medial NTS does not appear to be direct. Instead it seems to involve the locus coeruleus (LC) and the medial septum (MS), making the connection indirect. Studies have shown increased memory retention in both humans and rodents, following direct vagus nerve stimulation.

There are noradrenergic projections from the nucleus of the solitary tract to the amygdala, which is often associated with emotional learning. Direct Vagus nerve stimulation increases the release of noradrenaline in the amygdala and has been linked to increased fear depletion and positive outcomes of preclinical treatments of major depressive disorder (MDD).

Other factors that can indirectly influence memory function, include the immune system and hormonal processes. The ENS mediates HPA-axis function via gastrointestinal hormones, cytokines and neuropeptides. Through the same pathways the HPA-axis can influence the ENS. Therefore, the gut can indirectly influence hippocampal functioning and other cortical structures related to memory, via the HPA-axis.

== Probiotics ==
=== Probiotics and memory function ===
Probiotics, living bacteria with health benefits, are emerging as a potential tool to influence the microbiota-gut-brain axis and improve mental well-being. This axis is a complex communication network linking the gut and the brain, primarily mediated by the vagus nerve and the production of neuromodulators, which influence nerve activity and brain function. Although the exact molecular mechanisms are still unclear, the gut microbiota has been demonstrated to influence behaviour and brain functions, including pain perception, stress response, prefrontal myelination, and brain biochemistry.

Experimental manipulation of the gut microbial community composition has been shown to modify the host's neural function. For instance, long-term consumption of a probiotic Lactobacillus strain by BALB/c mice changed gamma-aminobutyric acid (GABA) expression in brain regions related to emotional processing. This alteration was associated with reduced anxiety and depression-like behaviour. A study found that consuming probiotics for 4–6 weeks altered neural activity in brain regions responsible for the central processing of emotion and sensation in healthy women, even without changes in gut microbial composition.

Given the evidence that gut microbiota influences emotional processing and the connections between emotion, memory, and decision-making, researchers hypothesized that probiotic ingestion could impact brain mechanisms related to such contexts. Their study demonstrated that administering a multi-strain probiotic significantly impacts behavioural scores and fMRI measures in brain regions involved in emotional decision-making and memory.

Probiotics contribute to the reduction of oxidative stress, a cellular process that can damage brain cells. Accordingly, probiotics may protect brain cells in the hippocampus, a region important for memory storage and retrieval while promoting a healthy gut lining.

A study in middle-aged rats examined the effects of probiotics, prebiotics and a combination of both, symbiotics, on memory. The study found that rats given the symbiotic supplement performed significantly better in spatial memory tests than the control groups. Improvement in memory was also accompanied by several positive changes in the brain. The symbiotic group showed lower levels of inflammation, a factor well known to impair memory. They also showed increased levels of brain-derived neurotrophic factor (BDNF), a protein important for memory formation, and higher levels of butyrate, a fatty acid produced by gut bacteria that can improve memory and altered brain cell activity patterns that promote learning and memory. A mixture of probiotics and prebiotics could be a way to improve cognitive abilities, particularly spatial memory.

=== Treatment along antibiotics ===
Antibiotic medication can disrupt the natural gut microbiome, leading to an imbalance in the gut-brain axis. Some studies in mice have shown that probiotic treatment can reverse the negative effects of antibiotics on bacteria in the gut, called dysbiosis and can also improve memory function. They further found that probiotics not only reduced gut dysbiosis associated with memory loss but also reduced the activity of specific enzymes associated with memory deficits, such as acetylcholinesterase and myeloperoxidase.

=== Impact on mental health ===
The link between gut bacteria and mental health, particularly anxiety and depression becomes a stronger focus in research. There exist studies on germ-free mice, devoid of any gut bacteria, that show the mice exhibit less anxiety compared to mice with a normal gut microbiome. Inflammations or infections of the gut tract of mice caused a change in certain behaviour associated with symptoms of anxiety, such as a less drive to explore and a stronger inhibition of behavioral responses. This hints at the potential influence specific types of bacteria might have on behaviour and mental health. Studies with rodents have experimentally shown similar results.

Some certain probiotic strains, like Lactobacillus rhamnosus and Bifidobacterium infantis, have shown promise in reducing anxiety-like behaviour in animal models. These probiotics are being explored as potential so-called psychobiotics for treating mental health conditions, such as depression and anxiety.

Further evidence comes from microbiota transfer experiments in mice, in which researchers transplanted gut bacteria from one strain of mice to another. It seems to influence their behaviour, suggesting the composition of the gut microbiome plays an important role. Stressful situations can also disrupt the delicate balance of gut bacteria and can lead to maternal separation and social defeat stress alters gut microbiota.

Some other studies of mice exposed to food deprivation or social disruption found changes in their gut bacteria composition. The influence seems to go both ways, since research using a depression model in mice revealed alterations in their gut bacteria compared to healthy mice. This, in turn, suggests that anxiety and depression might also affect the gut microbiome.

== Alzheimer's disease ==
The gut-brain axis acts as a communication network between the gastrointestinal tract and the brain. Due to this communication through neural, endocrine, and immune pathways, the gut microbiota and the brain can mutually influence their functions. Therefore, changes in the gut microbiota can influence the pathogenesis of various neurological diseases. There is rising evidence of a relationship between the gut microbiome and the neurodegenerative disease Alzheimer's.

The development and progression of Alzheimer's disease are characterised by abnormal brain protein aggregation, inflammation, immune dysregulation, and impaired neuronal and synaptic activity of the brain. These abnormalities associated with Alzheimer's disease are also associated with a dysregulation of the gut microbiome. There are different environmental factors such as diet, exercise and exposure to air pollution that have an impact on the gut microbiome and therefore could also have an influence on Alzheimer's disease. To have positive health outcomes the intestinal bacterial flora should be in an equilibrium. By consuming sufficient probiotics such as Bifidobacteria and Lactobacillus through a diet the achievement of this equilibrium is supported. Bifidobacteria and Lactobacillus can be taken as supplements but are also contained in different types of foods. To ensure a variety of microbiota strains in the gut a large and diverse diet is required.

Further research suggests a correlation between Alzheimer's disease, low insulin levels (diabetes type 1) and insulin resistance (diabetes type 2), that could be caused by amyloid beta-derived diffusible ligands (ADDLs). These ADDLs are neurotoxins that reduce synapse plasticity and provoke oxidative damage by altering the shape of insulin receptors. This inhibits the learning and memory mechanisms in the brain because Insulin usually supports the necessary regulation of processes like neuronal survival, energy metabolism, and plasticity. Insulin resistance could therefore explain the memory loss in AD patients.

There are different theories of the potential mechanisms through which the gut microbiome influences the pathogenesis of Alzheimer's disease. A viral or bacterial infection can contribute to the development of Alzheimer's disease. The Heliobacter pylori infection decreases the MMSE scores of patients with Alzheimer's disease through the release of inflammatory mediators. In addition, patients with Alzheimer's disease show higher serum levels of Aß40 and Aß42 if they are infected by a bacterial infection. The bacteria can alter the levels of specific neurotransmitters proteins and receptors which are responsible for synaptic plasticity. The theory of age-related dysbiosis associates the appearance of Alzheimer's disease with the ageing of the immune system. Through the process of ageing the levels of proteobacteria expand whereas the levels of probiotics decrease. These changes alter the composition of the gut microbiota. As an alteration of the gut microbiota occurs it can lead to differences in the activity of the brain. This connection raises the possibility of a treatment for patients diagnosed with Alzheimer's. Therapeutic treatment could manipulate the gut microbiome and therefore induce neuronal and synaptic changes in the patient's brain.

== Other related diseases ==
=== Irritable bowel syndrome ===
Irritable bowel syndrome or IBS is a gastrointestinal disorder with the disruption of the gut-brain axis as one of its characteristics. There are multiple ways in which this disorder impacts memory performance. IBS is a disorder that can cause chronic pain, stress and immune activity.

Many of the people suffering from IBS have visceral hypersensitivity. Pain disrupts attention which is a crucial factor for memory formation. The adverse effects of chronic pain also affect executive functioning, working memory, episodic memory and speed of information processing. Sleep deprivation in IBS patients is common and can have adverse effects on memory consolidation, executive functions and mental health, which also impairs memory.

IBS patients often show a higher response to stressors, causing dysregulation of the hypothalamic-pituitary-adrenal ( HPA ) axis and the autonomic nervous system ( ANS ). The activation of the HPA axis leads to the release of glucocorticoids, cortisol in humans. In people with IBS, the amount of cortisol was found to be higher which is related to a decline in hippocampus-dependent episodic memory performance. This also causes hippocampus deactivation and morphological changes which have been associated with spatial memory deficits. The decrease in blood flow to the hippocampus and other brain areas also seems to be involved in the effects of stress on the hippocampus.

The frontal lobes, which are involved in executive functions such as working memory, are more sensitive than the hippocampus to glucocorticoid levels causing similar disruptive effects of IBS as in the hippocampus. They are also affected by the ANS. The disruption of the ANS in IBS causes an increase in sympathetic nervous system activation and a decrease in parasympathetic nervous system activation, resulting in higher noradrenaline levels. This activates α1 receptors in the prefrontal cortex which impairs working memory. Noradrenaline and cortisol to the amygdala have the opposite effect and can enhance emotional memory formation which for IBS patients is shown as an enhanced memory for gastrointestinal-related words.

IBS patients have an abnormal immune activity which can be seen when measuring cytokines. They have a higher-than-normal amount of the proinflammatory cytokines IL6 and IL8 and some also have elevated TNF-α and IL1-α levels. ( IL6 is found to be related to cognitive abilities and Alzheimer's disease severity. ) Too much of it can affect memory by reducing neurogenesis in the dentate gyrus and inhibiting long term potentiation. The high amount of IL6 and TNF-α decreases episodic memory performance. IL1-α and TNF-α have these effects through LTP inhibition in the dentate gyrus and TNF-a, through excitotoxicity through the modulation of glutamate transmission also.

=== Obesity ===
Obesity is associated with many adverse effects physically and mentally. These include memory deficits. Obesity causes an increase in inflammation throughout the body. Cytokines, the chemicals that regulate this, can cross the blood-brain barrier in certain cases and affect the brain, including memory related areas.

Adipose tissue, which contains the fat, have certain neuroendocrine functions such as the production and release of adipokines. In obesity, the body is in a state of adiposopathy in which the secretion of adipokines changes. leptin, one of the adipokines, also promotes axonal growth and modulates NMDA functioning, enhancing LTP. In obese states, the body has leptin resistance, disrupting these effects of leptin.

In adiposopathy, the secretion of interleukin 6 is increased. This leads to reduced neurogenesis, the inhibition of LTP and impaired working memory performance as in irritable bowel syndrome. Some studies also suggest that cytokines such as interleukin 6 may reduce hippocampal grey matter volume.

== Animal studies ==
In order to analyze the effects gut microbiota has on our learning of spatial memory and cognition, animal studies can be applied to human studies. This implies the use of rats, and mice in experiments in order to study the effects of a sucrose diet on cognitive skills. Experiments on lab animals demonstrated similar results in human experiments whereas sucrose diet has an impact on cognitive abilities.

The excessive use of abundant sugar consumption has a significant impact on cognitive performance. Consistent consumption of foods rich in cholesterol shows that over a long duration decreases cognitive abilities, specifically spatial memory In order to study spatial learning using animal models, rodents are placed into an experiment called radial arm maze where the working memory of semantic memories of animals are tested.

This experiment uses operant conditioning such as rewards and punishments in order to measure working memory in rodents and motivate the animal towards a desired behaviour like figuring out where the food is located in the maze. Findings of high-fat diets include deficits in spatial memory and cognitive impairment. A study including obese mice which encompassed high levels of palmitic acid these high concentrations of acid demonstrated a change in the microbiota of the gut which shows deficits in cognition and spatial learning.

This type of acid found in an animal study shows similarities with humans, therefore this finding can be applied to humans as well. According to animal studies, high-fat diets contribute to significant alterations in gut microbiota and in decrease of spatial learning.
