= Isomaltooligosaccharide =

Mixture of short-chain carbohydrates

Isomaltooligosaccharide (IMO) is a mixture of short-chain carbohydrates which has a digestion-resistant property. IMO is found naturally in some foods, as well as being manufactured commercially. The raw material used for manufacturing IMO is starch, which is enzymatically converted into a mixture of isomaltooligosaccharides.

== Chemistry ==
The term "oligosaccharide" encompasses carbohydrates that are larger than simple di- or tri-saccharides, but smaller than polysaccharides (greater than 10 units). Isomalto-oligosaccharides (IMO) are glucose oligomers with α-D-(1,6)-linkages, including isomaltose, panose, isomaltotriose, isomaltotetraose, isomaltopentaose, nigerose, kojibiose, and higher branched oligosaccharides. Depending on production method, the structure of the IMO molecules can vary significantly. While human intestinal enzymes readily digest α(1,4)-glycosidic bonds, longer-chain IMOs (e.g. >= DP4) with α(1,6)-linkages are not easily hydrolyzed and exhibit a digestion-resistant property. Therefore, some IMO preparations are only partially digested in the upper gastrointestinal tract.

Isomalto-oligosaccharides are a normal part of the human diet and occur naturally in fermented foods, such as fermented sourdough breads and kimchi. The disaccharide isomaltose is also present in rice miso, soy sauce, and sake. Isomaltose, one of the α(1,6)-linked disaccharide components of IMO, has been identified as a natural constituent of honey and although chemically related, it is not an IMO . IMO is a sweet-tasting, high-density syrup which could be spray-dried into powder form.

== Manufacturing ==
For manufacturing IMO on a commercial scale, food industries use starch processed from cereal crops like wheat, barley, pulses (peas, beans, lentils), oats, tapioca, rice, potato and others. This variety in sources could benefit consumers who have allergies or hypersensitivity to certain cereal crops. The manufacturing process controls the degree of polymerization (dp) and the α(1,6)-linkages to ensure a consistent quality of IMO from different starch sources. The starch is first converted, by means of simple enzymatic hydrolysis, into high maltose syrup with di-, tri and oligosaccharides (2, 3 or more glucose units) having α(1,4)-glycosidic linkages which are readily digestible in the human intestine. These α(1,4)-glycosidic linkages are further converted into digestion-resistant α(1,6)-glycosidic linkages, creating "iso" linkages between glucose moieties and forming Isomalto-oligosaccharide (IMO).

The majority of oligosaccharides found in IMO consist of three to six monosaccharide (glucose) units linked together. However, disaccharides, as well as longer polysaccharides (up to nine glucose units), are also present. The disaccharide fraction of IMO consists mainly of α(1,6)-linked isomaltose, while maltotriose, panose, and isomaltotriose make up the trisaccharide fraction. A mixture of isomaltotetraose, isomaltopentaose, maltohexaose, maltoheptaose, and small amounts of oligomers with 8 or more degrees of polymerization, comprise the remaining oligomers in IMO. Longer oligomers do not have 100% α(1,6)-linkages; the ratio of α(1,4)- to α(1,6)-linkages is variable.

== Health claims ==
Animal studies describe IMO as a multifunctional molecule which exerts positive effects on digestive health; it acts as a prebiotic, decreases flatulence, has a low glycemic index, and prevents dental caries in animals.

Prebiotics are defined as "non-digestible food ingredients that may beneficially affect the host by selectively stimulating the growth and/or activity of a limited number of bacteria in the colon". Oligosaccharides that are not digested and absorbed in the small intestine, pass through to the colon where they are fermented by Bifidobacteria, thus enhancing the proliferation of the bacteria. In this respect, fermentable oligosaccharides may be considered prebiotics. The oligosaccharides in IMO mixtures are, at least partially, fermented by bacteria in the colon and may, therefore, stimulate the growth of bacterial subpopulations.

Dental caries is caused by the formation of insoluble glucan (plaque) on the surface of teeth, and the production of acids by bacteria in the plaque. These acids attack the hard tissues of the teeth. Studies with animal models showed that IMO, in place of sucrose, reduces the amount of plaque formed and also reduces the amount of enamel-attacking acids formed. Therefore, IMO acts as an anti-caries agent.

The reported Glycemic Index (GI) for IMO is 34.66±7.65 (on a scale of 1–100) which represents a low GI. Consumption of IMO effectively improved bowel movements, stool output and microbial fermentation in the colon without any adverse effects in elderly people.

Health claims for the various classes of oligosaccharides have been investigated by the European Food Safety Authority (EFSA) and found to be insufficiently substantiated. Therefore, health claims for oligosaccharides and prebiotics are prohibited in the European Union.

== Usage ==
IMO is finding global acceptance by food manufacturers for use in a wide range of food products, especially beverages and snack/nutrition bars. In the United States, IMO gained popularity around 2016 as an ingredient in snack bars, notably Quest Nutrition protein bars. However, IMO is also used as a low calorie sweetener in a variety of foods like bakery and cereal products. Since IMO is about 50% as sweet as sucrose (sugar), it cannot replace sugar in a one-to-one ratio. However, IMO has few side effects compared to other oligosaccharides of the same class. Therefore this carbohydrate molecule is receiving growing attention by food manufacturers across North America, as well as in Europe.

== Side-effects ==
Generally, all digestion-resistant oligosaccharides, including IMO, have adverse side effects when consumed in amounts greater than permissible levels. The maximum permissible dose of IMO is 1.5 g/kg body weight, which is higher than for any other sugar substitute. However, the U.S. Food and Drug Administration (FDA) has recommended a maximum consumption of 30 g/day for IMO. Higher dosages (greater than 40 g/day), can cause gastrointestinal symptoms like flatulence, bloating, soft stool or diarrhea.

== Regulatory information ==
IMO and other oligosaccharides have long been approved in China and Japan. In Japan, IMO has been on the list of Foods for Specified Health Use (FOSHU) for more than 10 years. In 2002, over 50% of the FOSHU foods in Japan incorporated oligosaccharides as the functional component. The list includes many types of foods: soft drinks and other beverages, frozen yogurt, confectionery products, sweeteners, cookies, coffee drink mixes, bread, tofu, chocolate, and soup mixes. IMO has been imported into the United States for the last few years but has never been manufactured there or formally approved by the FDA. In 2009, a Canadian-based company, BioNeutra, received FDA-GRAS and Health Canada approval for IMO. In 2018, BioNeutra filed a petition to the American FDA to have IMOs added to the dietary fiber list, but were denied. Under the 2016 FDA guidance, to be labeled "dietary fiber," two criteria must be met: non-digestible by human enzymes and proven physiological benefit (e.g., fermentation, blood sugar moderation), the first of which IMO failed to meet. In the European Union, IMO is authorised as a novel food (NF) pursuant to Regulation (EU) 2015/2283.

== Commercial availability ==
IMO is commercially manufactured mostly in China and Japan. However, most of this product is consumed locally or exported to neighboring Asian countries. In Japan, Meiji Dairies (Meiji Food Company) is one of the biggest IMO producers. IMO is marketed under several trade names like IMO-900 and IMO-800. Being a novel food ingredient, there wasn't a producer of IMO in North America and Europe until BioNeutra North America, Inc. began to manufacture this product with the VitaFiber IMO trademark, which was approved for use in Canada by Health Canada in 2012. US-based companies have also been producing other kinds of oligosaccharides, like GOS, FOS, and XOS.

== See also ==
- Fructooligosaccharide – Oligosaccharide fructans (FOS)
- Galactooligosaccharide – Class of prebiotics (GOS)
- Xylooligosaccharide – Polymer of the sugar xylose (XOS)
