= Prebiotic score =

Measure of effects of prebiotics

A Prebiotic Score, also known as Prebiotic Activity Score, is a term sometimes used to estimate the health effects of prebiotics in humans or animals. The idea is that although prebiotics may have many different effects in the human gut, some of these may be quantified and combined to an overall score. For example, an increase in the populations of bifidobacteria or lactobacilli coincides with a relative increase in prebiotic activity; accordingly, an increase in enteric bacteria strains such as Clostridium perfringens result in a decrease of prebiotic activity. Also, increases and reductions of certain enzymes may be used as factors in a prebiotic score.

== Measure of the prebiotic effect ==
Measure of the prebiotic effect (MPE) is a quantitative analysis that takes into an account a number of dominant bacterial groups and end products of fermentation such as short-chain fatty acids (SCFA) and substrate assimilation. MPE was developed by Jelena Vulevic in conjunction with Glenn R Gibson and Robert Rastall and sponsored by Novartis Consumer Health

== Quantitative approaches ==
Several quantitative approaches have been developed to aid in the analysis of prebiotics and their individual and collective activity within the gut microbiome. These approaches are in part used to calculate the Measure of the Prebiotic Effect or (MPE).

=== Prebiotic Index (PI) ===
One of the first quantitative approaches, the Prebiotic index or (PI), is a quantitative tool used to compare the prebiotic effect of dietary oligosaccharides. The Prebiotic Index equation takes into account bifidobacteria (Bif), bacteroides (Bac), lactobacilli (Lac), and clostridia (Clos):
PI = (Bif/Total) - (Bac/Total) + (Lac/Total) - (Clos/Total)

=== Rate of assimilation ===
The rate of assimilation is the measure of the substrate assimilation calculated by measuring the substrate concentration over time:
S_{t} = substrate concentration after the time interval, _{t}, e.g. in hours; S_{0} = initial substrate concentration and A_{r} = rate of substrate assimilation, e.g. per hour, e.g. during the exponential phase of bacterial population growth.
Rate of Assimilation: S_{t} = S_{0} - A_{r}t

=== Rate of growth ===
Rate of growth is determined by an equation that is based on the rate of growth for the bacterial populations.
Rate of growth uses the following equation:
ln N_{t} = ln N_{0} + μ_{t}

=== Adjusted prebiotic index ===
PIm = μmaxBif + μmaxLac + μmaxEub - μmaxBac - μmaxClos - μmaxEC - μmaxSRB

=== Total short-chain fatty acids ===
TSCFA = A + B + P + L

where A is acetate, B is butyrate, P is propionate and L is lactate

=== Ratio of lactate to total short-chain fatty acids ===
Ratio = dL/dTSCFA

=== Measure of the prebiotic effect ===
MPE = 0.5(X^{2}Y^{2}+Y^{2}Z^{2}+Z^{2}X^{2})^{0.5}

== See also ==
- Probiotic
- Psychobiotic
