= Akkermansia biwaensis =

Scientific classification
- Domain: Bacteria
- Kingdom: Pseudomonadati
- Phylum: Verrucomicrobiota
- Class: Verrucomicrobiia
- Order: Verrucomicrobiales
- Family: Akkermansiaceae
- Genus: Akkermansia
- Species: A. biwaensis

Binomial name
- Akkermansia biwaensis Kobayashi et al. 2023

Species of bacteria

Akkermansia biwaensis is a species of bacteria found in the human gut microbiome.

== Discovery ==
The type strain of A. biwaensis was isolated in Japan in 2023 from the feces of healthy adults. It was delineated from other Akkermansia species on the basis of differences in the 16S gene sequence; in previous studies, it was considered to be a phylogroup of Akkermansia muciniphila, specifically the AmIV phylogroup. It is named after Lake Biwa, which is near the place of origin of the type strain.

== Growth and morphology ==
Akkermansia biwaensis is oval-shaped, gram-negative, catalase-positive, and non-motile, with cell lengths ranging from 0.5 to 1.0 μm. Growth has been observed between 25 and 45 °C, with optimal temperatures ranging between 30 and 37 °C. Colonies have been described cream-colored with round edges.

Like other Akkermansia spp., A. biwaensis is capable of utilizing mucin as a sole source of carbon and nitrogen. Other available energy sources include glucose and lactose; no growth has been observed on other common sugars such as galactose, fructose, or fucose.

== Role in human health ==
Akkermansia biwaensis, although relatively rare in the human gut microbiome, may be linked to lower obesity rates in children; however, its low prevalence makes it difficult to study its impact on human health. It is capable of metabolizing human milk oligosaccharides, enabling it to colonize infants.

== Host species ==
In addition to humans, A. biwaensis has also been found to colonize mouse microbiomes.
