= Anti-inflammatory agents in breast milk =

The anti-inflammatory components in breast milk are bioactive substances that confer, increase, and regulate the anti-inflammatory response in a breastfeeding infant. These components include vitamins, oligosaccharides, cytokines, growth factors, lipids, proteins, antioxidants, and microbes, all of which work together to protect infants from excessive or harmful inflammation as a byproduct of immune response.

Many of these components, such as human milk oligosaccharides (HMOs), secretory immunoglobulin A (SIgA), lactoferrin, epidermal growth factors, and various anti-inflammatory cytokines, act by reducing pro-inflammatory signaling, thus preventing pathogen adhesion and strengthening mucosal barriers in the gut. Other components such as fatty acids and microbes balance inflammatory pathways. Collectively, the anti-inflammatory agents in breast milk support the infant's transition from the intrauterine environment to the outside world.

The anti-inflammatory properties of breast milk are believed to influence long-term health outcomes, suggesting a lower risk of chronic inflammatory conditions later in life due to early exposure to immune-regulating agents. Additionally, topical application of breast milk is often used to decrease effects of inflammatory skin conditions and reactions.

Breast milk's composition and concentration of anti-inflammatory agents varies according to numerous factors including lactation stage, maternal physiology, infant needs, and history of infection or vaccination in the mother. Early milk contains higher levels of HMOs, immunoglobulins, and regulatory cytokines, while milk from mothers with preterm infants often contains enhanced anti-inflammatory and immune-supportive components. Ongoing debates compare breast milk to formula milk.

== List of components ==
Anti-inflammatory components of breastmilk

Bioactive component	Function/effect on inflammatory response
Vitamin A, Vitamin C, Vitamin E	react with free radicals before damage can occur to healthy cells
Human milk oligosaccharides (HMOs)	enhance gut maturation; have prebiotic and probiotic action by promoting healthy gut bacteria and acidity levels; have anti-adhesive effect (prevent pathogens and leukocytes from sticking to cells in intestinal tract and triggering an inflammatory response); have an antimicrobial effect; regulate immune response by decreasing (or competing with) pro-inflammatory cytokine secretion and promoting regulatory T cells which monitor the immune system and prevent it from over-reacting and inflaming
Cytokines (i)	Small protein messengers that the immune system uses to regulate inflammatory and immune responses
interleukin-2 (IL-2)	promotes immune-regulating T cells
interleukin-10 (IL-10)	inhibits immune response by inhibiting TK, Th1, and other immune cells; regulates the immune system; suppresses inflammation
interleukin-12 (IL-12)	decreases activity of inflammatory-promoting reactions
transforming growth-factor beta (TGF beta)	decreases pro-inflammatory cytokine expression; aids in intestinal maturation
interleukin-1 receptor antagonist (IL-1RA)	limits inflammation by competing with IL-1 (which is a pro-inflammatory cytokine)
epidermal growth factor (EGF)	a peptide that strengthens gut barrier by increasing epithelial cell production; decreases inflammatory response; most abundant in early milk/colostrum
heparin-binding epidermal growth factor (HB-EGF)	part of the EGF family; promotes wound healing; suppresses inflammatory processes; decreases pro-inflammatory cytokines
vascular epidermal growth factor (VEGF)	part of the EGF family; glycoprotein that regulates angiogenesis (blood vessel formation for wound healing); decreases pro-inflammatory cytokines
adipokines	signaling molecules/cytokines that change macrophages so that they can become anti-inflammatory rather than pro-inflammatory
Lipids	
omega-3 polyunsaturated fatty acid (PUFA) (ii)	decreases activity of inflammatory-promoting reactions and inhibits pro-inflammatory gene expression while increasing anti-inflammatory microbes including omega-6
eicosapentaenoic acid (EPA)	comes from omega-3; works against pro-inflammatory amino acids
free fatty acids and monoglycerides	increase anti-inflammatory microbes
Other proteins	saturation decreases as the infant matures; aid in nutrition and nutrient absorption; increase antimicrobial and immune effects
secretory immunoglobulin A (SIgA)	defends gut from microorganisms; decreases inflammatory responses to microbes; remains in the intestinal environment and plays a role in immunity without triggering inflammation
[high levels of] immunoglobulin M and immunoglobulin G (iii)	IgM: protects mucosal surfaces from viruses; IgG: transferred mainly from mother to infant through the placenta, but also through mammary glands (present in colostrum); direct binding, agglutination, and opsonization of pathogens has an anti-inflammatory effect
lysozyme	is a protein that blocks microbes
lactoferrin (LF)	is an immune-supporting whey protein; antimicrobial (protects from microorganisms); assists in regulation of cell proliferation and differentiation; has anti-inflammatory and immune effects; LF releases a peptide antibiotic in the stomach called lactoferricin; blocks pro-inflammatory cytokines by competing with their release and interfering with endothelial cells that signal for inflammatory responses
lactadherin	is a glycoprotein; antimicrobial and immune role; reduces inflammation by promoting immune cells and inhibiting pro-inflammatory cytokines
toll-like receptors (TLRs)	prevents pro-inflammatory cytokine expression
beta defensins	bioactive peptides; recruit T cells and enhance TLRs
chondroitin sulfate	decreases production of pro-inflammatory cytokines
antioxidants and antiproteases	antiproteases: inhibit pathogen entry into the body, which limits inflammation. Metabolize proteases that inflammatory cells produce; antioxidants: scavenge free radicals so that they can no longer damage cells
Bacteria	Certain microbes like Staphylococcus, Streptococcus, Lactobacillus, Enterococcus, Bifidobacterium, Propionibacterium, and the Enterobacteriaceae family are present in human breast milk.
bifidobacterium	increase fatty acid production; decrease pro-inflammatory cytokine secretion
lactobacillus	inhibit immune and inflammatory response pathways; decrease pro-inflammatory cytokine secretion
Cells and cell parts	The mixture of different cells in breast milk creates a diverse environment in the gut.
microRNA	releases inflammatory regulators
extracellular vesicles	inhibit overactivation of TLRs

i. Breast milk is a source for anti-inflammatory cytokines and pro-inflammatory cytokines such as IL-1, IL-6, IL-8, TNF alpha, IFN-y. A unique characteristic of breast milk is the balance of inflammation-suppressing and inflammation-activating pathways. Pro-inflammatory cytokines fight infection, while anti-inflammatory cytokines counteract the pro-inflammatory ones to keep them in check without overreacting.

ii. Omega-3 and omega-6 PUFAs work together. Omega–3 PUFAs increase omega-6 (arachidonic acid) which is an inflammatory agent, thus decreasing inflammation effects.

iii. IgM and IgG are both pro and anti-inflammatory, but higher levels tend to be more anti-inflammatory.

== Impact on infants and the body ==
Upon birth, infants are no longer protected in the highly regulated womb and are thus exposed to the outside world where pathogens and risk of injury are increased. Nursing infants receive anti-inflammatory agents from their mother's milk, which can aid in reduced inflammation following internal or external threats and harm.

Inflammation is an innate response that works to repair tissue damage and combat threats to the immune system. Upon injury or illness, immune signaling molecules called cytokines trigger inflammatory responses to isolate the affected area by increasing blood flow, plasma leakage, and physical pain.

Infant guts are the initial site of immune and inflammatory responses, where anti-inflammatory agents in breast milk support these environments to reduce inflammation effects. Internally, breast milk promotes epithelial maturation in the intestinal tract.

Anti-inflammatory and immunity agents in breast milk seem to guide the development of infant gut maturation, immune system response, and continuous anti-inflammatory effects. Thus, breast-fed infants are hypothesized to have decreased chances of developing chronic inflammatory diseases in later stages of life.

=== Topical application ===
Topical breast milk application can soothe and aid contact dermatitis, atopic dermatitis (eczema), and other tissue infections or disturbances in infants and other people alike.

== Influencing factors ==
- Lactation stage
  - Breast milk secretions change over time with the infant's developmental period and current needs, maturing from colostrum to mature milk. Colostrum tends to have higher concentrations of HMOs and immune agents.
  - Breast milk composition changes over the course of a single day.
- Infant needs
  - It is widely accepted that breast milk composition changes based on the infant's needs. The anti-inflammatory scope of this includes an increase in bioactive components that fight infection while also regulating inflammation.
- Preterm vs full term infants
  - Mothers who deliver preterm infants tend to secrete breast milk with greater levels of anti-inflammatory agents than mothers who deliver full term infants.
- Maternal immunity and exposure to disease
  - Maternal vaccination status and history of infection by a specific disease may influence bioactive components and their concentration in breast milk, but this research is still ongoing as of March 2025, especially in light of a post-pandemic world.
- Maternal age, physiology, and lifestyle factors
  - Some factors of breast milk, specifically HMO type and amount, are genetically determined.
  - Maternal age does not greatly affect breast milk composition, but mothers aged 20 to 30 are more likely to secrete breast milk with higher protein contents than other age groups.
  - Maternal diet does not tend to greatly affect breast milk composition, save for fatty acids such as omega-3 and omega-6.
  - First time mothers often secrete breast milk with higher concentrations of anti-inflammatory and immune system enhancing agents, with concentrations decreasing with more pregnancies.

=== Breast milk versus formula milk ===
There is an ongoing debate regarding the difference between breast milk and formula milk stemming from the increase in popularity of formula beginning in the 1950s. Though both options provide nutritional benefits, breast milk is often regarded as a source of bioactive components which have been shown in numerous studies beginning in the 1980s to increase immunity and regulate inflammation. Compared to formula-fed infants, breast-fed infants have two times the amount of bacterial cells. Formula milk does not contain SIgA.
