= Kestose =

Sugar from fructooligosaccharide group

1-Kestose
- Chemical structure of 1-kestose trisaccharide

Names
- IUPAC name α-D-gluco-Hexopyranosyl β-D-arabino-hex-2-ulofuranosyl-(2→1)-β-D-arabino-hex-2-ulofuranoside
- Systematic IUPAC name (2R,3R,4S,5S,6R)-2-[(2S,3S,4S,5R)-2-[[(2R,3S,4S,5R)-3,4-dihydroxy-2,5-bis(hydroxymethyl)oxolan-2-yl]oxymethyl]-3,4-dihydroxy-5-(hydroxymethyl)oxolan-2-yl]oxy-6-(hydroxymethyl)oxane-3,4,5-triol
- Other names 1-Kestose; O-beta-D-Fructofuranosyl-(2.1)-beta-D-fructofuranosyl-alpha-D-glucopyranoside

Identifiers
| CAS Number | 470-69-9 |
| 3D model (JSmol) | Interactive image |
| ChEBI | CHEBI:16885 |
| ChemSpider | 389087 |
| EC Number | 207-429-4 |
| KEGG | C03661; G02515 |
| PubChem CID | 440080 |
| UNII | 02LN7O412C |
- InChI: InChI=1S/C18H32O16/c19-1-6-9(23)12(26)13(27)16(31-6)34-18(15(29)11(25)8(3-21)33-18)5-30-17(4-22)14(28)10(24)7(2-20)32-17/h6-16,19-29H,1-5H2/t6-,7-,8-,9-,10-,11-,12+,13-,14+,15+,16-,17-,18+/m1/s1 Key: VAWYEUIPHLMNNF-OESPXIITSA-N
- SMILES: C([C@@H]1[C@H]([C@@H]([C@H]([C@H](O1)O[C@]2([C@H]([C@@H]([C@H](O2)CO)O)O)CO[C@]3([C@H]([C@@H]([C@H](O3)CO)O)O)CO)O)O)O)O

Properties
| Chemical formula | C_{18}H_{32}O_{16} |
| Molar mass | 504.438 g·mol^{−1} |
- Except where otherwise noted, data are given for materials in their standard state (at 25 °C [77 °F], 100 kPa). Infobox references

Kestose is a class of sugars that belongs to a group of fructooligosaccharides.

== Chemical properties ==
Kestoses are typical fructooligosaccharides, and in its structure, one fructose molecule is combined with sucrose to form a trisaccharide. In the 1-kestose type, the fructose molecule will be connected to sucrose by a (1→2β) glycosidic bond. Different types of kestoses have different lengths of subunits in the chain, for example, 6-kestose has from 10 to 200 fructose residues and is also called levan type fructooligosaccharide. Also, 1-kestose has less than 50 fructose residues in the chain and is also called inulin type fructooligosaccharide. Kestoses are categorized based on their structure into 3 main groups: 1-kestose, 6-kestose, neokestose. The most common of them is 1-kestose which is found in many plants.

== Biosynthesis ==
According to the conditions of the plant cell, kestose biosynthesis occurs in the vacuole. The precursor molecule of kestose is sucrose. The sucrose-sucrose fructosyl transferase enzyme relates a sucrose molecule with a fructose residue to a second sucrose molecule, producing a kestose-1 molecule. Following, the enzyme fructan-fructan 1-fructosyl transferase combines fructose residue from trisaccharides, and by that synthetase longer kestose-1 chain. Respectively, to synthesize 6-kestose chain, the enzyme fructan-fructan 6-fructosyl transferase should combine fructose residue from trisaccharide and that synthesize a longer chain.

== Food sources ==
As well as other fructooligosaccharides, kestose can be found in such plants as wheat, onions, asparagus, and banana. Moreover, the plant families of Compositae, Amaryllidaceae, Gramineae and Liliaceae contain kestose along with other fructooligosaccharides in parts of the plant such as fruits, roots, and tubers.

Kestose-1 composition in various vegetables
| Ingredient | mg/g |
|---|---|
| Acorn Squash | 0.2 |
| Artichoke (globe) | 1.5 |
| Carrot (Bunny Luv) | 0.3 |
| Chicory root | 1.7 |
| Garlic | 3.3 |
| Leek | 0.7 |
| Lettuce | 0.3 |
| Shallot | 4.5 |
| Yam | 0.2 |

== Industrial production ==
In the industry, kestose, like other fructooligosaccharides, is produced by transfructosylation reaction of sucrose with the enzyme B-fructofuranosidase, which is obtained from the mold fungus Aspergillus niger.

== Potential health effects ==
=== Prebiotic activity ===
Kestose as well as many other fructooligosaccharides belong to the prebiotics, i.e. to the substances that have a positive effect on the intestinal microbiome after consuming them in food. In particular, the consumption of kestose mixed with other fructooligosaccharides increases the concentration of healthy probiotic bifidobacteria and decreases the concentration of the Clostridia, bacteria associated with inflammatory processes.

Consequently, kestoses complies with the essential criteria required for a prebiotic: 1) they are not digested by enzymes of the mammalian host organism, 2) they have a positive effect on only positive probiotic microorganisms growth, 3) they have a positive effect on the microbiome in general, 4) they have a positive effect on the defense system of host organism.

=== Consumption with food ===
Kestose has less caloric value than sucrose, and is not a promoter of tooth decay. Consumption of kestose, as well as other prebiotics, reduces the risk of cancer, hyperlipidaemia and acute gastroenteritis.

In particular, kestoses perform their prebiotic function by positively influencing the growth of lactobacilli and bifidobacteria probiotics, which protect the host organism from acute gastroenteritis, which appears when pathogenic microorganisms multiply in the intestines and has symptoms such as diarrhea, vomiting, and pain in the abdomen.

=== Impact of kestose-1 on glucose metabolism in rats with type 2 diabetes ===
Studies on rats have shown that the consumption of kestose-1 helps the propagation of probiotics such as Anaerostipes caccae in the intestinal microflora. These probiotics are butyrate producer bacteria, which through the production of butyrate contribute to glucose tolerance and weight loss in rodents. Also, the consumption of kestose-1 by rats promotes the multiplication of probiotics of the bifidobacteria class, which produce the metabolites acetate and lactate, which in turn Anaerostipes caccae also uses to synthesize butyrate.

=== Impact of kestose-1 on symptoms of the atopic dermatitis disease ===
Studies show the positive effect of consumption of prebiotic kestose-1 on the reproduction of microorganisms Faecalibacterium prausnitzii, which have an anti-inflammatory effect due to the production of short-chain fatty acid - butyrate. Butyrate in turn promotes the differentiation of regulatory T cells, which have the function of suppressing the production of T helper 2 cytokines that cause inflammatory processes in allergic reactions such as atopic dermatitis disease. Significant results were achieved with the consumption of kestose-1 for multiplication of Faecalibacterium prausnitzii probiotic, and in the consequence of relief of symptoms of atopic dermatitis disease in children aged 2 to 5 years, after 6 weeks of consumption of kestose-1 in food.

=== Other activities ===
1-Kestose supplementation has been found to increase dopamine and serotonin levels in the brain and increase locomotor activity in rodents. The intervention increased levels of the gut bacteria Bifidobacteria and Akkermansia and decreased other species.

== See also ==
- Mannitol and aspartame
