= Lacto-N-tetraose =

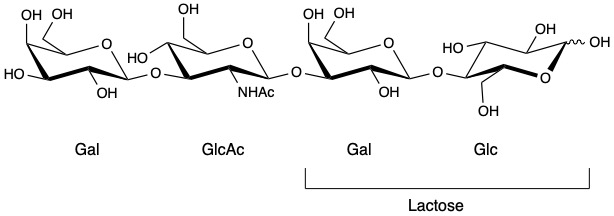
- Chemical structure of lacto-N-tetraose

Names
- IUPAC name N-[(4-Deoxy-D-glucos-4-yl 3-deoxy-β-D-galactopyranosid-3-yl) β-D-galactopyranosyl-(1→3)-(2-deoxy-β-D-glucopyranosid-2-yl)]acetamide
- Systematic IUPAC name N-[(2S,3R,4R,5S,6R)-2-{[(2R,3S,4S,5R,6S)-3,5-Dihydroxy-2-(hydroxymethyl)-6-{[(2R,3R,4R,5R)-1,2,4,5-tetrahydroxy-6-oxohexan-3-yl]oxy}oxan-4-yl]oxy}-5-hydroxy-6-(hydroxymethyl)-4-{[(2R,3R,4S,5R,6R)-3,4,5-trihydroxy-6-(hydroxymethyl)oxan-2-yl]oxy}oxan-3-yl]acetamide
- Other names β-D-Gal-(1→3)-β-D-GlcNAc-(1→3)-β-D-Gal-(1→4)-D-Glc

Identifiers
CAS Number	14116-68-8
3D model (JSmol)	Interactive image
ChEBI	CHEBI:30248
ChEMBL	ChEMBL595538
ChemSpider	389818
KEGG	C06371
PubChem CID	440993
UNII	46XNQ2LX59
CompTox Dashboard (EPA)	DTXSID10331554
- InChI: InChI=1S/C26H45NO21/c1-6(32)27-11-21(47-25-18(39)15(36)12(33)7(2-28)44-25)13(34)8(3-29)43-24(11)48-22-14(35)9(4-30)45-26(19(22)40)46-20-10(5-31)42-23(41)17(38)16(20)37/h7-26,28-31,33-41H,2-5H2,1H3,(H,27,32)/t7-,8-,9-,10-,11-,12+,13-,14+,15+,16-,17-,18-,19-,20-,21-,22+,23?,24+,25+,26+/m1/s1 Key: AXQLFFDZXPOFPO-FSGZUBPKSA-N
- SMILES: CC(=O)N[C@@H]1[C@H]([C@@H]([C@H](O[C@H]1O[C@H]2[C@H]([C@H](O[C@H]([C@@H]2O)O[C@@H]3[C@H](OC([C@@H]([C@H]3O)O)O)CO)CO)O)CO)O)O[C@H]4[C@@H]([C@H]([C@H]([C@H](O4)CO)O)O)O

Properties
Chemical formula	C_{26}H_{45}NO_{21}
Molar mass	707.632 g·mol^{−1}
- Except where otherwise noted, data are given for materials in their standard state (at 25 °C [77 °F], 100 kPa). Infobox references

Lacto-N-tetraose is a complex sugar found in human milk. It is one of the few characterized human milk oligosaccharides (HMOs) and is enzymatically synthesized from the substrate lactose. It is biologically relevant in the early development of the infant gut flora.

== Structure ==
Lacto-N-tetraose is a tetrasaccharide composed of four monosaccharide units in the order galactose, N-acetylglucosamine, another galactose, and glucose, joined by "1-3 β-linkages" in a linear chain. It has the chemical formula C_{26}H_{45}NO_{21}, shared with its related human milk oligosaccharide isomer lacto-N-neotetraose. The molecule consisting of the first two monosaccharide units is called lacto-N-biose (presumably because it is a biose containing a nitrogen atom and involved in milk). and when this is attached to a lactose molecule the tetrasaccharide is called lacto-N-tetraose.

It is a reducing sugar with a free anomeric center at the terminal glucose molecule indicating an equilibrium between the alpha (α) and beta (β) anomers. This characteristic of reducing sugars is seen through a positive Benedict's Test.

Lactose-N-tetraose has the oligosaccharide nomenclature β-D-galactosyl-(1→3)-N-acetyl-β-D-glucosaminyl-(1→3)-β-D-galactosyl-(1→4)-D-glucose, and consists of lactose with an additional lactose-N-biose disaccharide at the non-reducing end.

Lacto-N-tetraose is classified as a type I chain oligosaccharide due to the β(1→3) linkage at the non-reducing end. The β(1→4) linkage at the non-reducing end of lacto-N-neotetraose makes it a type II chain.

Through chemical and structural characterization, it has been identified that related oligosaccharides are often modifications of a single disaccharide. This has been observed for human milk oligosaccharides, with lactose as the common sugar, and in the raffinose-series plant oligosaccharides which are based on sucrose.

== Biological significance ==
Lacto-N-tetraose is considered a prebiotic, facilitating the growth of healthy bacteria in the gut microbiome. It is one of the first functional foods that the infant consumes. Because humans do not have the enzymes to cleave the glycosidic bonds of human milk oligosaccharides, these sugars have no caloric value and function as a dietary fiber in the intestine.

Only a small fraction of HMOs are absorbed undigested through the epithelium and are detectable in circulation, which may indicate other systemic functions of these compounds currently unknown. Lacto-N-tetraose and other human milk oligosaccharides are subsequently found excreted in the urine after consumption of human milk.

Lacto-N-tetraose in particular has been found to specifically promote growth of the species Bifidobacterium longum subspecies infantis. B. infantis aids in digestion and is considered "good" bacteria. Genetic studies of B. infantis has pinpointed a locus for HMO metabolism that is conserved across all strains observed to date. This suggests a possible co-evolution of the bacterium with the infant gut and composition of human milk.

Bifidobacterium have a metabolic pathway for the uptake and digestion of specific human milk oligosaccharides. This is accomplished through specific transporter proteins and glycosidases to cleave chemical bonds found in lacto-N-tetraose, lacto-N-neotetraose, and other human milk oligosaccharides. Cleavage of lacto-N-tetraose and lacto-N-neotetraose require different enzymes due to their distinct glycosidic bond at the non-reducing end. Bifidobacterium in the human intestine have been found to contain type I chain lacto-N-biosidases capable of cleaving lacto-N-tetraose to lactose-N-biose and lactose.

Lacto-N-tetraose is a non-competitive food source for B. infantis with other enteric bacteria lacking the required proteins and incapable of degrading the sugar into usable sources of carbon for glycolysis. When the infant consumes human milk, lacto-N-tetraose confers a growth advantage to Bifidobacterium as they are able to metabolize this sugar for ATP production whereas other gut bacteria cannot. This overgrowth of the healthy bacteria B. infantis may additionally hinder growth of other pathogenic bacteria in the gut.

Studies have indicated that only certain species of Bifidobacteria, such as those in the infant intestine, contain the lacto-N-biosidase gene. Analysis of Bifidobacteria in the gut of domestic animals found no evidence of this enzyme. Strains of B. infantis highly adapted to utilizing human milk oligosaccharides further suggests a selective co-evolution between the gut microbiome and infant.

It has been found that the gut microbiome of breast-fed versus formula-fed infants are vastly different. For this reason, adding HMOs to infant formulas is an area of interest.

== Methods of synthesis ==
Isolating single oligosaccharides is needed to further study their biological function. But human milk cannot be produced and studied in large amounts with current technology, and its complex makeup makes it difficult to chemically separate its individual molecular components. Synthesis of lacto-N-tetraose has been reported in total chemical synthesis as well as in recombinant Escherichia coli cells. The increasing availability of this compound is an area of ongoing research to further uncover the physiological and biochemical role of lacto-N-tetraose and other human milk oligosaccharides in the body.
