= Akkermansia glycaniphila =

Scientific classification
- Domain: Bacteria
- Kingdom: Pseudomonadati
- Phylum: Verrucomicrobiota
- Class: Verrucomicrobiia
- Order: Verrucomicrobiales
- Family: Akkermansiaceae
- Genus: Akkermansia
- Species: A. glycaniphila

Binomial name
- Akkermansia glycaniphila Ouwerkerk et al. 2016

Species of bacterium

Akkermansia glycanphila is a species of intestinal mucin-degrading bacterium. It was first isolated from reticulated python (Malayopython reticulatus) feces in 2016.

== Etymology ==
The genus was named for Antoon DL Akkermans (1940–2006), a Dutch microbiologist recognized for his contribution to microbial ecology, and the epithet from the New Latin and Greek meaning "glycan-loving".

== Biology and biochemistry ==
Akkermansia glycaniphila, like, A. muciniphila is Gram-negative, strictly anaerobic, non-motile, non-spore-forming, oval-shaped bacterium. The typestrain is Pyt^{T} (=DSM100705^{T}=CIP 110913^{T}). A. glycaniphila is able to use mucin as its sole source of carbon and nitrogen. It is culturable under the same conditions as A. muciniphilia, (anaerobic conditions on medium containing gastric mucin). When grown on soft agar mucin medium, colonies appear white with a diameter of 0.7mm. The long axis of single cells is 0.6–1.0 μm. Cells are covered with filaments, and occur singly, in pairs, in short chains and in aggregates.

The bacterial genome of A. glucaniphila Pyt^{T} is encoded on a single chromosome of 3,074,121 bp. The G+C content is 57.6% and contains 2,532 coding regions, all 21 tRNA genes, and three complete rRNA operons. For 72% (1,811) of the coding sequences, a function could be predicted. Genome analysis revealed the presence of many mucin-degrading enzymes, of which a number are predicted to be secreted: 54 glycoside hydrolases, one glycosyl hydrolase, seven sialidases, and three sulfatases. The Pyt^{T} genome is predicted to encode a cytochrome bd ubiquinol oxidase, indicating the potential for aerobic respiration.

The complete genome of A. glycaniphilia has been sequenced.

== Ecology ==
This bacterium probably inhabits oxic-anoxic interface of the intestinal mucin layer. This was demonstrated for A. muciniphila Muc^{T}. 16s rRNA gene amplicon sequencing reveals that the genus Akkermansia have been detected in animals with a wide variety of GI tract anatomy (foregut, hindgut, or simple) and in diet (from herbivores to omnivores and carnivores). It has been found in mammals both wild and domesticated, and in non-mammals like birds, fish and reptiles like the Burmese python. Mucin types, and the glycan types expressed, vary between these organisms, but mucus is a consistent feature of their intestinal tracts. It may be that mucus-colonizing microbes have a role in protecting the host against intestinal pathogens and contribute to restoration of the microbiota.
