= Akkermansia massiliensis =

Scientific classification
- Domain: Bacteria
- Kingdom: Pseudomonadati
- Phylum: Verrucomicrobiota
- Class: Verrucomicrobiia
- Order: Verrucomicrobiales
- Family: Akkermansiaceae
- Genus: Akkermansia
- Species: A. massiliensis

Binomial name
- Akkermansia massiliensis Ndongo et al. 2025

Species of bacterium

Akkermansia massiliensis is an obligately anaerobic, Gram-negative, motile species of bacteria in the human gut microbiome. The bacterium is non-spore-forming and cells are rod-shaped. The type strain is Marseille-P6666T (= CSUR P6666 = CECT 30548). The species is named for the city of Marseille, where it was first isolated from human feces in 2022.

== Role in the human gut microbiome ==
Akkermansia massiliensis is the second most prevalent species of Akkermansia in the human gut microbiome, after A. municiphila. A. massiliensis has been shown to degrade extracellular ATP in the gut, which reduces inflammation. In addition, A. massiliensis has been shown to produce agmatine at a higher rate than other Akkermansia species. A. massiliensis is tolerant to bile and gastric juice pH conditions. When rats were exposed to high levels of A. massiliensis, no negative consequences were seen and there was no evidence of virulence.

== Interaction with multiple sclerosis ==
There is some evidence that low levels of A. massiliensis in the human gut microbiome is correlated with a higher incidence of multiple sclerosis (MS).
