= BioNeutra =

Agricultural biotech company

BioNeutra North America, Inc. is a Canada-based agri-biotechnology manufacturer of patented technology to produce the food ingredients and natural fibre sweeteners, Isomaltooligosaccharide (IMO) and Fructooligosaccharide (FOS). BioNeutra is the first company to have received US Food and Drug Administration (FDA) and Health Canada approval for the manufacturing of IMO in North America.

== Overview ==
BioNeutra was established in 2003, by a group of scientists in Edmonton, Alberta, Canada. In addition to their headquarters, the company has a state-of-the-art pilot plant in Edmonton, which is actively involved in the research and development of health and functional food ingredients. In 2011, results of additional efficacy related research were published by University of Alberta, regarding the prebiotic effect of Isomaltooligosaccharide in animal models.

The core process technologies enable the manufacture of Isomaltooligosaccharide, as a natural fibre sweetener throughout the realm of human food ingredients, and health and nutrition applications from any starch source (cereal or pulse crops). IMO is available alone or blended with variety of natural or artificial high-intensity sweeteners which could be replaced with sucrose in one-to-one ratio.
