= 2'-Fucosyllactose =

2′-Fucosyllactose

Names
- IUPAC name α-L-Fucopyranosyl-(1→2)-β-D-galactopyranosyl-(1→4)-D-glucose
- Systematic IUPAC name (2R,3R,4R,5R)-4-{[(2S,3R,4S,5R,6R)-4,5-Dihydroxy-6-(hydroxymethyl)-3-{[(2S,3S,4R,5S,6S)-3,4,5-trihydroxy-6-methyloxan-2-yl]oxy}oxan-2-yl]oxy}-2,3,5,6-tetrahydroxyhexanal
- Other names 2′-FL

Identifiers
CAS Number	41263-94-9
3D model (JSmol)	Interactive image
ChEBI	CHEBI:147155
ChemSpider	149055
KEGG	G00268
PubChem CID	170484
UNII	XO2533XO8R
CompTox Dashboard (EPA)	DTXSID40194179
- InChI: InChI=1S/C18H32O15/c1-5-9(24)12(27)14(29)17(30-5)33-16-13(28)11(26)8(4-21)31-18(16)32-15(7(23)3-20)10(25)6(22)2-19/h2,5-18,20-29H,3-4H2,1H3/t5-,6-,7+,8+,9+,10+,11-,12+,13-,14-,15+,16+,17-,18-/m0/s1 Key: HWHQUWQCBPAQQH-BWRPKUOHSA-N
- SMILES: C[C@@H]1O[C@@H](O[C@H]2[C@H](O[C@H]([C@H](O)CO)[C@H](O)[C@@H](O)C=O)O[C@H](CO)[C@H](O)[C@@H]2O)[C@@H](O)[C@H](O)[C@@H]1O

Properties
Chemical formula	C_{18}H_{32}O_{15}
Molar mass	488.439 g·mol^{−1}
Density	1.681 g/cm^{3}
Solubility in water	240.0 g/L (in water)
Acidity (pK_{a})	11.9
- Except where otherwise noted, data are given for materials in their standard state (at 25 °C [77 °F], 100 kPa). Infobox references

2′-Fucosyllactose (2′-FL) is a fucosylated neutral trisaccharide composed of L-fucose, D-galactose, and D-glucose units. It is the most prevalent human milk oligosaccharide (HMO) naturally present in human breast milk, making up about 30% of all of HMOs. It was first discovered in the 1950s in human milk. The oligosaccharide's primary isolation technique has been in use since 1972.

== Structure ==
2′-FL consists of an L-fucose monomer in the α stereochemical configuration linked at the first carbon to a monomer of D-galactose in the β stereochemical configuration at the second carbon, which is in turn linked at the first carbon to a monomer of D-glucose (which may be in either the α or β configuration) at the fourth carbon.

== Production ==
The compound may be biosynthesized in quantity using E. coli.

== Metabolism ==
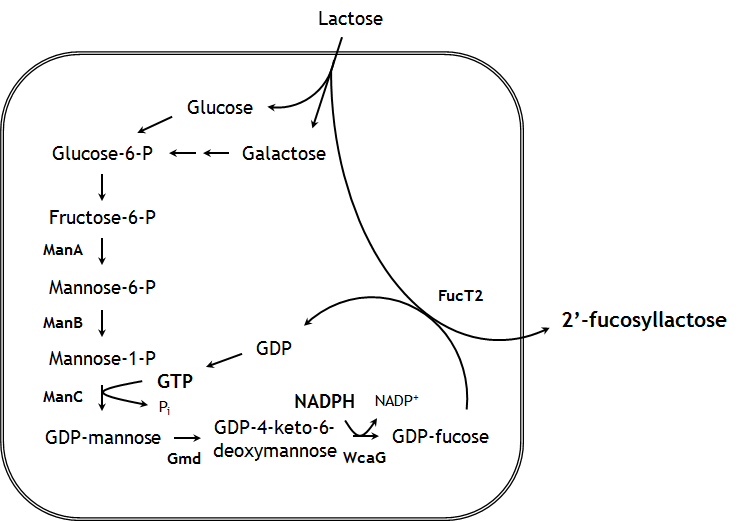
The metabolic pathway for GDP--fucose and 2′-fucosyllactose (2-FL) biosynthesis in recombinant E. coli.

Human systemic metabolism of intact 2'-FL is limited. Like other HMOs, it is resistant to human digestive enzymes in the upper gut, meaning it reaches the colon relatively intact.

The key site of 2'-FL metabolism is the intestinal microbiome. First, fucose is cleaved by α-fucosidases produced by gut bacteria such as Bifidobacterium spp. and Akkermansia spp.. The remaining lactose moiety is processed by β-galactosidases and other glycosidases.

Further microbial fermentation results in short-chain fatty acids, such as acetate, as well as lactate, 1,2-propanediol, and butyrate.

== Uses ==
As with many other oligosaccharides, a characteristic of 2′-FL is its ability to protect against infectious diseases by preventing epithelial-level adhesion of toxins and pathogens. 2′-FL stimulates the growth of certain bifidobacteria and upregulation of receptors which collectively lend to toxic and pathogenic protection; this is most prevalent in infants. Among the pathogens that 2′-FL is known to protect against are Campylobacter jejuni, Salmonella enterica (serotype Typhimurium), and Helicobacter pylori.
