= Molkosan =

- Product type: Prebiotics
- Current owner: A.Vogel
- Country: Switzerland
- Website: www.avogel.co.uk/food/products/molkosan-digestion/

Molkosan
Nutritional value per 100 g (3.5 oz)
- Energy: 42 kJ (10 kcal)
- Carbohydrates: 1 g
- Sugars: 5 g
- Dietary fibre: 0 g
- Fat: 0 g
- Protein: 0 g
Vitamins and minerals
| Vitamins | Quantity %DV^{†} |
| Vitamin A equiv. | 0% 0 μg |
| Vitamin C | 0% 0 mg |
| Minerals | Quantity %DV^{†} |
| Iron | 4% 0.7 mg |
| Sodium | 0% 10 mg |
- ^{†}Percentages estimated using US recommendations for adults.

Molkosan is the brand name of a fermented prebiotic organic whey product made from organic milk from Swiss cows in Switzerland by A.Vogel. It contains lactic acid.

A study at University of Aberdeen, UK shows that daily fermented whey consumption alters the fecal short-chain fatty acid profile in healthy adults.

== History ==
Molkosan is first mentioned in literature in 1913.

Alfred Vogel founded the company Bioforce in 1963 in Appenzell.

== See also ==
- Digestion
- Gut microbiota
- Lactic acid
