= Sucrose:sucrose fructosyltransferase =

Class of enzymes

Sucrose 1F-fructosyltransferase

Identifiers
- EC no.: 2.4.1.99
- CAS no.: 73379-56-3

Databases
- IntEnz: IntEnz view
- BRENDA: BRENDA entry
- ExPASy: NiceZyme view
- KEGG: KEGG entry
- MetaCyc: metabolic pathway
- PRIAM: profile
- PDB structures: RCSB PDB PDBe PDBsum
- Gene Ontology: AmiGO / QuickGO
Search
- PMC: articles
- PubMed: articles
- NCBI: proteins

Sucrose:sucrose fructosyltransferase (EC 2.4.1.99) is an enzyme that catalyzes the chemical reaction

2
sucrose
D-glucose
+
1-kestose

The enzyme converts two units of its substrate, sucrose, into D-glucose and the trisaccharide, 1-kestose. It has been characterised from onion (Allium cepa) and tall fescue (Lolium arundinaceum). The product is a fructooligosaccharide.

This enzyme belongs to the family of glycosyltransferases, specifically the hexosyltransferases. The systematic name of this enzyme class is sucrose:sucrose 1'-beta-D-fructosyltransferase. Other names in common use include SST, sucrose:sucrose 1-fructosyltransferase, sucrose-sucrose 1-fructosyltransferase, sucrose 1F-fructosyltransferase, and sucrose:sucrose 1F-beta-D-fructosyltransferase.
