= Xylooligosaccharide =

Polymer of the sugar xylose

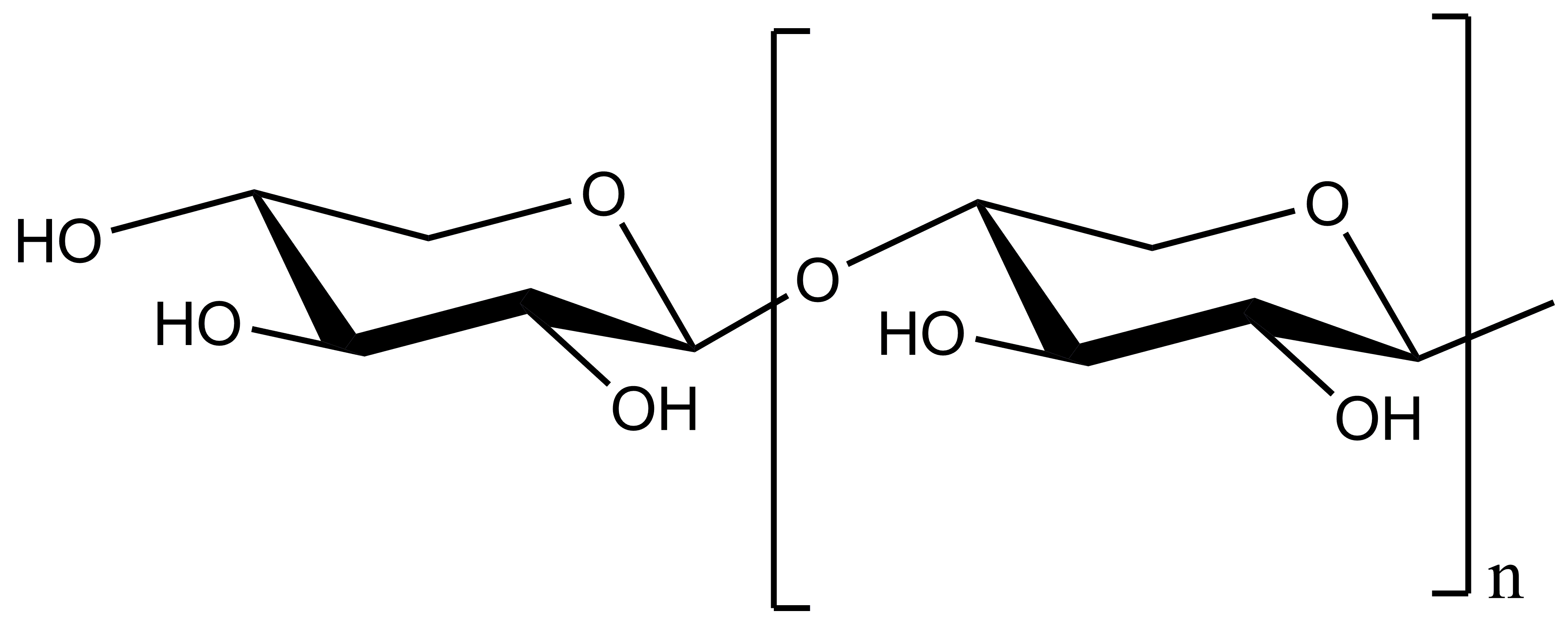
Molecular structure of an hypothetical xylooligosaccharide, where n is a variable number of xylose units such as xylobiose and xylotriose.

Xylooligosaccharides (XOS) are polymers of the sugar xylose. They are produced from the xylan fraction in plant fiber. Their C5 (where C is a quantity of carbon atoms in each monomer) structure is fundamentally different from other prebiotics, which are based upon C6 sugars. Xylooligosaccharides have been commercially available since the 1980s, originally produced by Suntory in Japan. They have more recently become more widely available commercially, as technologies have advanced and production costs have fallen. Some enzymes from yeast can exclusively convert xylan into only xylooligosaccharides-DP-3 to 7.

Xylooligosaccharides act as a prebiotic, selectively feeding beneficial bacteria such as bifidobacteria and lactobacilli within the digestive tract. A large number of clinical trials have been conducted with XOS, demonstrating a variety of health benefits, including improvements in blood sugars and lipids, digestive health benefits, laxation, and beneficial changes to immune markers. Canadian food regulations allow 1.4-8 gram per day orally administered XOS to be claimed as prebiotic, lower than that of prebiotics inulin (5-15 gram per day) or fructooligosaccharides (2.5-15 gram per day), based on their review of academic literature. There is no general regulatory approval of health claims for xylooligosaccharides, for example the European Food Safety Authority stated that "Increasing numbers of gastro-intestinal microorganisms is not established as beneficial physiological effect".

== See also ==
- OroFructooligosaccharide – Oligosaccharide fructans (FOS)
- Galactooligosaccharide – Class of prebiotics (GOS)
- Isomaltooligosaccharide – Mixture of short-chain carbohydrates (IMO)

== Bibliography ==
- Chung, Y-C; Hsu, C-K; Ko, C-Y; Chan, Y-C (2007). "Dietary intake of xylooligosaccharides improves the intestinal microbiota, fecal moisture, and pH value in the elderly". Nutr Res. 27 (12): 756–61. doi:10.1016/j.nutres.2007.09.014.
- Childs, CE; Roytio, H; Alhoniemi, E; Fekete, AA; Forssten, SD; Hudjec, N; et al. (2014). ""Xylo-oligosaccharides alone or in synbiotic combination with Bifidobacterium animalis subsp. lactis induce bifidogenesis and modulate markers of immune function in healthy adults " a double-blind, placebo-controlled, randomised, factorial cross-over study". Br J Nutr. 111 (11): 1945–56. doi:10.1017/S0007114513004261. PMID 24661576. S2CID 28575826.
- Cloetens, L; Broekaert, WF; Delaedt, Y; Ollevier, F; Courtin, CM; Delcour, JA; et al. (2010). ""Tolerance of arabinoxylan-oligosaccharides and their prebiotic activity in healthy subjects " a randomised, placebo-controlled cross-over study". Br J Nutr. 103 (5): 703–13. doi:10.1017/S0007114509992248. PMID 20003568.
- Finegold, SM; Li, Z; Summanen, PH; Downes, J; Thames, G; Corbett, K; et al. (2014). "Xylooligosaccharide increases bifidobacteria but not lactobacilli in human gut microbiota". Food Funct. 5 (3): 436–45. doi:10.1039/c3fo60348b. PMID 24513849.
- Francois, IEJA; Lescroart, O; Veraverbeke, WS; Marzorati, M; Possemiers, S; Evenepoel, P; et al. (2012). ""Effects of a wheat bran extract containing arabinoxylan oligosaccharides on gastrointestinal health parameters in healthy adult human volunteers " a double-blind, randomised, placebo-controlled, cross-over trial". Br J Nutr. 108 (12): 2229–42. doi:10.1017/S0007114512000372. hdl:1854/LU-3140491. PMID 22370444. S2CID 10359052.
- Iino, T; Nishijima, Y; Sawada, S; Sasaki, H; Harada, H; Suwa, Y; et al. (1997). "Improvement of Constipation by a Small Amount of Xylooligosaccharides Ingestion in Adult Women". J Japanese Assoc Diet Fiber Res. 1: 19–24. doi:10.11217/jjdf1997.1.19.
- Kajihara, M; Kato, S; Konishi, M; Yamagishi, Y; Horie, Y; Ishii, H (2000). "Xylooligosaccharide decreases blood ammonia levels in patients with liver cirrhosis". Am J Gastroenterol. 95 (9): 2514. doi:10.1111/j.1572-0241.2000.02712.x. S2CID 33589050.
- Lecerf, J-M; Depeint, F; Clerc, E; Dugenet, Y; Niamba, CN; Rhazi, L; et al. (2012). "Xylo-oligosaccharide (XOS) in combination with inulin modulates both the intestinal environment and immune status in healthy subjects, while XOS alone only shows prebiotic properties". Br J Nutr. 108 (10): 1847–58. Bibcode:2012BrJN..108.1847L. doi:10.1017/S0007114511007252. PMID 22264499.
- Lin, S-H; Chou, L-M; Chien, Y-W; Chang, J-S; Lin, C-I (2016). "Prebiotic Effects of Xylooligosaccharides on the Improvement of Microbiota Balance in Human Subjects". Gastroenterol Res Pract. 6: 1–6. doi:10.1155/2016/5789232. PMC 5019895. PMID 27651791.
- Maki, KC; Gibson, GR; Dickmann, RS; Kendall, CWC; Chen, C-YO; Costabile, A; et al. (2012). "Digestive and physiologic effects of a wheat bran extract, arabino-xylan-oligosaccharide, in breakfast cereal". Nutrition. 28 (11–12): 1115–21. doi:10.1016/j.nut.2012.02.010. PMID 22771050.
- Na, MH; Kim, WK (2007). "Effects of xylooligosaccharide intake on fecal Bifidobacteria, lactic acid and lipid metabolism in Korean young women". Kor J Nutr. 40: 154–61. doi:10.1097/01.NPT.0000288316.43613.63.
- Sheu, WH-H; Lee, I-T; Chen, W; Chan, Y-C (2008). "Effects of xylooligosaccharides in type 2 diabetes mellitus". J Nutr Sci Vitaminol (Tokyo). 54 (5): 396–401. doi:10.3177/jnsv.54.396. PMID 19001772.
- Tateyama, I; Hashii, K; Johno, I; Iino, T; Hirai, K; Suwa, Y; et al. (2005). "Effect of xylooligosaccharide intake on severe constipation in pregnant women". J Nutr Sci Vitaminol (Tokyo). 51 (6): 445–8. doi:10.3177/jnsv.51.445. PMID 16521705. S2CID 45484490.
- Yang, J; Summanen, PH; Henning, SM; Hsu, M; Lam, H; Huang, J; et al. (2015). ""Xylooligosaccharide supplementation alters gut bacteria in both healthy and prediabetic adults " a pilot study". Front Physiol. 6: 216. doi:10.3389/fphys.2015.00216. PMC 4528259. PMID 26300782.
