= Quest Nutrition =

American food company

- Type: Subsidiary
- Industry: High-protein foods
- Founded: 2010; 16 years ago
- Founders: Tom Bilyeu; Mike Osborn; Ron Penna
- Headquarters: El Segundo, California, U.S.
- Revenue: $345 million (2019)
- Parent: The Simply Good Foods Company
- Website: questnutrition.com

Quest Nutrition is an American food company that specializes in protein bars, protein chips, protein shakes, protein powder, and various other high-protein foods. It was founded by Tom Bilyeu, Mike Osborn, and Ron Penna in 2010. In 2019, it was acquired by The Simply Good Foods Company, the parent company of Atkins Nutritionals.

== History ==
Quest Nutrition was founded in 2010 in El Segundo, California, by Tom Bilyeu, Mike Osborn, and Ron Penna, who had recently sold their data loss prevention software company Awareness Technologies. Inspired in part by obesity in Bilyeu's family, Quest aimed to create protein bars and other high-protein snacks with no added sugar. Their first product was a protein bar based on a recipe developed by Penna's wife Shannan Penna, who was a fitness trainer at the time.

Quest grew rapidly in its first few years, becoming the second fastest-growing private company in the United States in 2014, with over 57,000% three-year revenue growth according to Inc. magazine. The company's growth was largely driven by influencer marketing, sending free protein bars to fitness influencers with large followings on social media; as Bilyeu explained, "People with six packs are walking billboards." The company was bootstrapped for its first five years before accepting a minority stake investment from private equity firm VMG Partners in 2015, valuing Quest Nutrition at $900 million.

Bilyeu left the company in October 2016 to launch the media company Impact Theory with his wife Lisa Bilyeu. In 2017, Quest underwent restructuring, closing two Los Angeles manufacturing sites, laying off 524 factory workers, and outsourcing their production and distribution to third parties.

On August 22, 2019, Quest was acquired by The Simply Good Foods Company, the parent company of diet brand Atkins Nutritionals, in a $1 billion all-cash deal.

== Products ==
Quest Nutrition is best known for their protein bars, available in a variety of flavors including best-sellers Chocolate Chip Cookie Dough, Birthday Cake, and Chocolate Chip. The company also offers a wide variety of other high-protein items, including high protein chips, cookies, chips, crackers, candy, and frozen pizza, as well as protein powder and protein shakes. Quest products are known for being high protein, while minimizing sugar and net carbs.

Quest's protein bars derive their protein from whey protein isolate and milk protein isolate. Their products are sweetened with sugar substitutes including stevia, erythritol, sucralose, which are lower in calories than other refined sugars. Quest was the first major adopter of allulose as a low-calorie alternative sweetener, which they used in select protein bars as of 2019. Quest's protein bars are gluten-free.

== Reception ==
In 2012 and 2013, health and nutrition retailer GNC named Quest's protein bars the best on the market. The company received criticism in 2014 for its use of the dietary fiber source isomaltooligosaccharide in protein bars, which can cause indigestion for some people, which led the company to replace the ingredient with corn-soluble fiber in 2016. The change prompted criticism of the protein bars' flavor, causing a sharp decrease in sales and leading the company to further reformulate the recipe later that year.

In a 2024 list of "The Best Protein Bars You’ll Actually Want to Eat", Elaheh Nozari and Megan Wahn of Bon Appétit named Quest's protein bars "The Most Filling Protein Bar", pointing to their higher protein contents than competitors and remarking that they "will remind you of the three-course chewing gum from Willy Wonka, because they taste freakishly like whatever food they’re trying to imitate." Glamour named Quest bars the best-tasting protein bars on the market in 2024.

In 2023, Eat This, Not That criticized Quest's protein powder for its use of cellulose, sucralose, and carrageenan, which may have negative effects on gut health. In a 2024 review for USA Today, Christian D'Andrea largely praised Quest's protein chips and crackers, while commenting that they sometimes struggle to mask the flavor of whey protein.

In 2024, Quest Strawberry Cake Frosted Cookies were a finalist for the "Most Innovative New Product" award at the Sweets & Snacks expo.
