= International Scientific Association for Probiotics and Prebiotics =

- Abbreviation: ISAPP
- Formation: February 2002; 24 years ago
- Founders: Glenn Gibson and Mary Ellen Sanders
- Founded at: New York
- Type: Nonprofit public service organization
- Legal status: 501(c)(3) organization
- Purpose: Gather together scientists working in the probiotic and prebiotic fields
- Location: Sacramento, California, United States
- Region served: Worldwide
- Services: Harmonization of scientific efforts
- Fields: Probiotics and prebiotics
- Executive Director: Marla Cunningham
- Website: isappscience.org

The International Scientific Association for Probiotics and Prebiotics (ISAPP) is an international non-profit organization dedicated to promoting the science behind probiotics and prebiotics. ISAPP participates in science-based written and oral communications and responds to emerging scientific issues regarding probiotics and prebiotics. The primary means through which ISAPP accomplishes its goals are annual meetings and follow up publications from that meeting.

In addition, ISAPP collaborates with a number of related organizations (such as the American Gastroenterological Association, World Gastroenterology Organisation, National Academies of Sciences, International Life Sciences Institute of Europe and ILSI-North America, Harvard Division of Nutrition, Food Chemicals Codex and the New York Academy of Sciences) on common goals, such as sponsorship of meetings, preparation of probiotic and prebiotic usage guidelines, or preparation of position papers.

The business of ISAPP is conducted by a board of directors, currently composed of 10 globally recognized, academic scientists. In addition, an Executive Director and a representative from the ISAPP Industry Advisory Committee (IAC) are non-voting members of the board. Its source of revenue is from companies whose membership dues earn them a seat on the IAC.

All ISAPP activities are focused on science, not promotion of specific products. Industry scientists are invited to contribute their scientific ideas and participate in conferences, but no group or commercial entity directs ISAPP.

== History ==
ISAPP was created in 2000 by a group of professional scientists at a Fermented Foods and Health Meeting in New York. This group recognized the lack of an organization that brought together the multidisciplinary scientists from fields such as microbiology, medicine, nutrition, food science, immunology, biochemistry and nutrition, who are conducting research on probiotics and prebiotics.

ISAPP was established as a 501(c)(3) organization in September 2002. ISAPP held 15 by-invitation annual meetings from 2002-2017, alternating between locations in Europe and North America. ISAPP hosted an open registration meeting in Singapore in 2018, its first meeting in Asia. Over 50 papers have been published under the auspices of ISAPP, in numerous peer reviewed journals. The ISAPP organization also prepared guidelines for probiotic and prebiotic scientific standards.

== Membership ==
ISAPP is a member based organization, composed of companies and organizations with an interest in probiotics and prebiotics (known as the Industry Advisory Committee). The primary benefit of IAC membership is to provide input to the Board of Directors on emerging issues related to the industry, topics to address at the annual meeting and the opportunity to send up to two representatives to the annual meeting. The companies participating in ISAPP's IAC include the most scientifically committed and advanced probiotic and prebiotic companies globally. Under the current organizational structure, there is no mechanism for individual membership in ISAPP. The organization is run by its board of directors guided by bylaws, not by voting of individual members. There is no structure for collection of individual dues and there is no official ISAPP scientific journal. A working list of interested scientists is maintained, and this list is used to disseminate information relevant to the fields of probiotics and prebiotics. A monthly ISAPP newsletter shares information about the organization's activities.

== Students and Fellows Association ==
In November 2009, the ISAPP Students and Fellows Association (ISAPP-SFA) was created to encourage graduate students and fellows conducting research in the probiotic and prebiotic fields an opportunity to interact with professionals in the field. The SFA functions to represent students and fellows to the board of directors of ISAPP as well as offer professional development opportunities to the members.

== Publications ==
A complete listing of articles written by ISAPP, commissioned by the organization, or produced after ISAPP annual meetings can be found on the ISAPP website.

The consensus article on Probiotics was written by ISAPP in 2014.

ISAPP also maintains an informational blog on the ISAPP website.
