= Lacto-N-biosidase =

Class of enzymes

Identifiers
- EC no.: 3.2.1.140
- CAS no.: 146359-52-6

Databases
- IntEnz: IntEnz view
- BRENDA: BRENDA entry
- ExPASy: NiceZyme view
- KEGG: KEGG entry
- MetaCyc: metabolic pathway
- PRIAM: profile
- PDB structures: RCSB PDB PDBe PDBsum
Search
- PMC: articles
- PubMed: articles
- NCBI: proteins

Lacto-N-biosidase (EC 3.2.1.140) is an enzyme with systematic name oligosaccharide lacto-N-biosylhydrolase. This enzyme catalyses the following chemical reaction

(1) beta-D-Gal-(1->3)-beta-D-GlcNAc-(1->3)-beta-D-Gal-(1->4)-D-Glc + H_{2}O $\rightleftharpoons$ beta-D-Gal-(1->3)-D-GlcNAc + beta-D-Gal-(1->4)-D-Glc
(2) lacto-N-tetraose + H_{2}O $\rightleftharpoons$ lacto-N-biose + lactose

The enzyme from Streptomyces specifically hydrolyses the terminal lacto-N-biosyl residue (beta-D-Gal-(1->3)-D-GlcNAc) from the non-reducing end of oligosaccharides with the structure beta-D-Gal-(1->3)-beta-D-GlcNAc-(1->3)-beta-D-Gal-(1->R).
