= Galactooligosaccharide =

Class of prebiotics

Identifiers
ChEBI	CHEBI:24151

Properties
Chemical formula	(C_{6}H_{10}O_{5})_{n}
Molar mass	Variable
- Except where otherwise noted, data are given for materials in their standard state (at 25 °C [77 °F], 100 kPa). Infobox references

Galactooligosaccharides (GOS), also known as oligogalactosyllactose, oligogalactose, oligolactose or transgalactooligosaccharides (TOS), belong to the group of prebiotics. Prebiotics are defined as non-digestible food ingredients that beneficially affect the host by stimulating the growth and/or activity of beneficial bacteria in the colon. GOS occurs in commercially available products such as food for both infants and adults.

== Chemistry ==
The composition of the galactooligosaccharide fraction varies in chain length and type of linkage between the monomer units. Galactooligosaccharides are produced through the enzymatic conversion of lactose, a component of bovine milk.

A range of factors come into play when determining the yield, style, and type of GOS produced. These factors include:

- enzyme source
- enzyme dosage
- feeding stock (lactose) concentration
- origins of the lactose
- process involved (e.g. free or immobilized enzyme)
- reaction conditions impacting the processing situation
- medium composition

GOS generally comprise a chain of galactose units that arise through consecutive transgalactosylation reactions, with a terminal glucose unit. However, where a terminal galactose unit is indicated, hydrolysis of GOS formed at an earlier stage in the process has occurred. The degree of polymerization of GOS can vary quite markedly, ranging from 2 to 8 monomeric units, depending mainly on the type of the enzyme used and the conversion degree of lactose.

== Digestion research ==
Because of the configuration of their glycosidic bonds, galactooligosaccharides largely resist hydrolysis by salivary and intestinal digestive enzymes. Galactooligosaccharides are classified as prebiotics, defined as non-digestible food ingredients as substrate for the host by stimulating the growth and activity of bacteria in the colon.

The increased activity of colonic bacteria results in various effects, both directly by the bacteria themselves or indirectly by producing short-chain fatty acids as byproducts via fermentation. Examples of effects are stimulation of immune functions, absorption of essential nutrients, and synthesis of certain vitamins.

=== Stimulating bacteria ===
Galactooligosaccharides are a substrate for bacteria, such as Akkermansia muciniphila, Bifidobacteria and lactobacilli. Studies with infants and adults have shown that foods or drinks enriched with galactooligosaccharides result in a significant increase in Bifidobacteria. These sugars can be found naturally in human milk, known as human milk oligosaccharides. Examples include lacto-N-tetraose, lacto-N-neotetraose, and lacto-N-fucopentaose.

=== Immune response ===
Human gut microbiota play a key role in the intestinal immune system. Galactooligosaccharides (GOS) support natural defenses of the human body via the gut microflora, indirectly by increasing the number of bacteria in the gut and inhibiting the binding or survival of Escherichia coli, Salmonella typhimurium and Clostridia. GOS can positively influence the immune system indirectly through the production of antimicrobial substances, reducing the proliferation of pathogenic bacteria.

=== Constipation ===
Constipation is a potential problem, particularly among infants, the elderly, and pregnant women. In infants, formula feeding may be associated with constipation and hard stools. Galactooligosaccharides may improve stool frequency and relieve symptoms related to constipation.

== See also ==
- Xylooligosaccharide (XOS)
