= Psychobiotic =

Microorganisms giving mental health effects

Psychobiotics is a term used in preliminary research to refer to live bacteria that, when ingested in appropriate amounts, might confer a mental health benefit by affecting microbiota of the host organism. Whether bacteria might play a role in the gut-brain axis is under research. A 2020 literature review suggests that the consumption of psychobiotics could be considered as a viable option to restore mental health although lacking randomized controlled trials on clear mental health outcomes in humans.

== Types ==
Fructans

In experimental probiotic psychobiotics, the bacteria most commonly used are Gram-positive bacteria, such as Bifidobacterium and Lactobacillus families, as these do not contain lipopolysaccharide chains, reducing the likelihood of an immunological response. Prebiotics are substances, such as fructans and oligosaccharides, that induce the growth or activity of beneficial microorganisms, such as bacteria on being fermented in the gut. Multiple bacterial species contained in a single probiotic broth is known as a polybiotic.

== Gut-brain axis ==
Psychobiotics are probiotics that influence the gut-brain axis, the bidirectional communication network linking the gastrointestinal system and the brain. By positively modulating the gut microbiota, psychobiotics can impact the production of neurotransmitters, reduce inflammation, and enhance neural signaling, which may improve mental health and alleviate symptoms of neurological disorders. This highlights their potential as a therapeutic tool for maintaining a healthy gut-brain connection.

== Research ==
A 2021 review showed that treating anxiety in young people with psychobiotics had no significant effect. This study highlights the gut microbiome's role in brain function and mental health is a growing research area, particularly during adolescence, a critical period for gut-brain axis development. This study systematically reviewed and analyzed the effects of psychobiotic interventions on anxiety in youth (ages 10–24). Among 5416 studies identified, 14 were reviewed, and 10 included in the meta-analysis, involving 617 participants. The results showed minimal efficacy of psychobiotics in reducing anxiety, with a pooled standard mean difference of −0.03, indicating no significant effect. Despite limited evidence, future research focusing on mechanisms, causality, and youth perspectives is essential for advancing psychobiotic use in mental health management.

Another 2022 article highlights how the nervous system disorders affect millions globally each year, sparking interest in the potential of probiotics to support the gut-brain axis alongside traditional treatments. Psychobiotics, a type of probiotic, have shown promise in improving gut microbiota and alleviating symptoms of central nervous system (CNS) disorders. This study reviewed their impact on conditions like autism spectrum disorders, Parkinson's disease, multiple sclerosis, depression, and insomnia, among others. The findings suggest that psychobiotic-containing functional foods could be an effective tool for improving mental health and managing CNS disorders.

There is a need for more diverse human studies, mainly because those that exist have contradictory outcomes.

=== Species ===
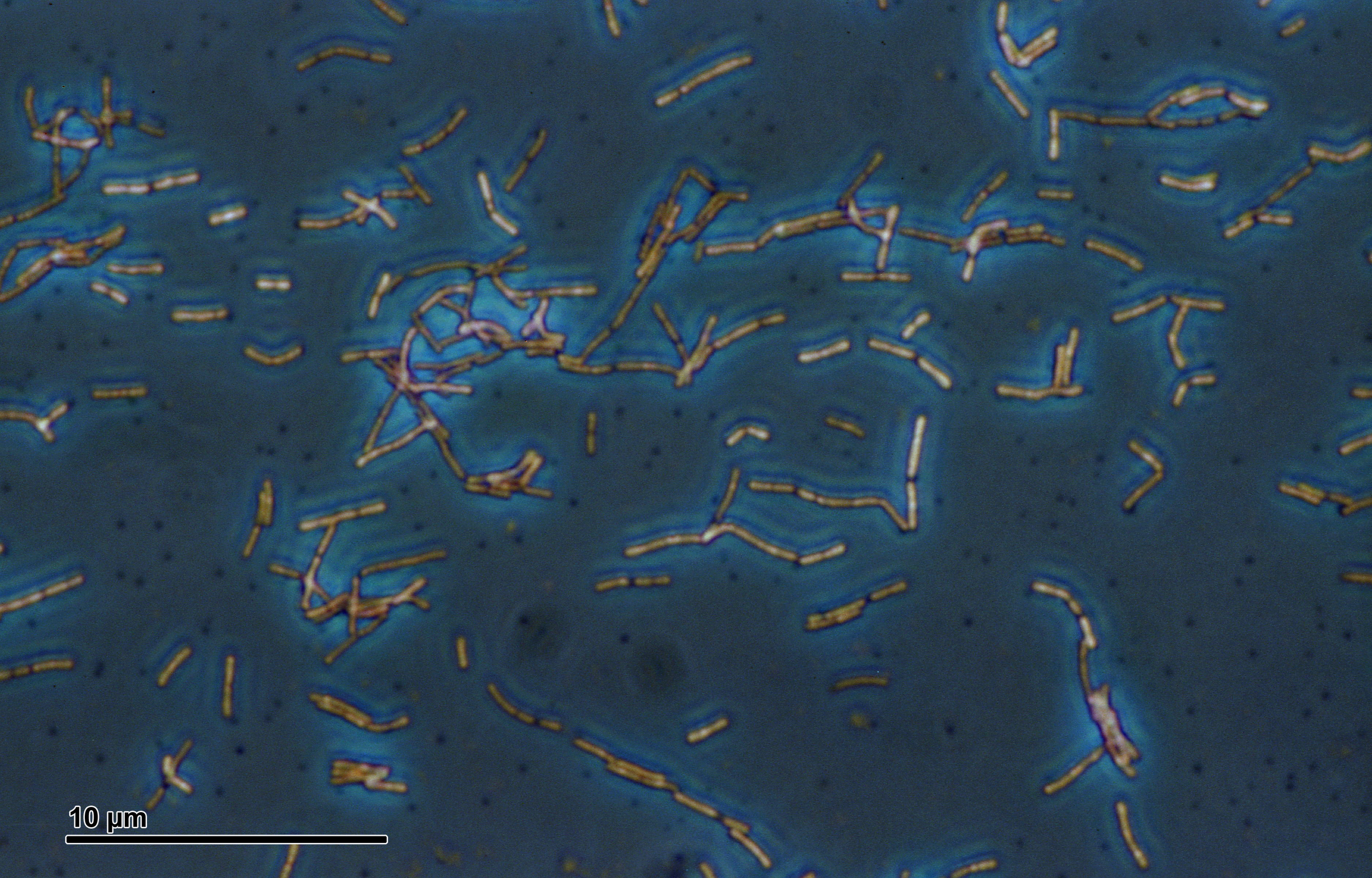
Lactobacillus acidophilus

Several species of bacteria have been used in probiotic psychobiotic research:

- Lactobacillus helveticus
- Bifidobacterium longum
- Lactobacillus casei
- Lactobacillus plantarum
- Lactobacillus acidophilus
- Lactobacillus delbrueckii subsp. bulgaricus
- Bifidobacterium breve
- Bifidobacterium infantis
- Streptococcus salivarius
- Lactobacillus rhamnosus
- Lactobacillus gasseri
