= Ubiquinol oxidase (H+-transporting) =

Ubiquinol oxidase (H^{+}-transporting)

Identifiers
- EC no.: 7.1.1.3

Databases
- IntEnz: IntEnz view
- BRENDA: BRENDA entry
- ExPASy: NiceZyme view
- KEGG: KEGG entry
- MetaCyc: metabolic pathway
- PRIAM: profile
- PDB structures: RCSB PDB PDBe PDBsum
Search
- PMC: articles
- PubMed: articles
- NCBI: proteins

Ubiquinol oxidase (H^{+}-transporting) (EC 7.1.1.3, cytochrome bb3 oxidase, cytochrome bo oxidase, cytochrome bd-I oxidase) is an enzyme with systematic name ubiquinol:O_{2} oxidoreductase (H^{+}-transporting). This enzyme catalyses the following chemical reaction

2 ubiquinol + O_{2} + n H^{+}in $\rightleftharpoons$ 2 ubiquinone + 2 H_{2}O + n H^{+}out

Ubiquinol oxidase contains a dinuclear centre comprising two hemes, or heme and copper.
