= Cycloisomaltooligosaccharide glucanotransferase =

Class of enzymes

Identifiers
- EC no.: 2.4.1.248

Databases
- IntEnz: IntEnz view
- BRENDA: BRENDA entry
- ExPASy: NiceZyme view
- KEGG: KEGG entry
- MetaCyc: metabolic pathway
- PRIAM: profile
- PDB structures: RCSB PDB PDBe PDBsum
Search
- PMC: articles
- PubMed: articles
- NCBI: proteins

Cycloisomaltooligosaccharide glucanotransferase (EC 2.4.1.248) is an enzyme with systematic name (1->6)-alpha-D-glucan:(1->6)-alpha-D-glucan 6-alpha-D-(1->6alpha-D-glucano)-transferase (cyclizing). This enzyme catalyses the following chemical reaction

cyclizes part of a (1->6)-alpha-D-glucan chain by formation of a (1->6)-alpha-D-glucosidic bond

This enzyme is specific for (1->6)-alpha-D-glucans (dextrans).
