= Human milk oligosaccharide =

Group of compounds

Human milk oligosaccharides (HMOs), also known as human milk glycans, are short polymers of simple sugars that can be found in high concentrations in human breast milk. Human milk oligosaccharides promote the development of the immune system, can reduce the risk of pathogen infections and improve brain development and cognition. The HMO profile of human breast milk shapes the gut microbiota of the infant by selectively stimulating bifidobacteria and other bacteria.

== Functions ==
Chemical structure of 2'-fucosyllactose consisting of lactose and fucose subunits

In contrast to the other components of breast milk that are absorbed by the infant through breastfeeding, HMOs are indigestible for the nursing child. However, they have a prebiotic effect and serve as food for intestinal bacteria, especially bifidobacteria. The dominance of these intestinal bacteria in the gut reduces the colonization with pathogenic bacteria (probiosis) and thereby promotes a healthy intestinal microbiota and reduces the risk of dangerous intestinal infections. Recent studies suggest that HMOs significantly lower the risk of viral and bacterial infections and thus diminish the chance of diarrhoea and respiratory diseases.

This protective function of the HMOs is activated when in contact with specific pathogens, such as certain bacteria or viruses. These have the ability to bind themselves to the glycan receptors (receptors for long chains of connected sugar molecules on the surface of human cells) located on the surface of the intestinal cells and can thereby infect the cells of the intestinal mucosa. Researchers have discovered that HMOs mimic these glycan receptors so the pathogens bind themselves to the HMOs rather than the intestinal cells. This reduces the risk of an infection with a pathogen. It has also been demonstrated that HMOs can bind to several intestinal viruses, such as norovirus and Norwalk virus, moreover they can reduce the virus load from influenza and RSV.

In addition to this, HMOs seem to influence the reaction of specific cells of the immune system in a way that reduces inflammatory responses. It is also suspected that HMOs reduce the risk of premature infants becoming infected with the potentially life-threatening disease necrotizing enterocolitis (NEC).

Some of the metabolites directly affect the nervous system or the brain and can sometimes influence the development and behavior of children in the long term. There are studies that indicate certain HMOs supply the child with sialic acid residues. Sialic acid is an essential nutrient for the development of the child's brain and mental abilities.

In experiments designed to test the suitability of HMOs as a prebiotic source of carbon for intestinal bacteria it was discovered that they are highly selective for a commensal bacteria known as Bifidobacteria longum biovar infantis. The presence of genes unique to B. infantis, including co-regulated glycosidases, and its efficiency at using HMOs as a carbon source may imply a co-evolution of HMOs and the genetic capability of select bacteria to utilize them.

== Occurrence ==
Milk oligosaccharides seem to be more abundant in humans than in other animals and to be more complex and varied. Oligosaccharides in primate milk are generally more complex and diverse than in non-primates.

Human milk oligosaccharides (HMOs) form the third most abundant solid component (dissolved or emulsified or suspended in water) of human milk, after lactose and fat. HMOs are present in a concentration of 11.3 – 17.7 g/L (1.5 oz/gal – 2.36 oz/gal) in human milk, depending on lactation stages. Approximately 200 structurally different human milk oligosaccharides are known, and they can be categorized into fucosylated, sialylated and neutral core HMOs. The composition of human milk oligosaccharides in breast milk is individual to each mother and varies over the period of lactation. The dominant oligosaccharide in 80% of all women is 2′-fucosyllactose, which is present in human breast milk at a concentration of approximately 2.5 g/L; other abundant oligosacchadies include lacto-N-tetraose, lacto-N-neotetraose, and lacto-N-fucopentaose. It has been found by numerous studies that the concentration of each individual human milk oligosaccharide changes throughout the different periods of lactation (colostrum, transitional, mature and late milk) and depend on various factors such as the mother's genetic secretor status and length of gestation.

Mean concentrations of the most abundant HMOs by lactation stage in [g/L] (pooled HMO means from 31 countries)
Abbreviation	Name	Colostrum (0–5 days)	Transitional (6–14 days)	Mature (15–90 days)	Late (>90 days)
2'FL	2'-Fucosyllactose	3.18	2.07	2.28	1.65
LNDFH-I	Lacto-N-difucohexaose I	1.03	1.06	1.10	0.87
LNFP-I	Lacto-N-fucopentaose I	0.83	1.11	0.83	0.41
LNFP-II	Lacto-N-fucopentaose II	0.78	0.33	0.78	0.27
LNT	Lacto-N-tetraose	0.73	1.07	0.74	0.64
3-FL	3-Fucosyllactose	0.72	0.59	0.72	0.92
6'-SL	6'-Sialyllactose	0.40	0.71	0.40	0.30
DSLNT	Disialyllacto-N-tetraose	0.38	0.67	0.38	0.22
LNnT	Lacto-N-neotetraose	0.37	0.47	0.37	0.19
DFL	Difucosyllactose	0.29	0.56	0.29	0.27
FDS-LNH	Fucosyldisialyllacto-N-hexaose I	0.28	N/A	0.29	0.12
LNFP-III	Lacto-N-fucopentaose III	0.26	0.37	0.26	0.23
3'SL	3'-Sialyllactose	0.19	0.13	0.19	0.13

== Applications ==
- Infant formula: Historically HMOs were not part of infant formula, and bottle-fed babies could not benefit from their positive health effects. However recently more and more HMOs, including 2'-Fucosyllactose and Lacto-N-neotetraose, are being added as supplements to modern infant formula. Recently an infant formula with a combination of 5 different HMOs (2′-fucosyllactose, 2′,3-di-fucosyllactose, lacto-N-tetraose, 3′-sialyllactose, and 6′-sialyllactose) was tested in a clinical trial with positive effects on gut microflora. Even this type of infant formula is far from the natural abundance of nearly 200 HMOs present in human milk.
- Irritable bowel syndrome: Human milk oligosaccharides are also used to treat the symptoms of irritable bowel syndrome (IBS), which is a gastrointestinal disorder affecting 10–15% of the developed world. A 12-week treatment with an orally taken HMO mixture (2'FL and LNnT) showed significant improvement of the life quality of IBS patients.

== Synthesis ==
=== Biosynthesis in humans ===
All HMOs derive from lactose, which can be decorated by four monosaccharides (N-acetyl-D-glucosamine, D-galactose, sialic acid and/or L-fucose) to form an oligosaccharide. The HMO variability in human mothers depend on two specific enzymes, the α1-2-fucosyltransferase (FUT2) and the α1-3/4-fucosyltransferase (FUT3). The milk of mothers with inactivated FUT2 enzyme do not contain α1-2-fucosylated HMOs, and likewise with inactivated FUT3 enzyme there can be almost no α1-4-fucasylated HMOs found. Typically 20% of the global population of mothers do not have active FUT2 enzyme, but still have an active FUT3 enzyme, whereas 1% of mothers express neither FUT2 nor FUT3 enzymes.

Milk groups according to Lewis and Secretor status
Milk group	Genetic classification	Lewis status (FUT3 enzyme presence)	Secretor status (FUT2 enzyme presence)	Main HMOs secreted	Estimated global frequency
1	Lewis positive, Secretor	Yes	Yes	2'FL, 3-FL, DFL, LNT, LNnT, LNFP-I, LNFP-II, LNDFH-I, LNDFH-II	70%
2	Lewis positive, Non-secretor	Yes	No	3-FL, LNT, LNnT, LNFP-II, LNFP-III, LNDFH-II	20%
3	Lewis negative, Secretor	No	Yes	2'FL, 3-FL, DFL, LNT, LNnT, LNFP-I, LNFP-III	9%
4	Lewis negative, Non-secretor	No	No	3-FL, LNT, LNnT, LNFP-III, LNFP-V	1%

=== Industrial large-scale synthesis ===
Human milk oligosaccharides can be synthesized in large quantities using precision industrial fermentation methods e.g. by the commonly used, non-pathogenic bacteria Escherichia coli. During the fermentation process the bacteria are fed with a carbon-source (e.g. glucose), salts, minerals and trace elements under aseptic conditions in a stainless steel bioreactor, while lactose is added to the process as precursor molecule. Bacteria are then converting the lactose into human milk oligosaccharides by decorating it with other sugar monomers. After the fermentation process the HMOs are completely separated from the bacteria, proteins and DNA using different filtration techniques. Subsequently the HMOs are purified, crystallized, dried, packaged and delivered to infant formula manufacturers where they are mixed with other components of infant formula.

=== Enzymatic synthesis ===
Enzymatic synthesis of HMOs through transgalactosylation is an efficient way for production. Various donors, including p-nitrophenyl-β-galactopyranoside, uridine diphosphate galactose and lactose, can be used in transgalactosylation. In particular, lactose may act as either a donor or an acceptor in a variety of enzymatic reactions and is available in large quantities from the whey produced as a co-processing product from cheese production. There is a lack of published data, however, describing the large-scale production of such galacto-oligosaccharides.
