= Fructooligosaccharide =

Oligosaccharide fructans

Fructooligosaccharide structure

Fructooligosaccharides (FOS) also sometimes called oligofructose or oligofructan, are oligosaccharide fructans, used as an alternative sweetener. FOS exhibits sweetness levels between 30 and 50 percent of sugar in commercially prepared syrups. It occurs naturally, and its commercial use emerged in the 1980s in response to demand for healthier and calorie-reduced foods.

== Chemistry ==
Two different classes of fructooligosaccharide (FOS) mixtures are produced commercially, based on inulin degradation or transfructosylation processes.

FOS can be produced by degradation of inulin, or polyfructose, a polymer of D-fructose residues linked by β(2→1) bonds with a terminal α(1→2) linked D-glucose. The degree of polymerization of inulin ranges from 10 to 60. Inulin can be degraded enzymatically or chemically to a mixture of oligosaccharides with the general structure Glu–Fru_{n} (abbrev. GF_{n}) and Fru_{m} (F_{m}), with n and m ranging from 1 to 7. This process also occurs to some extent in nature, and these oligosaccharides may be found in a large number of plants, especially in Jerusalem artichoke, chicory and the blue agave plant. The main components of commercial products are kestose (GF_{2}), nystose (GF_{3}), fructosylnystose (GF_{4}), bifurcose (GF_{3}), inulobiose (F_{2}), inulotriose (F_{3}), and inulotetraose (F_{4}).

The second class of FOS is prepared by the transfructosylation action of a β-fructosidase of Aspergillus niger or Aspergillus on sucrose. The resulting mixture has the general formula of GF_{n}, with n ranging from 1 to 5. Contrary to the inulin-derived FOS, not only is there β(1→2) binding but other linkages do occur, however, in limited numbers.

Because of the configuration of their glycosidic bonds, fructooligosaccharides resist hydrolysis by salivary and intestinal digestive enzymes. In the colon they are fermented by anaerobic bacteria. In other words, they have a lower caloric value, while contributing to the dietary fiber fraction of the diet. Fructooligosaccharides are more soluble than inulins and are, therefore, sometimes used as an additive to yogurt and other (dairy) products. Fructooligosaccharides are used specially in combination with high-intensity artificial sweeteners, whose sweetness profile and aftertaste it improves.

== Food sources ==
FOS is extracted from the blue agave plant as well as fruits and vegetables such as bananas, onions, chicory root, garlic, asparagus, jícama, and leeks. Some grains and cereals, such as wheat and barley, also contain FOS. The Jerusalem artichoke and its relative yacón together with the blue agave plant have been found to have the highest concentrations of FOS of cultured plants.

The enzyme sucrose:sucrose fructosyltransferase is responsible for the production of the smallest fructooligosaccharide, 1-kestose, directly from two units of sucrose in plants such as onion:

2
sucrose
D-glucose
+
1-kestose

== Health benefits ==
FOS has been a popular sweetener in Japan and Korea for many years, even before 1990, when the Japanese government installed a "Functionalized Food Study Committee" of 22 experts to start to regulate "special nutrition foods or functional foods" that contain the categories of fortified foods (e.g., vitamin-fortified wheat flour), and is now becoming increasingly popular in Western cultures for its prebiotic effects. FOS serves as a substrate for microflora in the large intestine, increasing the overall gastrointestinal tract health. It has also been proposed as a supplement for treating yeast infections.

Several studies have found that FOS and inulin promote calcium absorption in both the animal and the human gut. The intestinal microflora in the lower gut can ferment FOS, which results in a reduced pH. Calcium is more soluble in acid, and, therefore, more of it comes out of food and is available to move from the gut into the bloodstream.

In a randomized controlled trial involving 36 twin pairs aged 60 and above, participants were given either a prebiotic (3375 mg inulin and 3488 mg FOS) or a placebo daily for 12 weeks along with resistance exercise and branched-chain amino acid (BCAA) supplementation. The trial, conducted remotely, showed that the prebiotic supplement led to changes in the gut microbiome, specifically increasing Bifidobacterium abundance. While there was no significant difference in chair rise time between the prebiotic and placebo groups, the prebiotic did improve cognition. The study suggests that simple gut microbiome interventions could enhance cognitive function in the elderly.

FOS can be considered a small dietary fibre with (like all types of fibre) low caloric value. The fermentation of FOS results in the production of gases and short chain fatty acids. The latter provide some energy to the body.

== Side-effects ==
All inulin-type prebiotics, including FOS, are generally thought to stimulate the growth of Bifidobacteria species. Bifidobacteria are considered beneficial bacteria. This effect has not been uniformly found in all studies, either for Bifidobacteria or for other gut organisms. FOS are also fermented by numerous bacterial species in the intestine, including Klebsiella, E. coli and many Clostridium species, which can be pathogenic in the gut. These species are responsible mainly for the gas formation (hydrogen, carbon dioxide and methane), which results after ingestion of FOS. Studies have shown that up to 20 grams/day is well tolerated. FOS are not well tolerated in individuals with Irritable Bowel Syndrome (IBS) or with FODMAP sensitivity.

== Regulation ==
=== US FDA regulation ===
FOS is classified as generally recognized as safe (GRAS).

=== NZ FSANZ regulation ===
The Food Safety Authority warned parents of babies that a major European baby-formula brand made in New Zealand does not comply with local regulations (because it contains fructo-oligosaccharides (FOS)), and urged them to stop using it.

=== EU regulation ===
FOS use has been approved in the European Union; allowing addition of FOS in restricted amounts to baby formula (for babies up to 6 months) and follow-on formula (for babies between 6 and 12 months). Infant and follow-on formula products containing FOS have been sold in the EU since 1999.

=== Canadian regulations ===
FOS is currently not approved for use in baby formula.

== See also ==
- Xylooligosaccharide (XOS)
