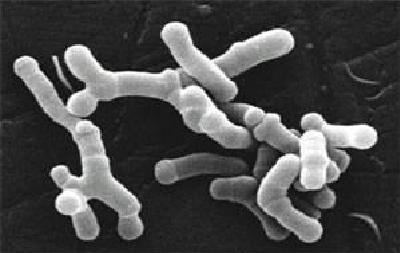

Scientific classification
- Domain: Bacteria
- Kingdom: Bacillati
- Phylum: Actinomycetota
- Class: Actinomycetes
- Order: Bifidobacteriales
- Family: Bifidobacteriaceae
- Genus: Bifidobacterium
- Species: B. longum

Binomial name
- Bifidobacterium longum Reuter 1963 (Approved Lists 1980)

= Bifidobacterium longum =

Species of bacterium

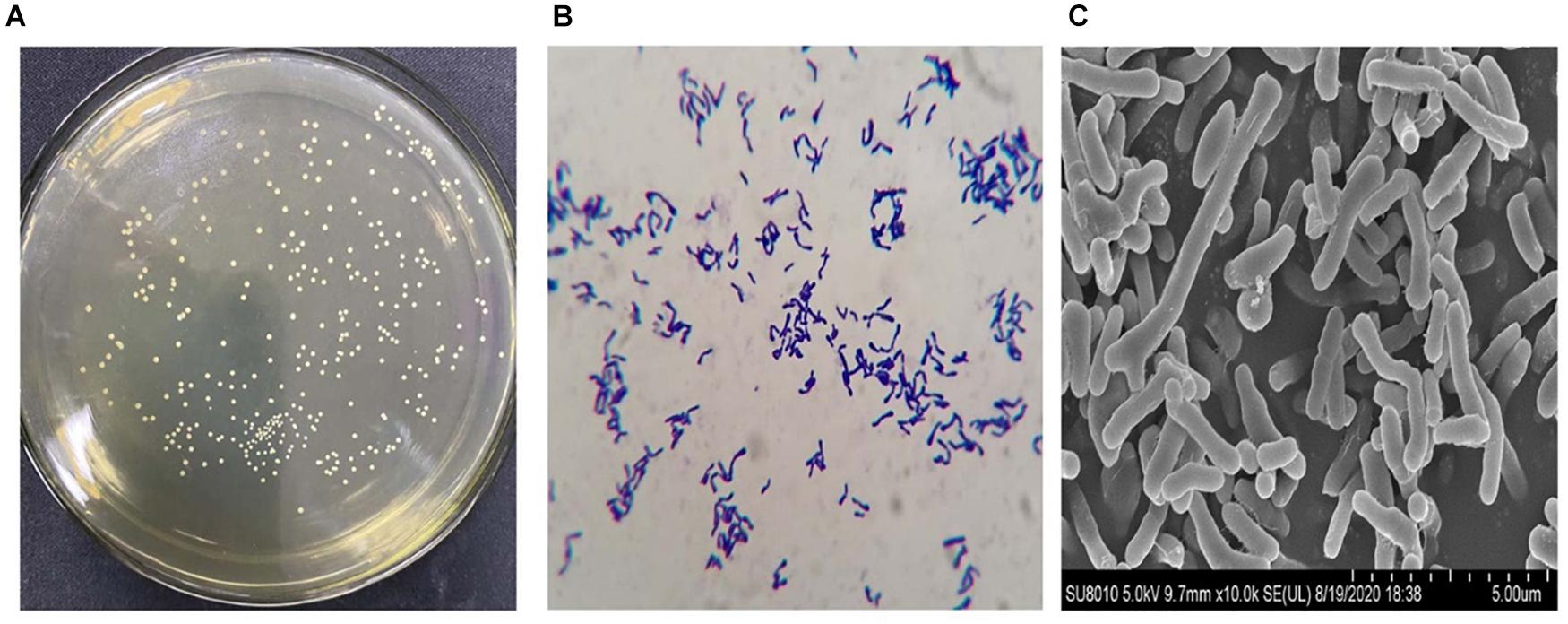
Representative morphologic characteristics of B. longum subsp. longum strains

Bifidobacterium longum is a Gram-positive, catalase-negative, rod-shaped bacterium present in the human gastrointestinal tract and one of the 32 species that belong to the genus Bifidobacterium. It is a microaerotolerant anaerobe and considered to be one of the earliest colonizers of the gastrointestinal tract of infants. When grown on general anaerobic medium, B. longum forms white, glossy colonies with a convex shape. B. longum is one of the most common bifidobacteria present in the gastrointestinal tracts of both children and adults. B. longum is non-pathogenic, is often added to food products, and its production of lactic acid is believed to prevent growth of pathogenic organisms.

== Classification ==
In 2002, three previously distinct species of Bifidobacterium, B. infantis, B. longum, and B. suis, were unified into a single species named B. longum with the biotypes infantis, longum, and suis, respectively. This occurred as the three species had extensive DNA similarity including a 16S rRNA gene sequence similarity greater than 97%. In addition, the three original species were phenotypically difficult to distinguish due to different carbohydrate fermentation patterns among strains of the same species. As probiotic activity varies among strains of B. longum, interest exists in the exact classification of new strains, although this is made difficult by the high gene similarity between the three biotypes. Currently, strain identification is done through polymerase chain reaction (PCR) on the subtly different 16S rRNA gene sequences.

=== Subspecies B. infantis ===
Bifidobacterium longum subsp. infantis (B. infantis) exists primarily in the intestine of breast-fed infants. B. infantis is unique in its ability to digest and consume human milk oligosaccharides (HMOs). Unlike the other subspecies, B. infantis contains a 43-kb gene cluster, or HMO Cluster I, that encodes transport proteins and glycolyl hydrolases that allow it to transport HMOs inside the cell and break them down completely.

The presence of B. infantis in the gut of infants proves to have many health benefits. It has a competitive advantage which results in less diversity in the infant gut microbiota and therefore fewer luminal pathogens. It also decreases intestinal permeability while increasing stability of tight junction proteins. It promotes the maturation of the innate immune response and promotes anti-inflammatory properties. Therefore, premature infants without B. infantis, have gut dysbiosis and an increased risk of necrotizing enterocolitis and late-onset sepsis. Currently, there is research on the use of probiotics with B. infantis for premature infants.

== Environment ==
B. longum colonizes the human gastrointestinal tract, where it, along with other Bifidobacterium species, represents up to 90% of the bacteria of an infant's gastrointestinal tract. This number gradually drops to 3% in an adult's gastrointestinal tract as other enteric bacteria such as Bacteroides and Eubacterium begin to dominate. Some strains of B. longum were found to have high tolerance for gastric acid and bile, suggesting that these strains would be able to survive the gastrointestinal tract to colonize the lower small and large intestines. The persistence of B. longum in the gut is attributed to the glycoprotein-binding fimbriae structures and bacterial polysaccharides, the latter of which possess strong electrostatic charges that aid in the adhesion of B. longum to intestinal endothelial cells. This adhesion is also enhanced by the fatty acids in the lipoteichoic acid of the B. longum cell wall.

== Metabolism ==
B. longum is considered to be a scavenger, possessing multiple catabolic pathways to use a large variety of nutrients to increase its competitiveness among the gut microbiota. Up to 19 types of permease exist to transport various carbohydrates with 13 being ATP-binding cassette transporters. B. longum has several glycosyl hydrolases to metabolise complex oligosaccharides for carbon and energy. This is necessary as mono- and disaccharides have usually been consumed by the time they reach the lower gastrointestinal tract where B. longum resides. In addition, B. longum can uniquely ferment galactomannan-rich natural gum using glucosaminidases and alpha-mannosidases that participate in the fermentation of glucosamine and mannose, respectively. The high number of genes associated with oligosaccharide metabolism is a result of gene duplication and horizontal gene transfer, indicating that B. longum is under selective pressure to increase its capability to compete for various substrates in the gastrointestinal tract.

Furthermore, B. longum possesses hydrolases, deaminases, and dehydratases to ferment amino acids. B. longum also has bile salt hydrolases to hydrolyze bile salts into amino acids and bile acids. The function of this is not clear, although B. longum could use the amino acids products to better tolerate bile salts.

Among six tested strains of Bifidobacterium from human gut, only B. longum biotype infantis demonstrated significant growth on human milk oligosaccharides as the sole carbon source.

== Pathogenesis ==
A number of cases of B. longum infection have been reported in the scientific literature. These are primarily cases in preterm infants that are undergoing probiotic treatment, although there are also reports of infection in adults. Infection in preterm infants manifests as bacteremia or necrotizing enterocolitis, while in adults there have been reports of sepsis and peritonitis.

== Research on beneficial properties ==
Along with B. adolescentis, B. longum has been found at relatively high levels in the GI tracts of healthy humans. Numerous strains have been described, including several whose genomes have been completely sequenced, such as B. longum subsp. longum BBMN68, KACC 91563, GT15, NCIMB 8809, W11, Jih1, JCM7052, BCBL-583, and iVE-15, and B. longum subsp. infantis ATCC15697, CECT 7210, B2-01, and YLGB-1496. From animal models or clinical trials, various B. longum strains have been demonstrated to improve migraine symptoms, respiratory illness, pollen allergies, assorted gastrointestinal issues, blood sugar and triglyceride levels, cognitive parameters, and immunological protection.

== See also ==
- Psychobiotic
- Probiotic
- Gut flora
- Microorganism
