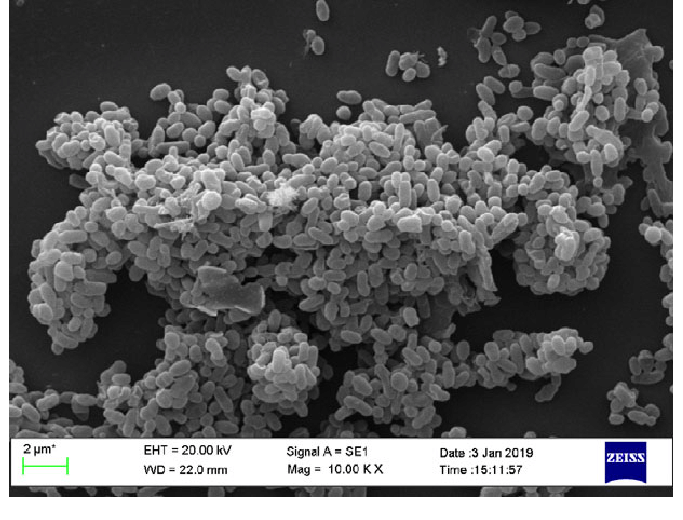
- Scanning electron micrograph of Akkermansia muciniphila

Scientific classification
- Domain: Bacteria
- Kingdom: Pseudomonadati
- Phylum: Verrucomicrobiota
- Class: Verrucomicrobiia
- Order: Verrucomicrobiales
- Family: Akkermansiaceae
- Genus: Akkermansia
- Species: A. muciniphila

Binomial name
- Akkermansia muciniphila Derrien et al. 2004

= Akkermansia muciniphila =

Species of bacterium

Akkermansia muciniphila is a human intestinal symbiont, isolated from human feces. It is a mucin-degrading bacterium belonging to the genus Akkermansia, discovered in 2004 by Muriel Derrien and Willem de Vos at Wageningen University of the Netherlands. It belongs to the phylum Verrucomicrobiota and its type strain is Muc^{T} (=ATCC BAA-835^{T} =CIP 107961^{T}). It is under preliminary research for its potential beneficial associations with metabolic disorders.

== Morphology ==
Akkermansia muciniphila is a Gram-negative, strictly anaerobic, non-motile, non-spore-forming, oval bacterium.

== Structure of LOS ==
The lipopolysaccharide (LPS) of A. muciniphila has been found to lack the O-antigen unit, making it a lipooligosaccharide (LOS), also known as rough-type LPS.

The LOS of A. muciniphila has been found to consist of two core oligosaccharides: an undeca- and a hexadecasaccharide chain. Both core oligosaccharides contain three 2-keto-3-deoxy-D-manno-octulosonic acid (Kdo) residues that attach to the lipid A moiety of LOS.

Interestingly, both core oligosaccharide forms contain acetylated fucose residues at the end of the oligosaccharide chain. Acetylated fucose may enhance host mimicry and help A. muciniphila evade host immunity.

In addition, N-acetylgalactosamine and N-acetyl-D-glucosamine residues are present in both chains. N-acetylgalactosamine is a monosaccharide found in mucin and antigen A on red blood cells, while N-acetyl-D-glucosamine is present in human hyaluronic acid. The presence of these residues on A. muciniphila LOS may thus mediate host molecular mimicry, inhibiting potential pro-inflammatory responses.

The lipid A moiety is present in tetra-, penta-, and hexa-acetylated forms, with the hexa-acetylated form following a 4+2 symmetry typical for E. coli LPS. The hexa-acetylated form of lipid A is a potent activator of TLR4 signaling.

A blend of mono- and bis-phosphorylated lipid A moieties has also been observed. The presence of monophosphorylated lipid A may weaken interactions with host TLR4 receptors, which could potentially compensate for the pro-inflammatory TLR4 activation of A. muciniphila LOS.

== Activation of TLR signaling ==
Akkermansia muciniphila LOS has been found to induce moderately strong TLR4 activation in vitro. The lipid A moiety of A. muciniphila has been shown to strongly induce TLR2 activation, likely through the TLR2/6 heterodimer. Amuc_1100, an outer membrane protein of A. muciniphila, has also been found to strongly activate TLR2 signaling. It has been hypothesized that activation of anti-inflammatory TLR2 signaling partly explains the beneficial immunomodulatory activities of A. muciniphila.

A phospholipid of A. muciniphila, named a15:0-i15:0 PE, has also been found to activate TLR2 signaling via the noncanonical TLR2/TLR1 heterodimer and result in mild expression of pro-inflammatory cytokines. The consistent, moderate stimulation of TLR2/1 signaling has been proposed to increase the activation threshold of pro-inflammatory signaling, leading to weaker signals being ignored. This would potentially promote homeostatic immunity.

Injection of A. muciniphila LOS has been found to trigger the expression of TLR2 mRNA in mice. Interestingly, the expression of TLR4 mRNA was also shown to increase after LOS injection, although to a much lower level compared to TLR2 mRNA.

== Ecology and metabolism ==
It colonizes the gastrointestinal tract of humans and animals. It can be found within the intestinal mucosal layer of the epithelial crypts as well as in the cecum. It specifically resides at the oxic-anoxic interface. A. muciniphila is found in about 90% of healthy humans, makes up about 1% to 3% of the fecal microbiota and colonizes the gut during the first year of life. Its prevalence can decrease with age or in disease states.

Akkermansia muciniphila can use mucin as its sole source of carbon, nitrogen, and energy, and is hence considered a specialist. It starts the mucin degradation process by removing fucose and sialic acid capping sugars from the end of the mucin O-glycan chain with fucosidases and sialidases, respectively. A. muciniphila can then get access to the de-capped O-glycans and the mucin peptide chain, both of which it can utilize as an energy source. The released monosaccharides are distributed to the environment, where other mucus-associated gut bacteria can utilize them. This way, A. muciniphila contributes to nutrient-sharing in gut-associated microbial communities. Mucin degradation can also lead to the production of beneficial products such as short chain fatty acids, which aid in the growth of other bacteria and maintain healthy mucus turnover. It also maintains microbial balance by competing with and inhibiting the overgrowth of other mucin-degrading bacteria. A. muciniphila is culturable under anaerobic conditions on medium containing porcine gastric mucin or synthetic medium containing protein source with glucose, N-acetylglucosamine and N-acetylgalactosamine.

== Genomics ==
The circular chromosome of the type strain contains 2,664,102 base pairs and its proteome contains 5,644 unique proteins.

== Human consumption ==
Oral Akkermansia muciniphila, either live or pasteurized, "are safe and well tolerated in overweight and obese individuals." However, its safety for use as a treatment during disease states is unestablished.

The European Food Safety Authority determined that pasteurized Akkermansia muciniphila Muc^{T} is a novel food, provided the cells are killed beyond the limit of detection.

== Diet ==
Consumption of galacto-oligosaccharides increases the relative abundance of Akkermansia muciniphila in the human gut.

== Research ==
Akkermansia muciniphila is under preliminary research for its potential to affect various disorders, such as in gut barrier function, obesity, type 2 diabetes, immune system dysfunction, colorectal cancer, and inflammatory bowel disease. Daily administration of live A. muciniphila Muc^{T} has been found to decrease adipose tissue inflammation, insulin resistance and metabolic endotoxemia in mice that were fed a high-fat diet. It has also been shown to lower serum cholesterol and triglyceride levels, as well as prevent MASLD in mice.
