= Akkermansia =

Scientific classification
- Domain: Bacteria
- Kingdom: Pseudomonadati
- Phylum: Verrucomicrobiota
- Class: Verrucomicrobiia
- Order: Verrucomicrobiales
- Family: Akkermansiaceae
- Genus: Akkermansia; Derrien et al. 2004

Type species
- Akkermansia muciniphila Derrien et al. 2004

Species
- A. biwaensis; A. glycaniphila; "Ca. A. intestinavium"; "Ca. A. intestinigallinarum"; A. massiliensis; A. muciniphila; "Ca. A. timonensis"

Genus of bacteria

Akkermansia is a genus in the phylum Verrucomicrobiota (Bacteria). The genus was first proposed by Derrien et al. (2004), with the type species Akkermansia muciniphila (gen. nov., sp. nov).

Until 2016 the genus contained a single known species, namely A. muciniphila. In 2016, Akkermansia glycaniphila was isolated in the feces of a reticulated python.

== Etymology ==
The name Akkermansia (Ak.ker.man'si.a.) derives from: Neo-Latin feminine gender noun Akkermansia, named after Anton Dirk Louis Akkermans (1940–2006), a Dutch microbiologist recognized for his contribution to microbial ecology. Neo-Latin neuter gender noun mucinum, mucin; Neo-Latin adjective philus from Greek adjective philos (φίλος) meaning friend, loving; Neo-Latin feminine gender adjective muciniphila, mucin-loving).

== Description ==
Cells are oval-shaped, non-motile and stain Gram-negative. Strictly anaerobic organism. Chemo-organotrophic. Mucolytic in pure culture.

== Phylogeny ==
The currently accepted taxonomy is based on the List of Prokaryotic names with Standing in Nomenclature (LPSN) and National Center for Biotechnology Information (NCBI).

16S rRNA based LTP_10_2024

- Akkermansia
  - A. glycaniphila
  - - A. biwaensis
    - A. muciniphila

120 marker proteins based GTDB 10-RS226

- Akkermansia
  - - A. biwaensis Kobayashi et al. 2023 [incl. "Ca. A. timonensis" Ndongo et al. 2022]
    - - A. massiliensis Ndongo et al. 2025
      - A. muciniphila Derrien et al. 2004
  - - A. glycaniphila Ouwerkerk et al. 2016
    - - "Ca. A. intestinavium" Gilroy et al. 2021
      - "Ca. A. intestinigallinarum" Gilroy et al. 2021

== Human metabolism ==
Akkermansia muciniphila can live in the human intestinal tract and is currently being studied for its effects on human metabolism and health. It could be of interest for the treatment of obesity and type 2 diabetes. Akkermansia has been shown to reverse high-fat diet-induced metabolic disorders in mice by increasing intestinal levels of endocannabinoids (e.g. 2-arachidonoylglycerol and 2-oleoylglycerol) and mucosal thickness. Another study showed that Akkermansia muciniphila alleviates depression-like behavior by regulating gut microbiota and metabolites in a chronic stress mouse model.
