= Prebiotic (nutrition) =

Nutritional chemicals that help growth of microorganisms

Prebiotics are compounds in food that foster growth or activity of beneficial microorganisms such as bacteria and fungi. The most common environment concerning their effects on human health is the gastrointestinal tract, where prebiotics can alter the composition of organisms in the gut microbiome.

Dietary prebiotics are nondigestible fiber compounds that typically pass undigested through the upper part of the gastrointestinal tract and help growth or activity of advantageous bacteria in the colon by acting as substrates for them. They were first identified and named by Marcel Roberfroid in 1995.

Depending on the jurisdiction, prebiotics may have regulatory scrutiny as food additives for the health claims made for marketing purposes. Common prebiotics used in food manufacturing include beta-glucan from oats, resistant starch from grains and beans, and inulin from chicory root.

== Definition ==
The definition of prebiotics and the food ingredients that may fall under this classification, has evolved since its first definition in 1995. In its earliest definition, the term prebiotics was used to refer to non-digestible food ingredients that were beneficial to the host through their selective stimulation of specific bacteria within the colon. Further research has suggested that selective stimulation has not been scientifically demonstrated. As a result of research suggesting that prebiotics could affect microorganisms outside of the colon, in 2016 the International Scientific Association for Probiotics and Prebiotics (ISAPP) produced the following definition of prebiotics: a substrate that is selectively used by a host microorganism to produce a health benefit. In 2021, The Global Prebiotic Association (GPA) defined a prebiotic as a product or ingredient that is utilized in the microbiota producing a health or performance benefit.

Compounds that may be classified as prebiotics must also meet the following criteria:

- non-digestible and resistant to breakdown by stomach acid and enzymes in the human gastrointestinal tract
- fermented by microorganisms on, or in, the body
- stimulating growth and activity of beneficial bacteria

Thus, consumption of prebiotics may facilitate the health of the host. Based on the previous classifications, plant-derived carbohydrate compounds called oligosaccharides as well as resistant starch are the main source of prebiotics that have been identified. Specifically, fructans and galactans are two oligosaccharide sources that have been found to stimulate the activity and growth of beneficial bacterial colonies in the gut. Fructans are a category of carbohydrate consisting of fructooligosaccharides (FOS) and inulins, while galactans consist of galactooligosaccharides (GOS). Resistant starch has been shown to shift the intestinal bacteria, as well as to improve biomarkers for numerous health conditions. Other dietary fibers also fit the definition of prebiotics, such as pectin, beta-glucans, and xylooligosaccharides.

The European Food Safety Authority (EFSA), the regulatory agency for product labeling, differentiates between "prebiotic" and "dietary fiber", stating that "a cause and effect relationship has not been established between the consumption of the food constituents which are the subject of the health claims and a beneficial physiological effect related to increasing numbers of gastrointestinal microbiota". Consequently, under EFSA rules individual ingredients may not be labeled as prebiotics, but only as dietary fiber and with no implication of health benefits.

== Function ==
When the prebiotic concept was first introduced in 1995, the primary focus was on the effects that prebiotics confer on Bifidobacteria and Lactobacillus. With improved mechanistic techniques in recent years, the current prebiotic targets have expanded to a wider range of microbes, including Roseburia spp., Eubacterium spp., Akkermansia spp., Christensenella spp., Propionibacterium spp., and Faecalibacterium spp. These bacteria have been highlighted as key probiotics and beneficial gut bacteria as they may have several beneficial effects on the host in terms of improving digestion (including, but not limited to, enhancing mineral absorption) and the effectiveness and intrinsic strength of the immune system. Both Bifidobacteria and Lactobacillus have been shown to have differing prebiotic specificity and to selectively ferment prebiotic fiber based on the enzymes characteristic of the bacterial population. Thus, Lactobacilli prefer inulin and fructooligosaccharides, while Bifidobacteria display specificity for inulin, fructooligosaccharides, xylooligosaccharides and galactooligosaccharides. Studies have also shown that prebiotics, besides helping growth of beneficial gut bacteria, also may inhibit detrimental and potentially pathogenic microbes in the gut, such as clostridia.

=== Mechanism of action ===
Fermentation is the main mechanism of action by which prebiotics are used by beneficial bacteria in the colon. Both Bifidobacteria and Lactobacillus are bacterial populations that use saccharolytic metabolism to break down substrates. The bifidobacterial genome contains many genes that encode for carbohydrate-modifying enzymes as well as genes that encode for carbohydrate uptake proteins. The presence of these genes indicates that Bifidobacteria contain specific metabolic pathways specialized for the fermentation and metabolism of plant-derived oligosaccharides, or prebiotics. These pathways in Bifidobacteria ultimately produce short chain fatty acids, which have diverse physiological roles in body functions.

== Sources ==
Prebiotic sources must be proven to confer a benefit to the host in order to be classified as a prebiotic. Fermentable carbohydrates derived from fructans and xylans are one well-documented example of prebiotics. Resistant starch from starchy foods are also well-documented prebiotics and have historically been the highest source of prebiotics in the diet, as 4–10% of starch in mixed diets has been shown to reach the large intestine. For example, one study of dietary cancer risks reported that individuals consuming a traditional diet in a rural African population consumed 38 grams of resistant starch per day.

=== Endogenous ===
An endogenous source of prebiotics in humans is human breast milk, which contains oligosaccharides structurally similar to galactooligosaccharides, referred to as human milk oligosaccharides. Human milk oligosaccharides were found to increase the Bifidobacteria bacterial population in breastfed infants, and to strengthen the infant immune system. Furthermore, human milk oligosaccharides help establish a healthy intestinal microbiota composition in newborns.

=== Exogenous ===
Indigestible carbohydrate compounds classified as prebiotics are a type of fermentable fiber, and thus can be classified as dietary fiber. However, not all dietary fiber may be classified as a prebiotic source. In addition to the food sources highlighted in the following table, raw oats, unrefined barley, yacón, and whole grain breakfast cereals are also classified as prebiotic fiber sources. The predominant type of prebiotic fiber may vary according to the food. For instance, oats and barley have high amounts of beta-glucans, fruit and berries contain pectins, seeds contain gums, onions and Jerusalem artichokes are rich in inulin and oligofructose, and bananas and legumes contain resistant starch.

Foods that are high in prebiotics
Food	Prebiotic fiber by weight
Gum arabic (acacia)	85%
Raw, dry chicory root	64.6%
Raw, dry Jerusalem artichoke	31.5%
Raw, dry dandelion greens	24.3%
Raw, dry garlic	17.5%
Raw, dry leek	11.7%
Raw, dry onion	8.6%
Raw asparagus	5%
Raw wheat bran	5%
Cooked whole wheat flour	4.8%
Raw banana	1%

While there is no broad consensus on an ideal daily serving of prebiotics, recommendations typically range from 4 to 8 grams (0.14–0.28 oz) for general digestive health support, to 15 grams (0.53 oz) or more for those with active digestive disorders. Given an average 6 grams (0.21 oz) serving, below are the amounts of prebiotic foods required to achieve a daily serving of prebiotic fiber:

Amount of food needed for 6 g of fructan
Food	Amount
Raw chicory root	9.3 g (0.33 oz)
Raw Jerusalem artichoke	19 g (0.67 oz)
Raw dandelion greens	24.7 g (0.87 oz)
Raw garlic	34.3 g (1.21 oz)
Raw leek	51.3 g (1.81 oz)
Raw onion	69.8 g (2.46 oz)
Cooked onion	120 g (4.2 oz)
Raw asparagus	120 g (4.2 oz)
Raw wheat bran	120 g (4.2 oz)
Cooked whole wheat flour	125 g (4.4 oz)
Raw banana	600 g (1.3 lb)

== Research ==
Preliminary research has demonstrated potential effects on calcium and other mineral absorption, immune system effectiveness, bowel acidity, reduction of colorectal cancer risk, inflammatory bowel disease (Crohn's disease or ulcerative colitis), hypertension and defecation frequency. Prebiotics may be effective in decreasing the number of infectious episodes needing antibiotics and the total number of infections in children aged 0–24 months.

No good evidence shows that prebiotics are effective in preventing or treating allergies.

While research demonstrates that prebiotics lead to increased production of short-chain fatty acids (SCFA), more research is required to establish a direct causal connection. Prebiotics may be beneficial to inflammatory bowel disease or Crohn's disease through production of SCFA as nourishment for colonic walls, and mitigation of ulcerative colitis symptoms.

The sudden addition of substantial quantities of prebiotics to the diet may result in an increase in fermentation, leading to increased gas production, bloating or bowel movement. Production of SCFA and fermentation quality are reduced during long-term diets of low fiber intake. Until bacterial flora are gradually established to rehabilitate or restore intestinal bacteria, nutrient absorption may be impaired and colonic transit time temporarily increased with a rapid addition of higher prebiotic intake.

=== Genetic modification ===
Genetically modified plants have been created in research labs with upregulated inulin production.

== See also ==
- Antibiotic – Antimicrobial substance active against bacteria
- Mannan Oligosaccharide based nutritional supplements (MOS) – Polysaccharides formed from mannose
- Prebiotic scores – Measure of effects of prebiotics
- Probiotic – Microorganism consumed in food
- Psychobiotic – Microorganisms giving mental health effects
- Resistant starch – Dietary fiber
- Synbiotics – Nutritional supplements
