= Oligosaccharide =

Saccharide polymer

An oligosaccharide (/ˌɒlɪɡoʊˈsækəˌraɪd/; from Ancient Greek ὀλίγος (olígos) 'few' and σάκχαρ (sákkhar) 'sugar') is a saccharide polymer containing a small number (typically three to ten) of monosaccharides (simple sugars). Oligosaccharides can have many functions including cell recognition and cell adhesion.

They are normally present as glycans: oligosaccharide chains are linked to lipids or to compatible amino acid side chains in proteins, by N- or O-glycosidic bonds. N-Linked oligosaccharides are always pentasaccharides attached to asparagine via a beta linkage to the amine nitrogen of the side chain. Alternately, O-linked oligosaccharides are generally attached to threonine or serine on the alcohol group of the side chain. Not all natural oligosaccharides occur as components of glycoproteins or glycolipids. Some, such as the raffinose series, occur as storage or transport carbohydrates in plants. Others, such as maltodextrins or cellodextrins, result from the microbial breakdown of larger polysaccharides such as starch or cellulose.

The structure of fructooligosaccharide

== Glycosylation ==
In biology, glycosylation is the process by which a carbohydrate is covalently attached to an organic molecule, creating structures such as glycoproteins and glycolipids.

=== N-Linked oligosaccharides ===
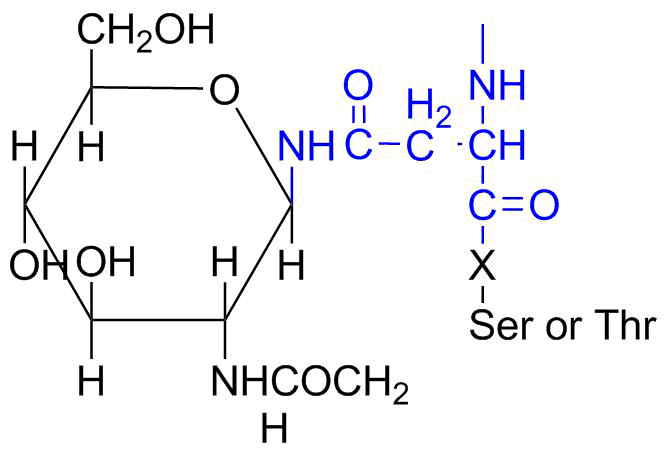
An example of an N-linked oligosaccharide, shown here with GlcNAc. X is any amino acid except proline.

N-Linked glycosylation involves oligosaccharide attachment to asparagine via a beta linkage to the amine nitrogen of the side chain. The process of N-linked glycosylation occurs cotranslationally, or concurrently while the proteins are being translated. Since it is added cotranslationally, it is believed that N-linked glycosylation helps determine the folding of polypeptides due to the hydrophilic nature of sugars.

In N-glycosylation for eukaryotes, the oligosaccharide substrate is assembled right at the membrane of the endoplasmatic reticulum. For prokaryotes, this process occurs at the plasma membrane. In both cases, the acceptor substrate is an asparagine residue. The asparagine residue linked to an N-linked oligosaccharide usually occurs in the sequence Asn-X-Ser/Thr, where X can be any amino acid except for proline, although it is rare to see Asp, Glu, Leu, or Trp in this position.

=== O-Linked oligosaccharides ===
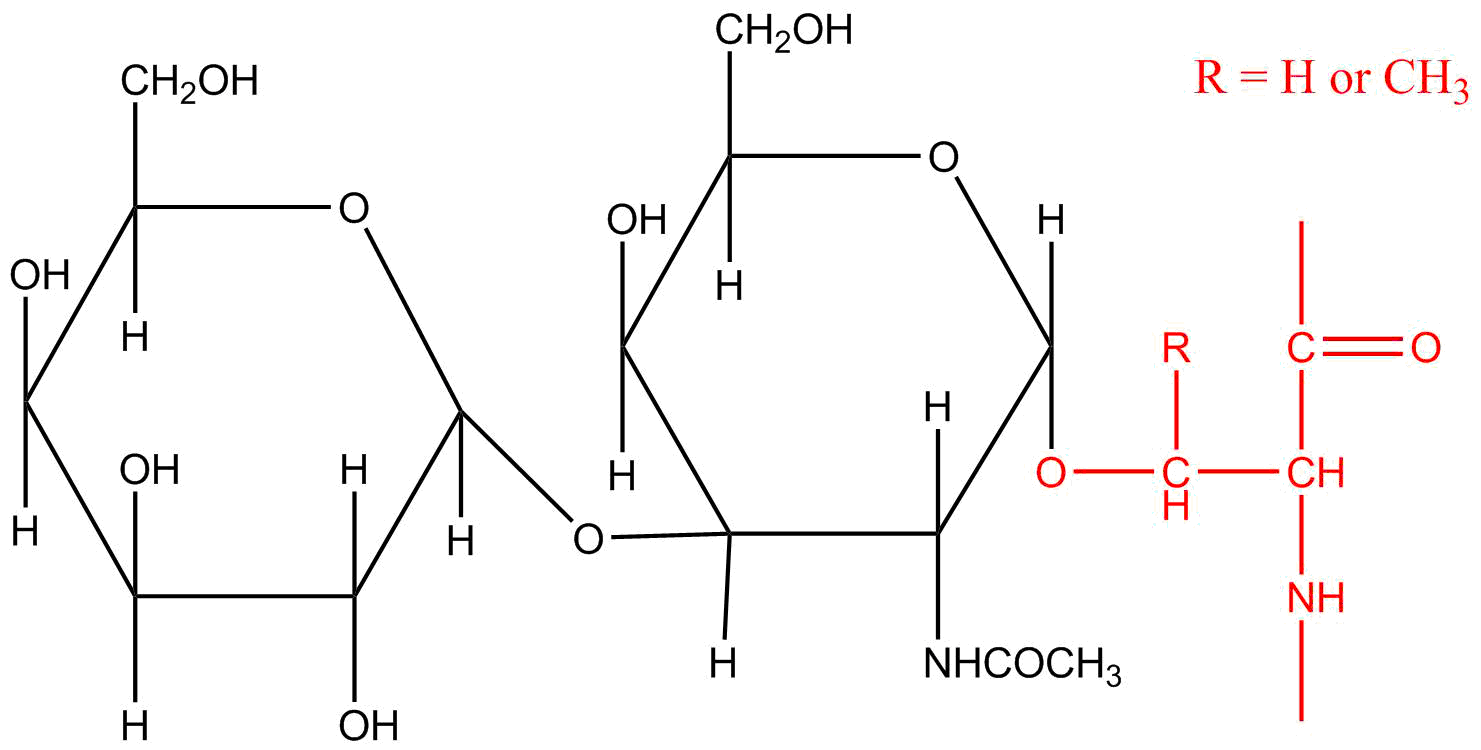
An example of an O-linked oligosaccharide with β-Galactosyl-(1n3)-α-N-acetylgalactosaminyl-Ser/Thr.

Oligosaccharides that participate in O-linked glycosylation are attached to threonine or serine on the hydroxyl group of the side chain. O-linked glycosylation occurs in the Golgi apparatus, where monosaccharide units are added to a complete polypeptide chain. Cell surface proteins and extracellular proteins are O-glycosylated. Glycosylation sites in O-linked oligosaccharides are determined by the secondary and tertiary structures of the polypeptide, which dictate where glycosyltransferases will add sugars.

== Glycosylated biomolecules ==
Glycoproteins and glycolipids are by definition covalently bonded to carbohydrates. They are very abundant on the surface of the cell, and their interactions contribute to the overall stability of the cell.

=== Glycoproteins ===
Glycoproteins have distinct Oligosaccharide structures which have significant effects on many of their properties, affecting critical functions such as antigenicity, solubility, and resistance to proteases. Glycoproteins are relevant as cell-surface receptors, cell-adhesion molecules, immunoglobulins, and tumor antigens.

=== Glycolipids ===
Glycolipids are important for cell recognition, and are important for modulating the function of membrane proteins that act as receptors. Glycolipids are lipid molecules bound to oligosaccharides, generally present in the lipid bilayer. Additionally, they can serve as receptors for cellular recognition and cell signaling. The head of the oligosaccharide serves as a binding partner in receptor activity. The binding mechanisms of receptors to the oligosaccharides depends on the composition of the oligosaccharides that are exposed or presented above the surface of the membrane. There is great diversity in the binding mechanisms of glycolipids, which is what makes them such an important target for pathogens as a site for interaction and entrance. For example, the chaperone activity of glycolipids has been studied for its relevance to HIV infection.

== Functions ==
=== Cell recognition ===
All cells are coated in either glycoproteins or glycolipids, both of which help determine cell types. Lectins, or proteins that bind carbohydrates, can recognize specific oligosaccharides and provide useful information for cell recognition based on oligosaccharide binding.

An important example of oligosaccharide cell recognition is the role of glycolipids in determining blood types. The various blood types are distinguished by the glycan modification present on the surface of blood cells. These can be visualized using mass spectrometry. The oligosaccharides found on the A, B, and H antigen occur on the non-reducing ends of the oligosaccharide. The H antigen (which indicates an O blood type) serves as a precursor for the A and B antigen. Therefore, a person with A blood type will have the A antigen and H antigen present on the glycolipids of the red blood cell plasma membrane. A person with B blood type will have the B and H antigen present. A person with AB blood type will have A, B, and H antigens present. And finally, a person with O blood type will only have the H antigen present. This means all blood types have the H antigen, which explains why the O blood type is known as the "universal donor".

Vesicles are directed by many ways, but the two main ways are:

1. The sorting signals encoded in the amino acid sequence of the proteins.
2. The Oligosaccharide attached to the protein.

The sorting signals are recognised by specific receptors that reside in the membranes or surface coats of budding vesicles, ensuring that the protein is transported to the appropriate destination.

=== Cell adhesion ===
Many cells produce specific carbohydrate-binding proteins known as lectins, which mediate cell adhesion with oligosaccharides. Selectins, a family of lectins, mediate certain cell–cell adhesion processes, including those of leukocytes to endothelial cells. In an immune response, endothelial cells can express certain selectins transiently in response to damage or injury to the cells. In response, a reciprocal selectin–oligosaccharide interaction will occur between the two molecules which allows the white blood cell to help eliminate the infection or damage. Protein-Carbohydrate bonding is often mediated by hydrogen bonding and van der Waals forces.

== Dietary oligosaccharides ==
Fructo-oligosaccharides (FOS), which are found in many vegetables, are short chains of fructose molecules. They differ from fructans such as inulin, which as polysaccharides have a much higher degree of polymerization than FOS and other oligosaccharides, but like inulin and other fructans, they are considered soluble dietary fibre. FOS as a dietary supplementation was linked to glucose homeostasis. These FOS supplementations can be considered prebiotics which produce short-chain fructo-oligosaccharides (scFOS). Galacto-oligosaccharides (GOS) in particular are used to create a prebiotic effect for infants that are not being breastfed.

Galactooligosaccharides (GOS), which also occur naturally, consist of short chains of galactose molecules. Human milk is an example of this and contains oligosaccharides, known as human milk oligosaccharides (HMOs), which are derived from lactose. These oligosaccharides have biological function in the development of the gut flora of infants. Examples include lacto-N-tetraose, lacto-N-neotetraose, and lacto-N-fucopentaose. These compounds cannot be digested in the human small intestine, and instead pass through to the large intestine, where they promote the growth of Bifidobacteria, which are beneficial to gut health.

HMOs can also protect infants by acting as decoy receptors against viral infection. HMOs accomplish this by mimicking viral receptors which draws the virus particles away from host cells. Experimentation has been done to determine how glycan-binding occurs between HMOs and many viruses such as influenza, rotavirus, human immunodeficiency virus (HIV), and respiratory syncytial virus (RSV). The strategy HMOs employ could be used to create new antiviral drugs.

Mannan oligosaccharides (MOS) are widely used in animal feed to improve gastrointestinal health. They are normally obtained from the yeast cell walls of Saccharomyces cerevisiae. Mannan oligosaccharides differ from other oligosaccharides in that they are not fermentable and their primary mode of action includes agglutination of type-1 fimbria pathogens and immunomodulation.

=== Sources ===
Oligosaccharides are a component of fibre from plant tissue. FOS and inulin are present in Jerusalem artichoke, burdock, chicory, leeks, onions, and asparagus. Inulin is a significant part of the daily diet of most of the world's population. FOS can also be synthesized by enzymes of the fungus Aspergillus niger acting on sucrose. GOS is naturally found in soybeans and can be synthesized from lactose. FOS, GOS, and inulin are also sold as nutritional supplements.

== See also ==
- Carbohydrate synthesis – Sub-field of organic chemistry
- Oligosaccharide nomenclature – Devising names for a class of carbohydrates
- Isomaltooligosaccharide – Mixture of short-chain carbohydrates
