= Filmjölk =

Traditional Swedish fermented milk product

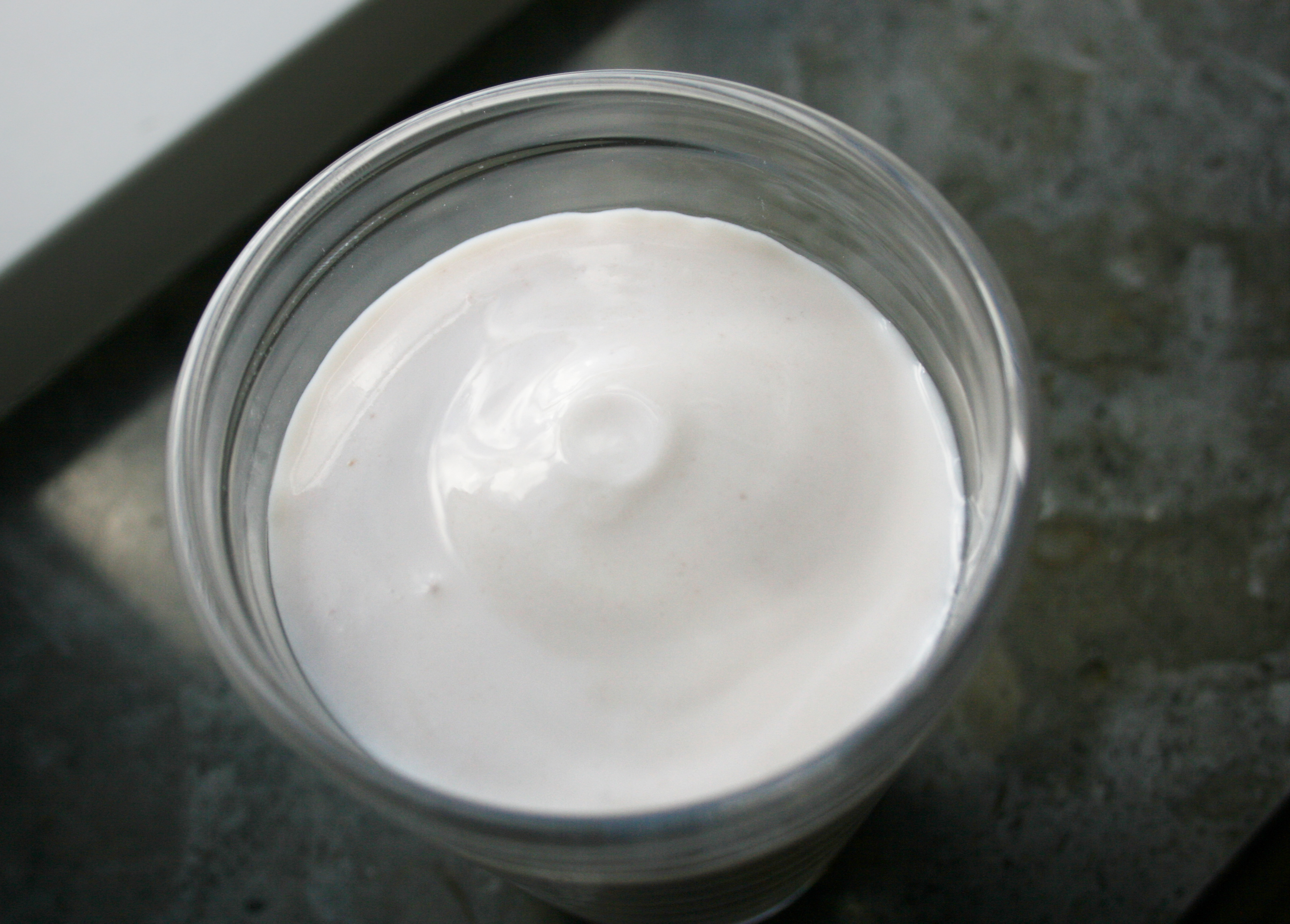
Filmjölk in a glass

Filmjölk (Swedish: [ˈfîːl.ˌmjœlk]), also known as fil, is a traditional fermented milk product from Sweden, and a common dairy product within most of the Nordic countries. It is made by fermenting cow's milk with a variety of bacteria from the species Lactococcus lactis and Leuconostoc mesenteroides. The bacteria metabolize lactose, the sugar naturally found in milk, into lactic acid, which means people who are lactose intolerant can tolerate it better than other dairy products. The acid gives filmjölk a sour taste and causes proteins in the milk, mainly casein, to coagulate, thus thickening the final product. The bacteria also produce a limited amount of diacetyl, a compound with a buttery flavor, which gives filmjölk its characteristic taste.

Filmjölk has a mild and slightly acidic taste. It has a shelf-life of around 10–14 days at refrigeration temperature.

== Overview ==
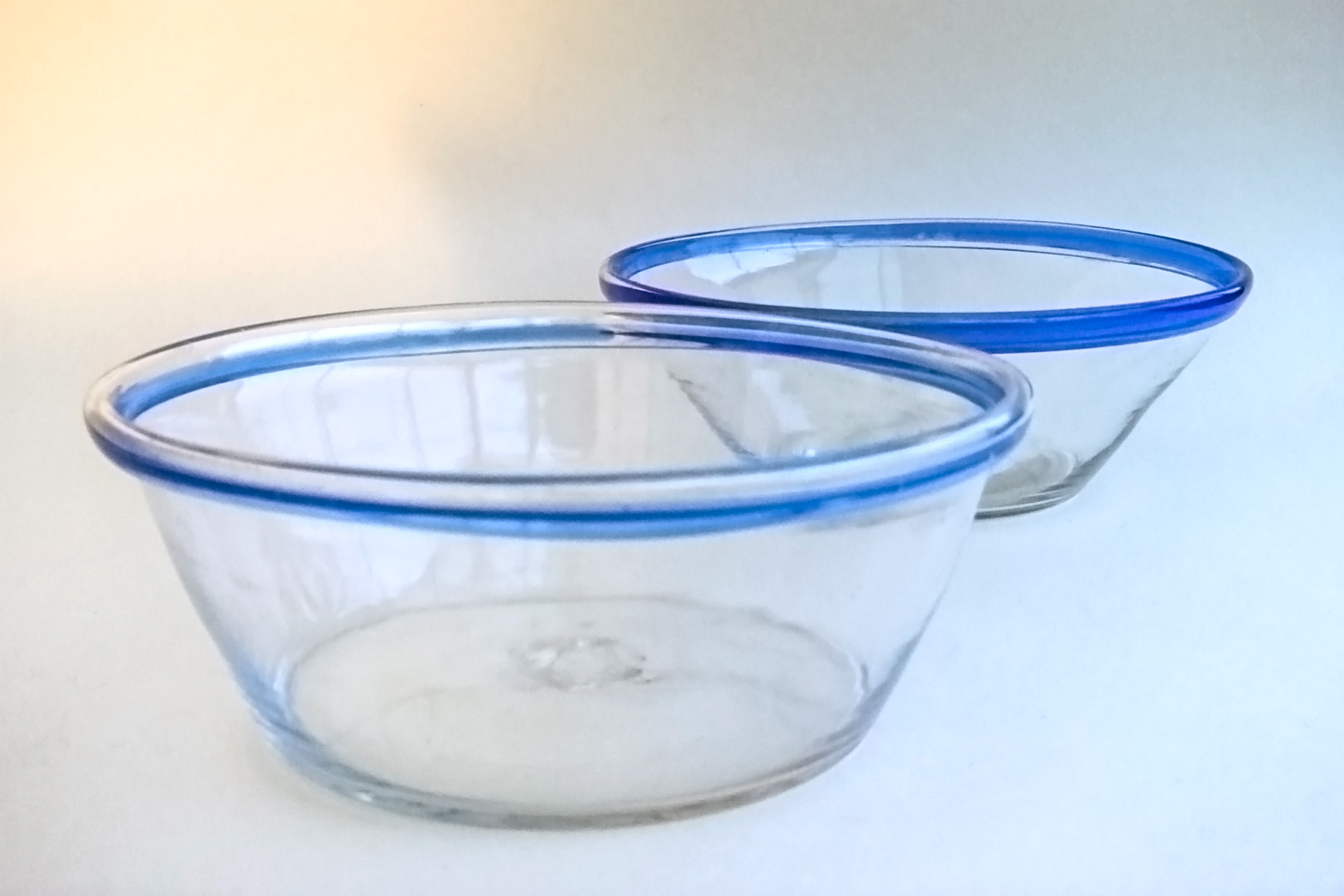
Old traditional small glass bowls for making filmjölk (filbunkeskålar), handmade from Bergdala glassworks, Lessebo Municipality

In the Nordic countries, filmjölk is often eaten with breakfast cereal, muesli or crushed crisp bread on top. Some people add sugar, jam, apple sauce, cinnamon, ginger, fruits, or berries for extra flavor.

In Norwegian it is called surmelk (Nynorsk: surmjølk) ('sour milk') or skjør/skyr but the official name is kulturmelk (Nynorsk: kulturmjølk). The drink is also popular in Latvian kitchens, where it is called rūgušpiens, rūgtpiens ('fermented milk' or 'sour milk') and can be bought ready from stores but is more commonly made at home. It can also be purchased and is popular in the neighboring country, Lithuania, where it is called rūgpienis or raugintas pienas ('sour/fermented milk'). Due to its popularity, it can be bought in many stores alongside kefir.

Manufactured filmjölk is made from pasteurised, homogenised, and standardised cow's milk. Although homemade filmjölk has been around for a long time (written records from the 18th century speak of filmjölk-like products, but it has probably been around since the Viking Age or longer), it was first introduced to the Swedish market as a consumer product in 1931 by the Swedish dairy cooperative Arla. The first filmjölk was unflavoured and contained 3% milkfat. Since the 1960s, different varieties of unflavoured filmjölk have been marketed in Swedish grocery stores. Långfil, a more elastic variant of filmjölk was introduced in 1965; lättfil, filmjölk with 0.5% milkfat was introduced in 1967; and mellanfil, filmjölk with 1.5% milkfat, was introduced in 1990.

In 1997, Arla introduced its first flavoured filmjölk: strawberry-flavoured filmjölk. The flavoured filmjölk was so popular that different flavours soon followed. By 2001, almost one third of the filmjölk sold in Sweden was flavoured filmjölk. Since 2007, variations of filmjölk include filmjölk with various fat content, filmjölk flavoured with fruit, vanilla, or honey, as well as filmjölk with probiotic bacteria that is said to be more healthy, such as Onaka fil which contains Bifidobacterium lactis (a strain of bacteria popular in Japan) and Verum Hälsofil which contains Lactococcus lactis L1A in quantities of at least 10 billion live bacteria per deciliter.

== In English ==
There is no single accepted English term for fil or filmjölk, but the most common English term is yogurt. Fil and/or filmjölk has been is sometimes translated to English as sour milk, soured milk, acidulated milk, fermented milk, and curdled milk, all of which are nearly synonymous and describe filmjölk but do not differentiate filmjölk from other types of soured/fermented milk. Filmjölk has also been described as viscous fermented milk and viscous mesophilic fermented milk,. Furthermore, articles written in English can be found that use the Swedish term filmjölk, as well as the Anglicised spellings filmjolk, fil mjölk, and fil mjolk.

In baking, when filmjölk is called for, cultured buttermilk can be substituted.

== In Finland Swedish ==
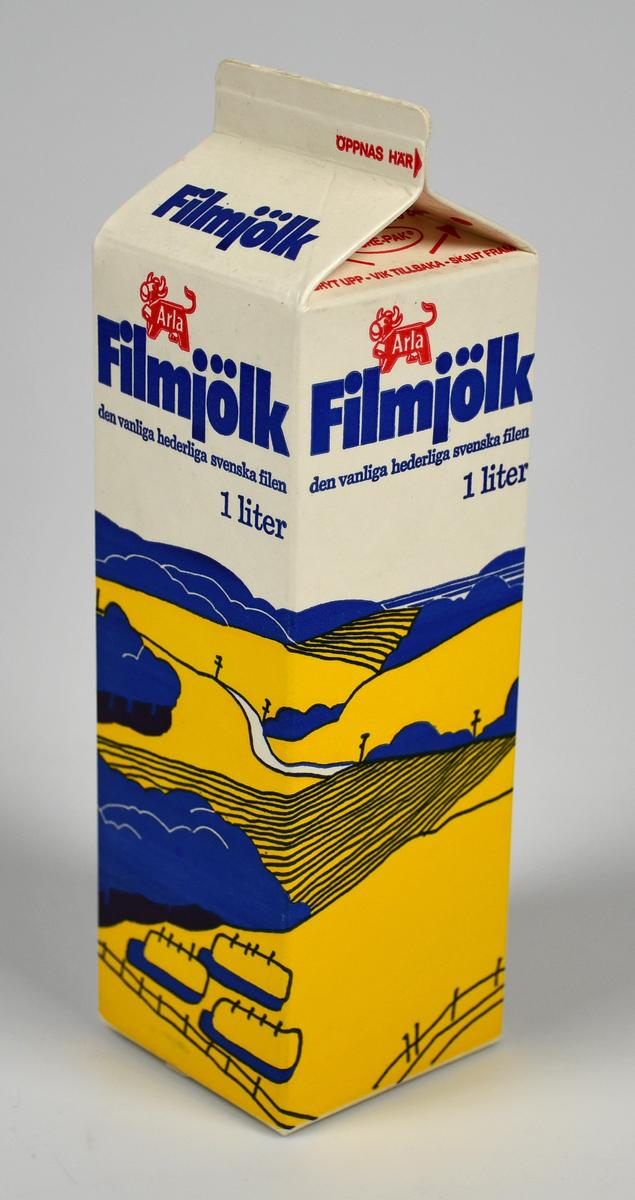
One liter brick pack of filmjölk from Arla, 1960–1970

In Finland Swedish, the dialects spoken by the Swedish-speaking population of Finland, fil is the equivalent of filbunke in Sweden. Not all variants of filmjölk are found in Finland, normally only filbunke and långfil. Swedish-speakers in Finland usually use the word surmjölk, which is the older name for filmjölk (also in Sweden) or piimä (in Finnish), which is a fermented milk product that is thinner than filmjölk and resembles cultured buttermilk.

== Types in Sweden ==
In Sweden, there are five Swedish dairy cooperatives that produce filmjölk: Arla Foods, Falköpings Mejeri, Gefleortens Mejeri, Norrmejerier, and Skånemejerier. In addition, Wapnö AB, a Swedish dairy company, and Valio, a Finnish dairy company, also sell a limited variety of filmjölk in Sweden. Prior to the industrial manufacture of filmjölk, many families made filmjölk at home.

Fil culture is a variety of bacterium from the species Lactococcus lactis and Leuconostoc mesenteroides, e.g., Arla's fil culture contains Lactococcus lactis subsp. lactis, Lactococcus lactis subsp. cremoris, Lactococcus lactis biovar. diacetylactis, and Leuconostoc mesenteroides subsp. cremoris.

=== Classic variants ===
Name	Literal translation	Milkfat content	Fermentation culture	Produced by	Year introduced	Description
Filmjölk		2.5%–3%	fil culture	Arla Foods, Falköpings Mejeri, Gefleortens Mejeri, Milko, Norrmejerier, Skånemejerier, Wapnö AB	1931 (Arla)	"Regular" filmjölk. Filmjölk made from 3% milkfat. Comes unflavoured and flavoured. Also comes in a variant made from organic milk, a low-lactose variant that has been treated with lactase enzyme, a variant with added fiber (f-fil, fil med fiber), and a variant with higher milkfat content (Arla Vår finaste filmjölk, 3.8–4.5% milkfat). Has been in the Swedish language since 1741.
Mellanfil	middle (lowfat) filmjölk	1.3%, 1.5%	fil culture	Arla Foods, Falköpings Mejeri, Gefleortens Mejeri, Milko, Norrmejerier, Skånemejerier	1990 (Arla)	Filmjölk made from 1.5% milkfat. Comes unflavoured only.
Lättfil	light (nonfat) filmjölk	0.4%, 0.5%	fil culture	Arla Foods, Falköpings Mejeri, Gefleortens Mejeri, Milko, Norrmejerier, Skånemejerier, Wapnö AB	1967 (Arla), 1968	Filmjölk made from 0.5% milkfat. Comes unflavoured and flavoured. Also comes in a low-lactose variant that has been treated with lactase enzyme.
Långfil fi: pitkäviili	long fil	3%	fil culture + Lactococcus lactis subsp. lactis var. longi	Arla Foods, Gefleortens Mejeri, Norrmejerier, previously Milko (which was "longer" than Arla's)	1965 (Arla)	Filmjölk with a characteristic long and almost elastic texture due to Lactococcus lactis var. longi, a strain of bacteria that converts the carbohydrates in milk into long chains of polysaccharides. Comes unflavoured only. More common in northern Sweden. Sometimes eaten with ground ginger. Has been in the Swedish language since 1896.
Bollnäsfil	Bollnäs fil	3%	fil culture from Bollnäs	Milko		Filmjölk that originated in Bollnäs. Comes unflavoured or vanilla flavoured.
Fjällfil	fell fil	0.8%, 3.8–4.5%	special fil culture	Norrmejerier		Available as unflavoured, with birch sap, blueberry, cloudberry or raspberry.
Filbunke fi-se: Fil fi: Viili	bowl of fil	1%, 1.9%, 2.2%, 2.5%, 3%, 3.5%, 4%	special fil culture	Milko, Valio		Milk that has fermented, unstirred, in small bowls. Has a pudding-like consistency. Similar to unstirred långfil. Traditionally made in small bowls from (unpasteurized and unhomogenized) raw milk, which normally contains some cream. The cream forms a yellowish layer of sour cream on top. Comes unflavoured and flavoured. Has been in the Swedish language since 1652.
Laktosfri fil	lactose-free fil	3.5%	fil culture	Valio		Filmjölk made from 3.5% milkfat and treated with lactase enzyme. Comes unflavoured only.

=== Probiotic variants ===
Name	Literal translation	Milkfat content	Fermentation culture	Produced by	Year introduced	Description
A-fil		0.5%, 2.7%, 3%	fil culture + Lactobacillus acidophilus	Arla Foods, Falköpings Mejeri, Gefleortens Mejeri, Milko, Skånemejerier, Wapnö AB	1984 (Arla)	Filmjölk with Lactobacillus acidophilus, a commonly used probiotic bacterium. Comes unflavoured and flavoured. Also comes in a low-lactose variant that has been treated with lactase enzyme.
Cultura aktiv fil	Cultura active fil	0.1%	fil culture + Lactobacillus casei F19	Arla Foods	2004	Filmjölk with Lactobacillus casei F19, a patented probiotic bacteria. Comes unflavoured only.
Kefir		3%	Lactococcus lactis subsp. lactis, Lactococcus lactis subsp. cremoris, Lactobacillus brevis, Leuconostoc mesenteroides subsp. cremoris, Candida kefyr	Arla Foods	1977	Filmjölk variant based on kefir, a probiotic food; only contains a small subset of microorganisms found in kefir grains. Originated in Caucasus. Comes unflavoured.
Onaka	stomach (Japanese)	1.5%	fil culture + Bifidobacterium lactis	Arla Foods	1990	Filmjölk with Bifidobacterium lactis, a probiotic bacteria popular in Japan. Comes unflavoured and flavoured.
Philura		1.5%, 2.6%	Lactobacillus acidophilus, Bifidobacterium lactis, Lactobacillus casei	Milko	2003	Tastes somewhere between regular filmjölk and yogurt. Contains probiotic bacteria that is normally found in the digestive system. Comes unflavoured and flavoured.
Verum hälsofil	Verum health fil	0.5%, 4%	Lactococcus lactis L1A	Norrmejerier	1990	Filmjölk that contains at least 10^{8} Lactococcus lactis L1A bacteria per milliliter. Comes unflavoured and flavoured. Lactococcus lactis L1A is a patented strain of probiotic bacteria that originated from a culture of långfil from a farm in Västerbotten. In 1998 Verum hälsofil was approved as a natural medical product (naturläkemedel) by the Swedish national regulatory agency Medical Products Agency (Läkemedelsverket). It has been shown to have a positive effect on the immune and digestive system.
Öresundsfil	Öresund fil	0.9%, 1%	fil culture + Lactobacillus acidophilus and Bifidobacterium	Skånemejerier	2000	Filmjölk with Lactobacillus acidophilus and Bifidobacterium, probiotic bacteria. Comes unflavoured and flavoured.
ProViva Naturell Filmjölk	ProViva unflavoured filmjölk	1%	fil culture + Lactobacillus plantarum 299v	Skånemejerier	1994	Filmjölk that contains at least 5.0 × 10^{7} Lp 299v per milliliter. Comes unflavoured. Lp 299v, a patented probiotic bacteria, has been shown to decrease the symptoms of colon irritation and stressed digestive system in people who consumed ProViva.

== Homemade filmjölk ==
To make filmjölk, a small amount of bacteria from an active batch of filmjölk is normally transferred to pasteurised milk and then left one to two days to ferment at room temperature or in a cool cellar. The fil culture is needed when using pasteurised milk because the bacteria occurring naturally in milk are killed during the pasteurisation process.

== Tätmjölk ==
A variant of filmjölk called tätmjölk, filtäte, täte or långmjölk is made by rubbing the inside of a container with leaves of certain plants: sundew (Drosera, Swedish: sileshår) or butterwort (Pinguicula, Swedish: tätört). Lukewarm milk is added to the container and left to ferment for one to two days. More tätmjölk can then be made by adding completed tätmjölk to milk. In Flora Lapponica (1737), Carl von Linné described a recipe for tätmjölk and wrote that any species of butterwort could be used to make it.

Sundew and butterwort are carnivorous plants that have enzymes that degrade proteins, which make the milk thick. How butterwort influences the production of tätmjölk is not completely understood – lactic acid bacteria have not been isolated during analyses of butterwort.

== See also ==
- Cuisine of Sweden
- Amasi
- Kumis
- Skyr
- Yogurt
- Ayran
- Viili
- Matzoon
- Buttermilk
- Kefir
- List of dairy products
