= Activia =

French yogurt brand

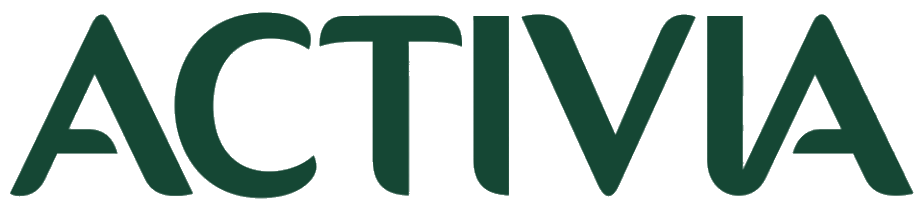
- Product type: Dairy
- Current owner: Danone
- Country: France
- Introduced: 1987; 39 years ago
- Website: activia.us.com

Activia is a brand of yogurt owned by Groupe Danone (Dannon in the United States) and introduced in France in 1987. As of 2013, Activia is present in more than 70 countries and on 5 continents. Activia is classified as a functional food, designed to improve digestive health.

In the 1980s, Danone researchers took interest in bifidobacteria. They developed a specific strain that can survive in the acidic medium of yogurt. In addition to traditional yogurt bacteria, they decided to add a probiotic strain. Activia products thus contain Bifidobacterium animalis DN 173,010, a proprietary strain of Bifidobacterium, a probiotic which is marketed by Dannon under the trade names Bifidus Regularis, Bifidus Actiregularis, Bifidus Digestivum and Bifidobacterium Lactis. Danone launched Activia in France in 1987 under the "Bio" brand name. The claims of health benefits have led to lawsuits in the European Union, Canada, and the United States, all of which have resulted in Danone having to modify their advertisement and pay compensations to customers.

== Introductions into new countries ==
- 1987: France
- 1988: Belgium, Spain, and the United Kingdom
- 1989: Italy
- 2002: Russia, Japan
- 2004: Brazil, and Canada
- 2005: Africa, China, and the United States
- 2009: South Korea
- 2011: Australia

By 2006, the brand was operating in 22 countries. In 2013, it was sold in more than 70 countries.

== Products in 2013 ==
Activia products are sold with different textures (set or firm, stirred, drinkable, etc.) and inflavors adapted to local consumer preferences. The product line varies by country. Most Activia yogurts contain real fruit.

=== America ===
==== United States ====
- Activia: a yogurt that consists of cherry, prune, strawberry banana, peach, mixed berry, blueberry, strawberry, vanilla
- Activia Light: strawberry banana, key lime, raspberry, blueberry, peach, strawberry, vanilla
- Activia Harvest Picks: cherry, mixed berry, peach, strawberry
- Activia Breakfast Blend: apple cinnamon, maple and brown sugar, banana bread, vanilla
- Activia Fiber: peach cereal, strawberry cereal, vanilla cereal
- Activia Drinks: mango, peach, prune, strawberry, strawberry banana
- Activia 24 oz. Tubs: vanilla light, plain, vanilla

==== Canada ====
- Activia: blueberry, vanilla, raspberry, strawberry, strawberry rhubarb, prune, peach, cherry, lemon, plain unsweetened, plain sweetened, apple and blackberry
- Activia source of fiber: strawberry kiwi cereal, red fruits cereal, peach cereal, vanilla cereal, blueberry cereal
- Activia fat free: strawberry, vanilla, raspberry, peach
- Drinkable Activia: strawberry, vanilla, mixed berry

==== Brazil ====
In Brazil, both yogurt and yogurt-drinks are available. In addition to the usual worldwide fruit flavors, honey with carrot is also available. The "light" line is marketed as "0%" fat.

=== Europe ===
In Bulgaria, Croatia, and Romania the products include semi-solid yogurts (plain, cereal, strawberry, peach and prune) and yogurt drinks (plain, cereal, strawberry-kiwi and cherry-vanilla).

In Finland the Activia brand includes fruit and natural yogurt as well as yogurt drinks. Lactose free forms of the yogurt are also sold.

In France, semi-solid yogurt and yogurt with fruit layers are available. Unique flavors include coconut. The "light" series is marketed as "0%" fat.

In Spain there are over 57 different flavors.

Following a European law which forbids non-organic food to be labeled "Bio", Danone changed Spanish "Bio"-branded products to the "Activia" brand in order to comply with the law.

In Russia, the products include yogurt, yogurt drinks, and kefir, a drink traditionally popular in Commonwealth of Independent States countries. The fiber yogurt series includes three muesli flavors in addition to the oat cereal flavor found in the US and UK. Drinkable yogurt variations include pineapple and dried apricot, among others. In 2023 Danone has decided to localize the international brand Activia under the new name AktiBio on the Russian market. The changes will concern only the brand name and packaging design.

==== United Kingdom and Ireland ====
In Britain and Republic of Ireland, the Activia range includes:

- Fruit: mango, cranberry, fig, kiwi, apricot, prune, rhubarb, strawberry, cereals fibre, pear
- 0% Fat Free: peach, cherry, forest fruit, mandarin, mango, blueberry, pineapple, raspberry, strawberry, vanilla
- Single pot fat free: peach, cherry, raspberry, strawberry, banana toffee and biscuity bits, juicy pineapple
- Fruit Layer: prune, raspberry
- Natural: 500 Gram pot
- Intensely Creamy Classics: raspberry, cherry, peaches, strawberry, lemon, vanilla
- Intensely Creamy Temptations: caramel, coconut
- Greek style: berries, lemon, honey
- Breakfast pouring yogurt: natural, vanilla, strawberry.
- Breakfast pots (with crunchy clusters): vanilla, honey, peach

=== Africa ===
In the Republic of South Africa, flavors include pear, mango, dried apricot, kiwi, fiber and prune.

=== Australia ===
- 4-Pack: strawberry, natural, vanilla, fig, berries, mango
- Dessert: strawberry shortcake, apple strudel, passionfruit cheesecake
- Favourites: vanilla berries mango, berries strawberry blueberry
- Large Tub: strawberry, vanilla
- Pouring: strawberry, mango, natural, vanilla
- Singles: berries, strawberry, mango

== Market ==
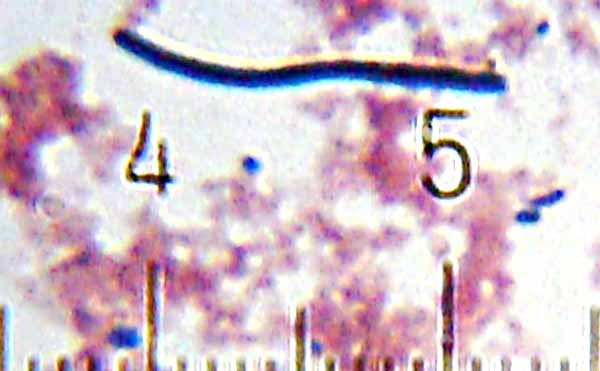
Lactobacillus bulgaricus, also from a sample of Activia yogurt. The numbered ticks are 11 micrometres apart.

With its launch in France in the 1980s, Activia pioneered the probiotic spoonable yogurt market.

In 2006, Activia sales reached $130 million, in the US alone. The following year, sales increased by 50% in the US market.

In 2009, sales of Activia reached €2.6 billion globally, with key markets in Europe and the United States. Activia's popularity in the United States is due to the growing public demand for natural products as well as the growing market of probiotics that came into vogue in the late 1990s.

In 2010, Activia dominated the probiotic dairy sector. The success of Activia has increased the health yogurt market.

Activia, Actimel and Danonino accounted for more than half of the total worldwide yogurt sales. Activia is a more than 2 billion-dollar brand which owes its success to the health benefit claim.

In 2011, Activia was the largest global fresh dairy brand in the world (Nielsen data). The probiotic yogurt market is valued at €4 billion.

Activia is present in more than 70 countries and is one of the major brands of the Danone Group.

=== The probiotics market ===
Activia products are considered as functional foods. These foods are enriched with probiotics and provide health benefits when consumed in adequate amounts. The positive effects depend on the specific strain and its dose.

In 2003, the probiotics (also called functional foods) market was worth $9.9 billion. These products are also heavily marketed and more expensive than non-probiotic dairy products.

In 2009, in the United Kingdom, 60% of households regularly bought probiotic drinks. The market there is currently worth £164m per year.

Consumers are willing to pay for products that provide health benefits. Activia products, that are considered as functional foods, are priced higher than other yogurts.

== Communication ==
Since Activia's launch, the Danone Group focused Activia communication on probiotics and health benefits. In 2010, Dannon partnered with actress Jamie Lee Curtis to promote Activia products. These advertisements described Activia as "scientifically proven" to reduce irregularity. According to the brand, Activia "helps regulate your digestive system" when eaten on a daily basis. However, Danone has been accused of deceptive advertising.

After the US litigation and the EU health claims law, and just before the decision of the EFSA on Activia, Danone decided to change communication and marketing for Activia. Advertising no longer mentions health benefits, focusing instead on pleasure and taste. Danone's website contains the text: "Drinking and eating are, first and foremost, a source of pleasure, and while the initial purchase of a product may be motivated by a health benefit, in the majority of cases, a repeat purchase is motivated by the taste".

== Debates surrounding health claims on probiotic foods ==
While indicating Bifidobacterium lactis, the package does not list that Activia also contains strains commonly found in Yogurt: Lactobacillus bulgaricus, Streptococcus thermophilus (that produce high amounts of biogenic amines, poorly tolerated by people with histamine intolerance) and Lactococcus lactis.

Some experts say there is evidence that probiotic strains reduce diarrhea, irritable bowel syndrome and duration of colds. But others argue that their benefits are not certain.

The US FDA pressed charges for false advertising.

According to Danone, Activia is based on 17 scientific studies. But according to CBS News, two of these studies were not statistically significant compared to the placebo groups and six others did not show a statistically significant improvement in transit time.

=== The EU health claims law ===
Since 2007, European Regulation 1924/2006 demands that health food companies come up with the scientific evidence to back their labeling and advertising. Member states are asked to submit health claims from manufacturers who have to wait for the approval of the European Food Safety Authority (EFSA). EFSA verifies all functional foods claims. Most of the time, EFSA rejects companies' claims due to the lack of scientific evidence.

In 2010, following a stream of negative opinions from EFSA for other health claims, Dannon decided to withdraw claims on Activia.

=== Controversies in the United States ===
==== Litigation in 2010 ====
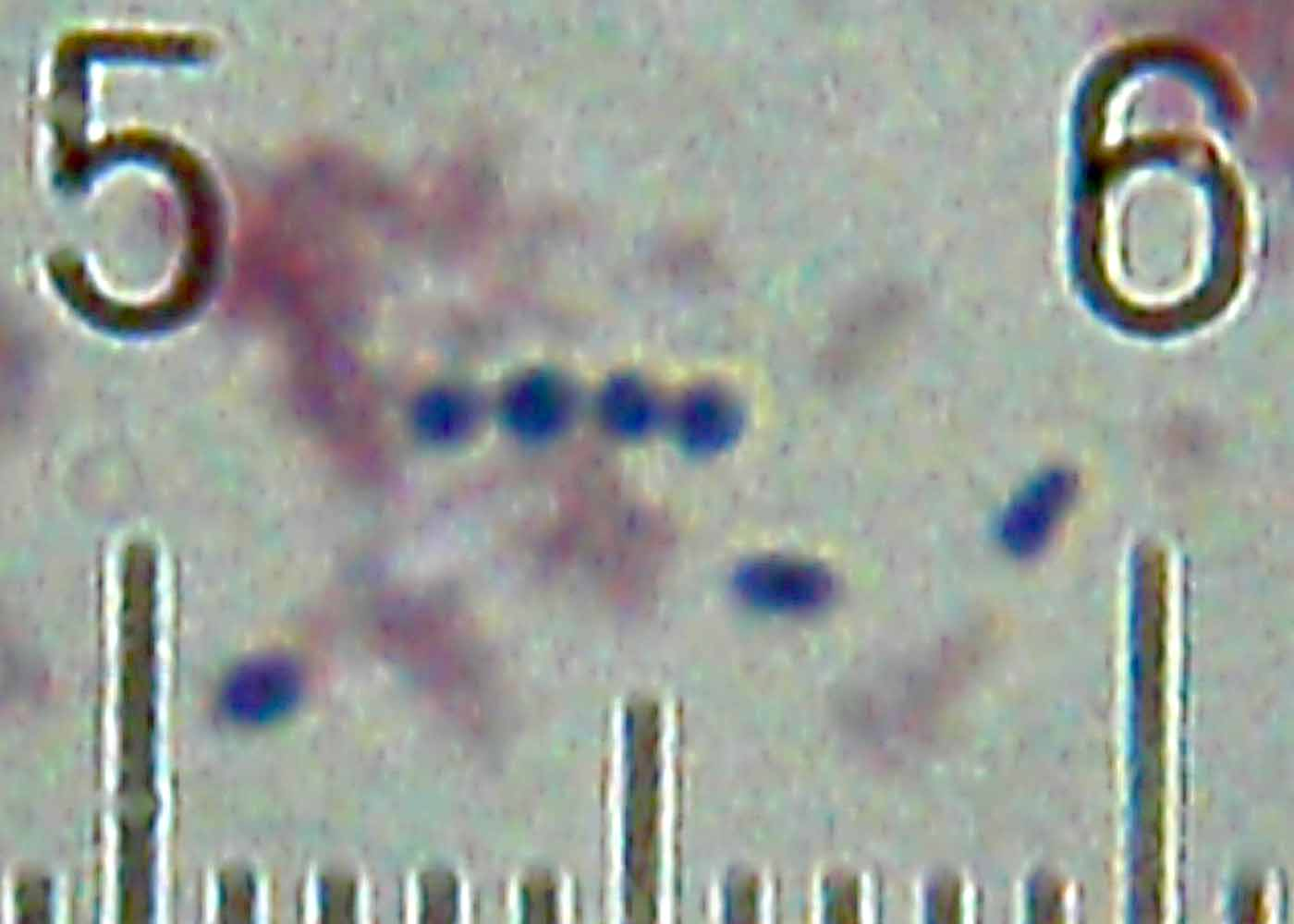
Streptococcus thermophilus, also from the same sample of Activia yogurt. Numbered ticks are 11 micrometres apart.

In its marketing for Activia, Danone claimed that Bifidobacterium animalis relieves irregularity.

In the 2010 Activia TV commercials, a voiceover explains: "Activia eaten every day is clinically proven to help regulate your digestive system in two weeks". Danone said it had scientific evidence to back up its assertions.

But according to the Federal Trade Commission, commercials and claims on Activia packages are deceptive and Danone exaggerates the yogurt's health benefits. In its 2010 charges against Danone, the FTC stated that "Eating one serving of Activia daily is not clinically proven to relieve temporary irregularity and help with slow intestinal transit time". In fact, consumers must eat three servings of Activia each day to obtain health benefits.

In December 2010, The Danone Company settled allegations of false advertising. In the settlement, Danone dropped its claims of the health benefits of its Activia yogurt. The company thus agreed to stop advertising that Activia yogurt improves motility, unless the ad conveys that three servings must be eaten per day to obtain these benefits. Danone therefore removed the words "clinically" and "scientifically proven" from Activia products.

Danone agreed to pay US$21 million to 39 states that had coordinated investigations with the FTC. In response to a similar lawsuit in Canada, Danone agreed to settle the suit by paying compensation and modifying its advertising.

==== Class action in 2008–2009 ====
A class action lawsuit filed in Los Angeles federal court on 25 January 2008, argued that Danone's own studies failed to support its advertised claims. The class action suit accused Danone of mounting a massive false advertising campaign to convince consumers to buy Activia products because of their health benefits.

In a statement in response to the lawsuit, Danone stated that it "strongly disagrees with the allegations in the lawsuit" and that it makes all scientific studies about its products available to the public, following the established method of peer-review and publication. According to the group: "All of Dannon's claims for Activia and DanActive are completely supported by peer-reviewed science and are in accordance with all laws and regulations".

In 2009, as a part of the settlement, Danone agreed to create a $35 million fund to reimburse unsatisfied consumers who had bought its Activia and DanActive yogurts.

Danone spokespeople deny the claims of the lawsuit and admitted no wrongdoing as part of the settlement, and they state that they only agreed to the settlement in order to "avoid the distraction and expense of litigation". As of September 2012, this fund had only paid out about US$1 million in reimbursements to consumers.

=== Litigation in Canada in 2009 ===
In October 2009, Danone was sued in Quebec Superior Court over the nature of the health claims in its advertising. The company had asserted that Activia yogurt could improve digestion or prevent the common cold. In September 2012, the parties elected to settle the case; Danone agreed to modify its advertising claims, but was not forced to admit wrongdoing. Consumers who purchased Activia yogurt between 1 April 2009 and 6 Nov 2012 had 90 days to request compensation between C$15 to C$50, based on the quantity purchased.
