= Köttsoppa =

Meat and vegetable soup

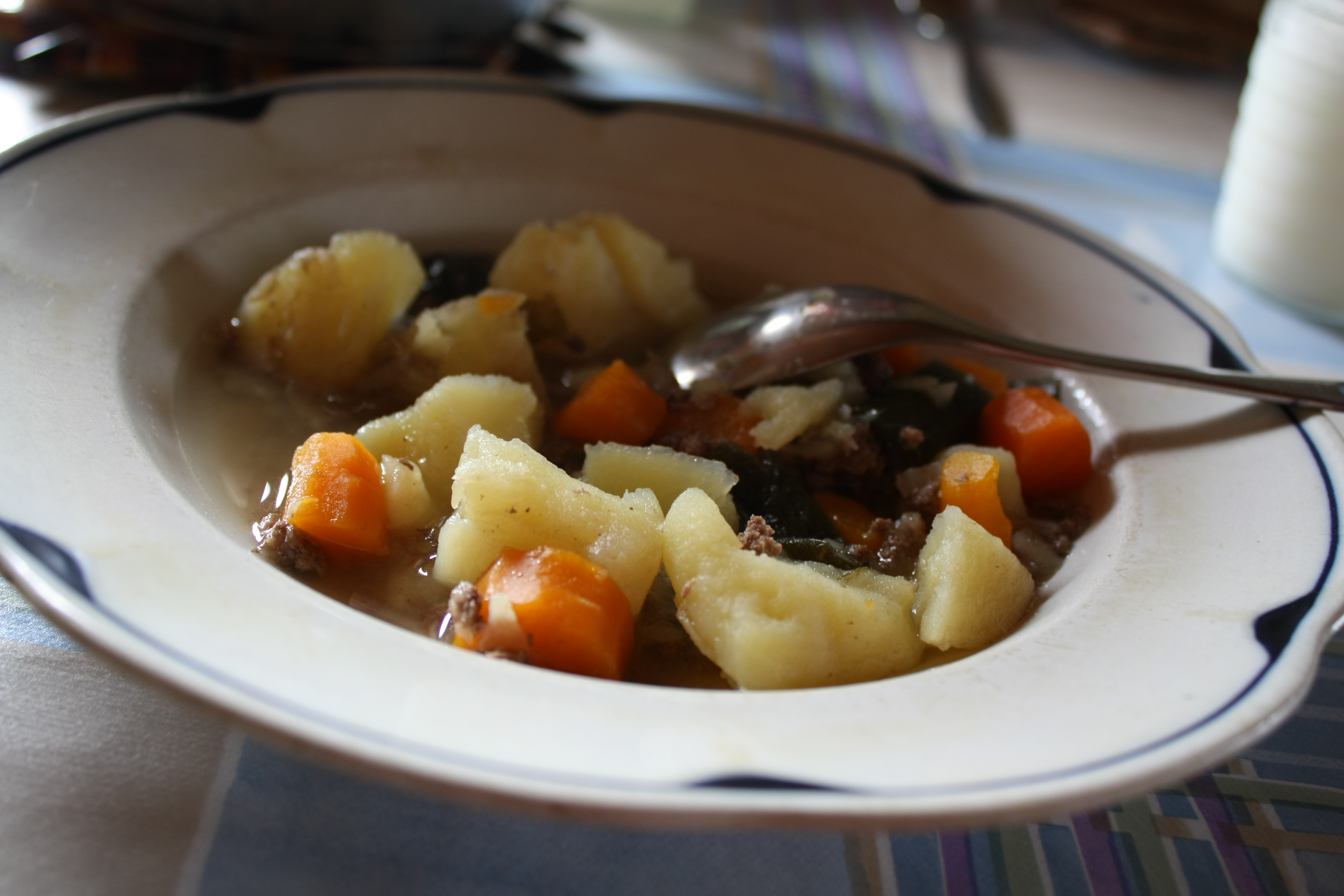
Köttsoppa as eaten in Scandinavia (Norway, Sweden, Finland, Denmark).

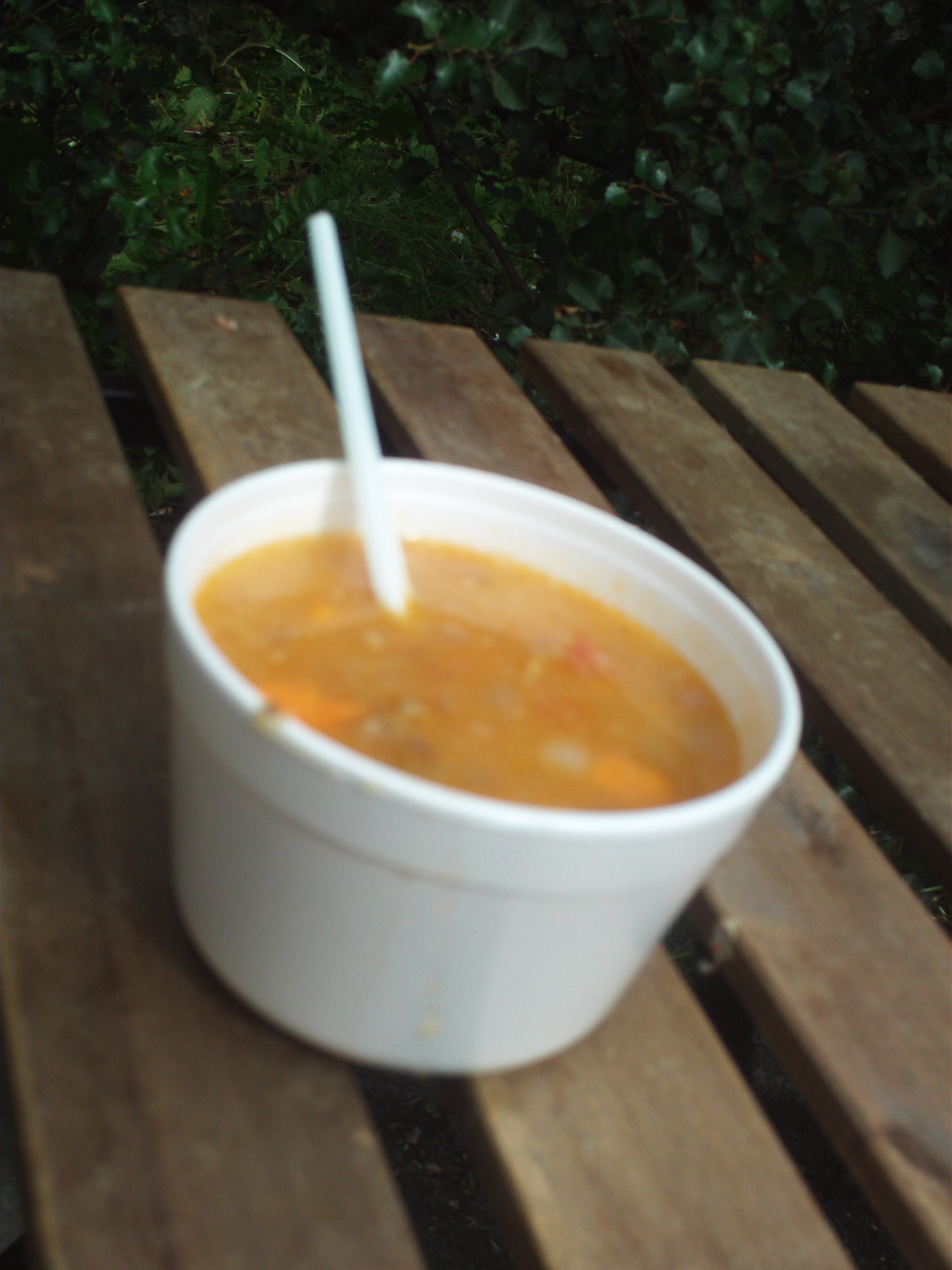
Icelandic kjötsúpa.

Köttsoppa (Swedish: [ˈɕœ̂tːˌsɔpːa]; Finnish: lihakeitto [ˈlihɑˌkei̯tːo]; both lit. 'meat soup') is a clear meat and root vegetable soup eaten in Sweden and Finland. The meat, and the bones supplying the broth, is beef (frequently chuck), or sometimes pork, reindeer or moose. Vegetables commonly used include carrot, potato, celeriac, parsnip, turnip and rutabaga. Green peas and white cabbage is also common. Leek, peppercorns and bay leaves are often added for seasoning. Meat and vegetables are cut to roughly die-sized bits and boiled soft. An Icelandic variety, called íslensk kjötsúpa, typically has lamb with potatoes, carrots and cabbage.

Knäckebröd with aged cheese such as prästost or Svecia is a popular side. Köttsoppa is also sometimes eaten with klimp – simple dumplings the size of ping pong balls made of wheat, milk and egg.
