= Xaa-Pro dipeptidyl-peptidase =

Identifiers
- EC no.: 3.4.14.11
- CAS no.: 54249-88-6

Databases
- IntEnz: IntEnz view
- BRENDA: BRENDA entry
- ExPASy: NiceZyme view
- KEGG: KEGG entry
- MetaCyc: metabolic pathway
- PRIAM: profile
- PDB structures: RCSB PDB PDBe PDBsum
Search
- PMC: articles
- PubMed: articles
- NCBI: proteins

Xaa-Pro dipeptidyl-peptidase (EC 3.4.14.11, X-prolyl dipeptidyl aminopeptidase, PepX, X-prolyl dipeptidyl peptidase is an enzyme. It catalyses the following chemical reaction

Hydrolyses Xaa-Pro bonds to release unblocked, N-terminal dipeptides from substrates including Ala-Pro-p-nitroanilide and (sequentially) Tyr-Pro--Phe-Pro--Gly-Pro--Ile

The intracellular enzyme from Lactococcus lactis (190-kDa) is the type example of peptidase family S15.
