= Cyril V. Pink =

British obstetrician and writer (1894-1965)

- Born: 1894
- Died: 1965 (aged 70–71)
- Occupations: Obstetrician, writer

Cyril Valentine Pink (1894–1965) M.R.C.S., L.R.C.P. was a British obstetrician, naturopath, Theosophist, and vegetarianism activist. Pink was an early medical advocate of natural childbirth. He was the co-founder of Stonefield Maternity Home and was a disciple of Maximilian Bircher-Benner.

== Biography ==
Pink qualified MRCS and LRCP in 1917 from St Thomas' Hospital. He was House Surgeon at St. Thomas Hospital and General Lying-in Hospital, York Road. In 1920, Pink co-founded Stonefield Maternity Home in Blackheath, London with Dr. William H. White. Pink was a specialist in obstetrics for many years at Stonefield Maternity Home. He conducted clinical trials on babies at Great Ormond Street Children's Hospital and the Stonefield Maternity Home.

Pink was concerned about animal welfare and was an anti-vivisectionist. He defended naturopathy and was influenced by the dietary views of Maximilian Bircher-Benner.

Pink was a theosophist and lectured at Bath Theosophical Lodge. He admitted he was on the fringe when it came to medicine and held unorthodox opinions about disease. For example, he believed in the existence of etheric matter that forms part of the physical body but etheric dirt can damage the etheric body. Pink believed that infectious diseases were the result of etheric dirt damaging the etheric body from disobedience of nature's laws. He advocated methods of natural hygiene such as consuming a vegetarian diet, drinking water, keeping good sanitation and taking in pure air.

His brother Wilfred Langrish Pink was an otolaryngologist in South Africa.

== Vegetarianism ==
At Stonefield Maternity Home, Pink advised all his patients to be vegetarian. Pink promoted a lacto-vegetarian diet rich in fruit and uncooked vegetables as a matter of routine in pregnancy. He argued that vitamin B is best obtained from wholemeal bread and wheat germ. He stated that a vegetarian diet offered a high degree of immunity from two serious complications of childbirth, toxemia of pregnancy (pre-eclampsia) and sepsis. He reported successful results of children doing well on a plant-based diet under his care that were featured in The Vegan magazine.

Pink lectured on vegetarianism. In 1939, he became President of the Croydon Vegetarian Society. He was Secretary of the Somerset Vegetarian Society.

== Selected publications ==
- The Ideal Management of Pregnancy (1930)
- The Foundations of Motherhood (1941)
- Mother Child and Diet (1947)
- Your Child and Diet (1950)
- Status of Naturopathy (1951)
- Homeopathy and Obstetrics (1953)
- Spiritual Healing in Hospitals (1960)
- Yoga and the Heart (1961)
- Feeding the Vegetarian Baby (with Mrs. Cyril, 1962)
