= Foodwatch =

European advocacy group for consumer rights

- Founded: 2002
- Founder: Thilo Bode
- Purpose: Consumer rights
- Location: Berlin
- Region served: Europe
- Key people: Jörg Rohwedder, president
- Website: foodwatch.eu

Foodwatch is a European advocacy group that focuses on protecting consumer rights as they pertain to food quality. The organization was founded in October 2002 in Berlin by former Greenpeace executive director Thilo Bode. As of 2020, the organization is active in Germany, the Netherlands, France and Austria. Foodwatch International, while handled as a separate unit, is legally a part of the German foodwatch association.

In 2008, the organization reported that uranium concentrations in German tap water exceeded the permitted levels.

An important aspect of Foodwatch's activities consists of investigating manufacturer claims in marketing campaigns and on packaging. Each year Foodwatch delivers the Goldener Windbeutel (German)/Gouden Windei (Dutch), given to the product whose packaging is the most misleading, as voted on by visitors to the website. In 2009 the award went to Actimel. In the 2012 campaign, Foodwatch criticized Becel pro-active, a Unilever product which is supposed to lower the risk of coronary disease. Foodwatch demanded Unilever stop selling the product, leading to considerable scrutiny of the product and countercriticism by the manufacturer.
