= Muesli =

Breakfast dish based on raw rolled oats

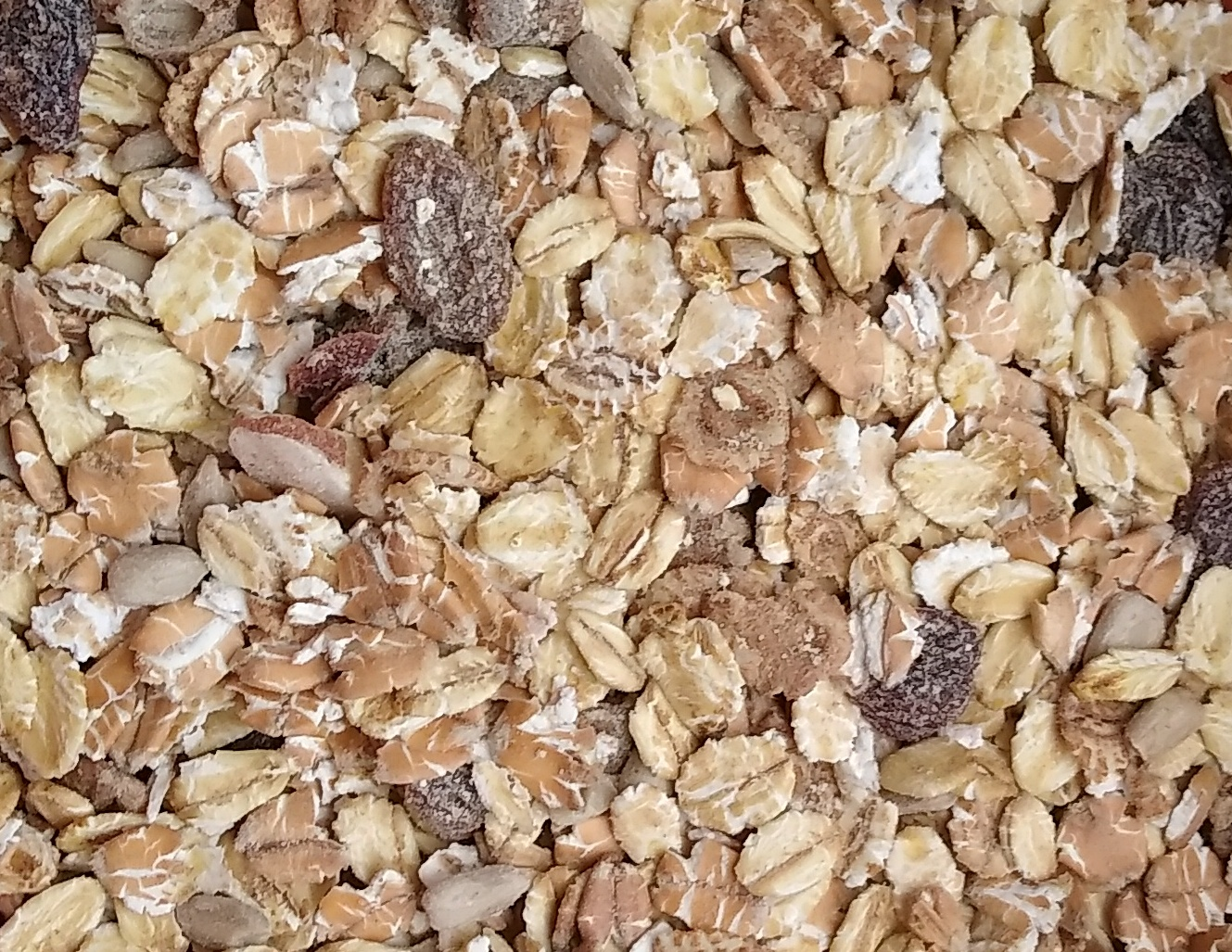
- Commercial muesli mix
- Alternative names: Overnight oats
- Type: Cereal
- Course: Breakfast
- Place of origin: Switzerland
- Region or state: Zurich
- Created by: Maximilian Bircher-Benner
- Invented: c. 1900
- Main ingredients: Rolled oats, water
- Similar dishes: Granola

Muesli (/ˈmjuːzli/ MEWZ-lee) is a cold Swiss dish that has become a common breakfast cereal prepared without cooking. Developed around 1900 by Swiss physician Maximilian Bircher-Benner for patients in his hospital in Switzerland, it is also consumed for supper as Birchermüesli complet, 'Bircher's complete little mush', i.e., muesli with café complet (milk coffee accompanied by Butterbrot (bread, butter and jam)).

Traditionally, the primary ingredient in muesli is rolled oats which have not been processed further. The original preparation was to soak the oats in water overnight (now commonly called "overnight oats") and eat them the next morning with fresh apple, nuts, lemon juice, and sweetened condensed milk. Over time, variations became commonplace, including the substitution of other citrus juices, the combining of additional ingredients, such as grains, seeds, and fresh and dried fruits, and the addition of yogurt, milk or other milk products or milk substitutes. These additions and substitutions are considered common ingredients in both homemade and commercially packaged muesli recipes.

Modern commercial brands market muesli that is toasted. If it is processed further, by adding sweetener and oil to bind the ingredients together and baked, it is granola.

== Etymology ==
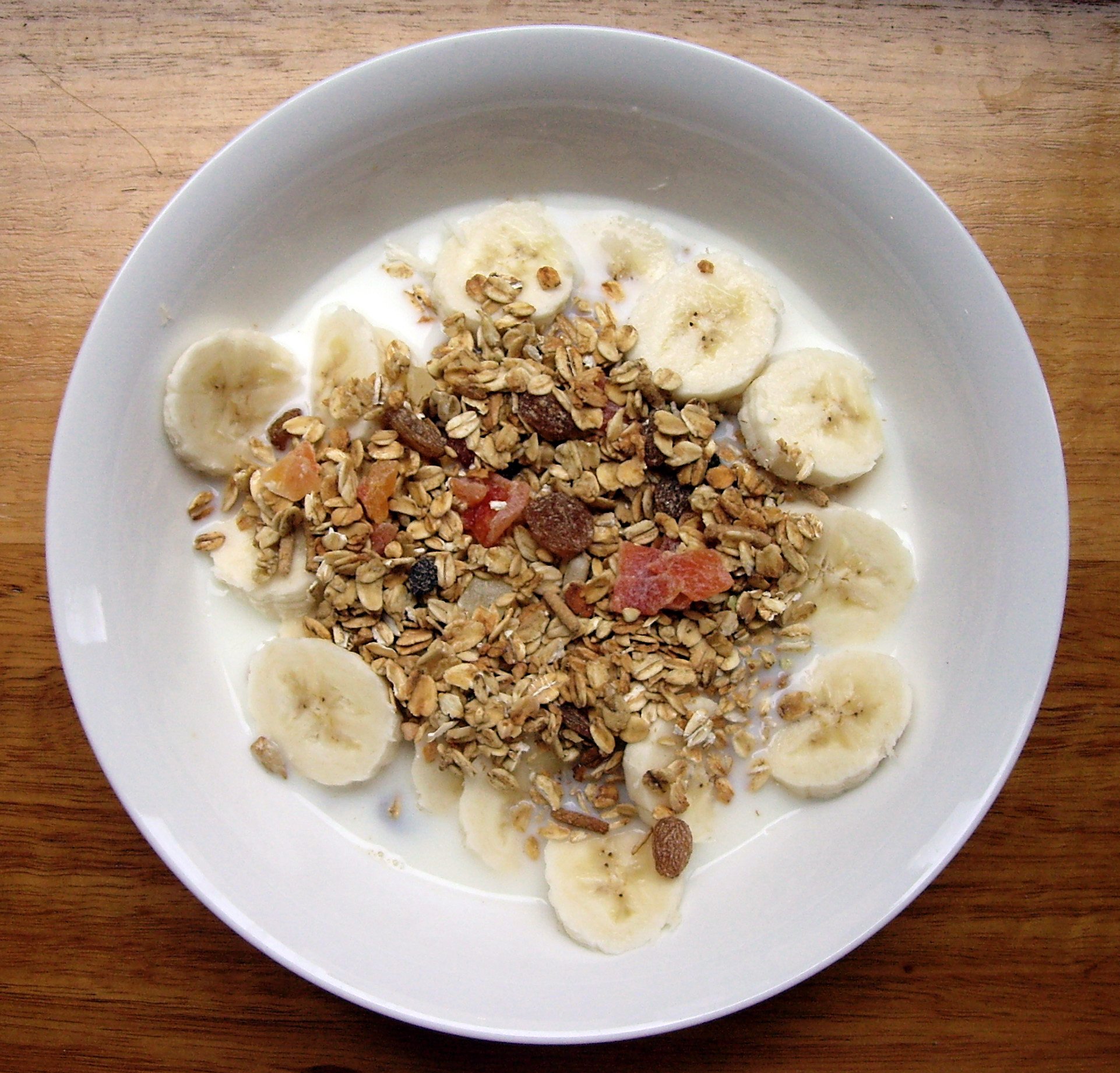
A dry muesli mix served with milk and sliced fresh banana

Originally known in Swiss German as Birchermüesli after its creator Bircher-Benner, the word Müesli is an Alemannic diminutive of Mues (non-Swiss Standard German: Mus) meaning 'mush' or 'purée'.

== History ==
Muesli was not originally intended as a breakfast food, but as an appetiser similar to bread and butter. It was consumed as Schweizer Znacht (lit. 'Swiss supper'), but not as a breakfast cereal.

It was introduced around 1900 by Bircher-Benner for patients in his hospital, where a diet rich in fresh fruit and vegetables was an essential part of therapy. It was inspired by a similar "strange dish" that he and his wife had been served on a hike in the Swiss Alps.

Bircher-Benner himself referred to the dish simply as d Spys, Swiss German for "the dish" (German: die Speise); it was commonly known as Apfeldiätspeise (lit. 'Apple Diet Meal'). Bircher opened a chalet-style sanitorium on Zürichberg called Lebendige Kraft (lit. 'lively power'). These facilities had risen in popularity during the era of lebensreform, a social movement which valued health foods and vegetarianism.

While long popular in mainland Europe, muesli has grown more popular since the 2010s in the UK and United States as "overnight oats", based on its ease of preparation, good taste and potential to be healthy depending on ingredients.

== Recipes ==
=== Original Bircher-Benner recipe ===
The original Bircher-Benner recipe consists of the following ingredients:

- Apples: "two or three small apples or one large one". The whole apple was to be used, including skin, core, and pips. (Note: This means "seeds" and is not advisable according to modern health advice.)
- Nuts, either walnuts, almonds, or hazelnuts: 1 tablespoon.
- Rolled oats: 1 tablespoon, "previously soaked in 3 tablespoons water for 12 hours".
- Lemon juice: from half a lemon.
- Either cream and honey, or sweetened condensed milk: 1 tablespoon.

The dish was prepared by mixing the cream and honey or condensed milk with the soaked oats and lemon juice and, while stirring, grating the whole apple into the mixture. This method prevented the apple pulp from browning. The intent was to serve the dish fresh, immediately before any other dishes in the meal.

=== Fresh muesli ===
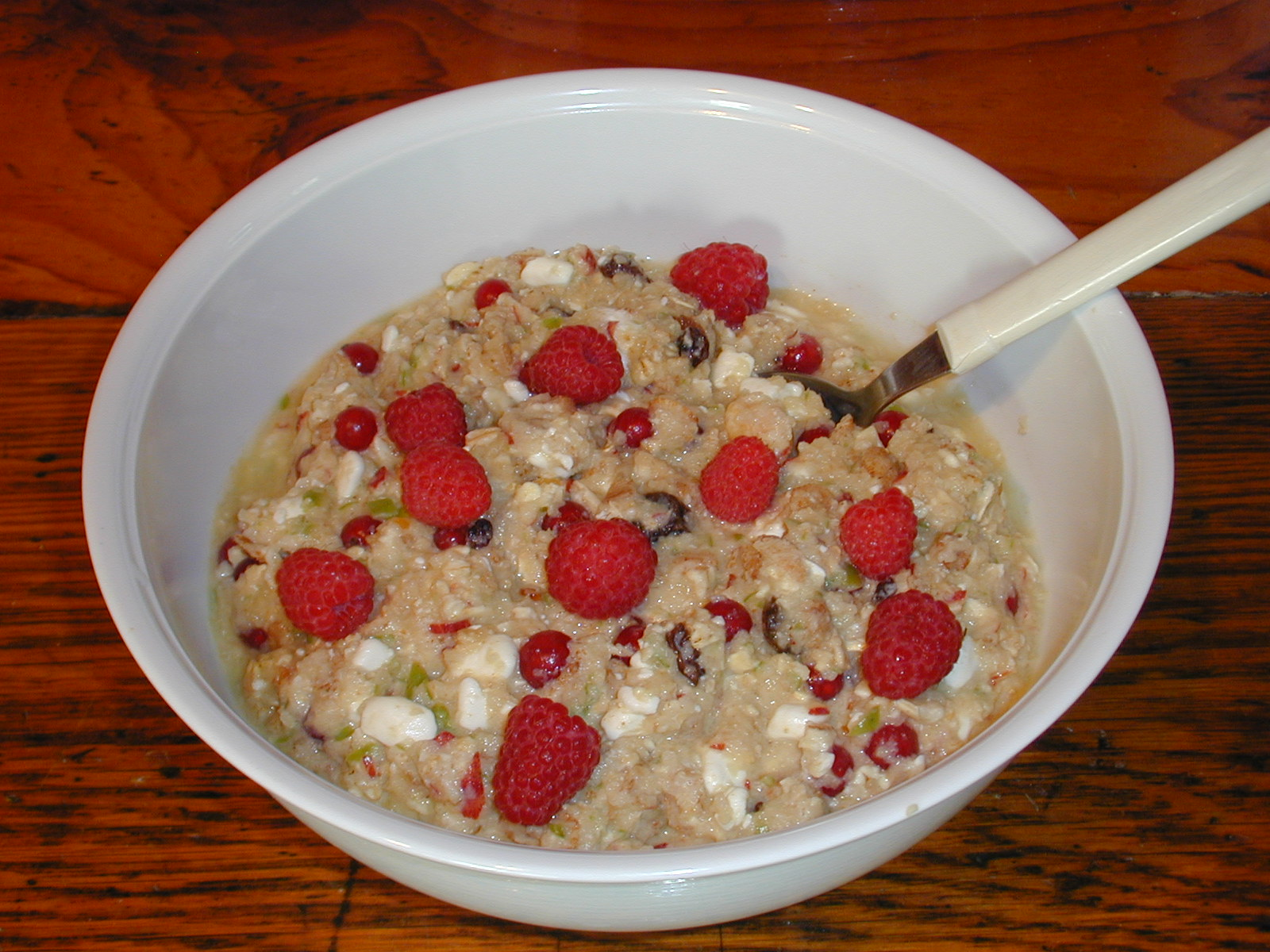
Fresh muesli, made using rolled oats, orange juice, blended apple and banana, redcurrants, raisins and cottage cheese, topped with raspberries

Muesli traditionally is freshly prepared using dried rolled oats or whole grain oats that have been soaked in water or fruit juice. Other common ingredients are grated or chopped fresh fruit (e.g., bananas, apples, berries, grapes, mango), dried fruit, milk products (e.g., fresh milk, yoghurt, cream, condensed milk, fromage frais, quark, cottage cheese) or nondairy milk substitutes, lemon juice, ground nuts, seeds, spices (especially cinnamon), honey and muesli mix.

The preparation of home-made muesli varies according to the tastes and preferences of the cook, but the basic proportions are around 80% grain, 10% nuts and seeds and 10% dried fruits. Some home cooks prefer to mix the dry ingredients ahead of time and store a batch of it in a container, adding wet ingredients such as fresh fruit, dairy products, honey and fruit juice immediately before serving.

=== Packaged muesli ===
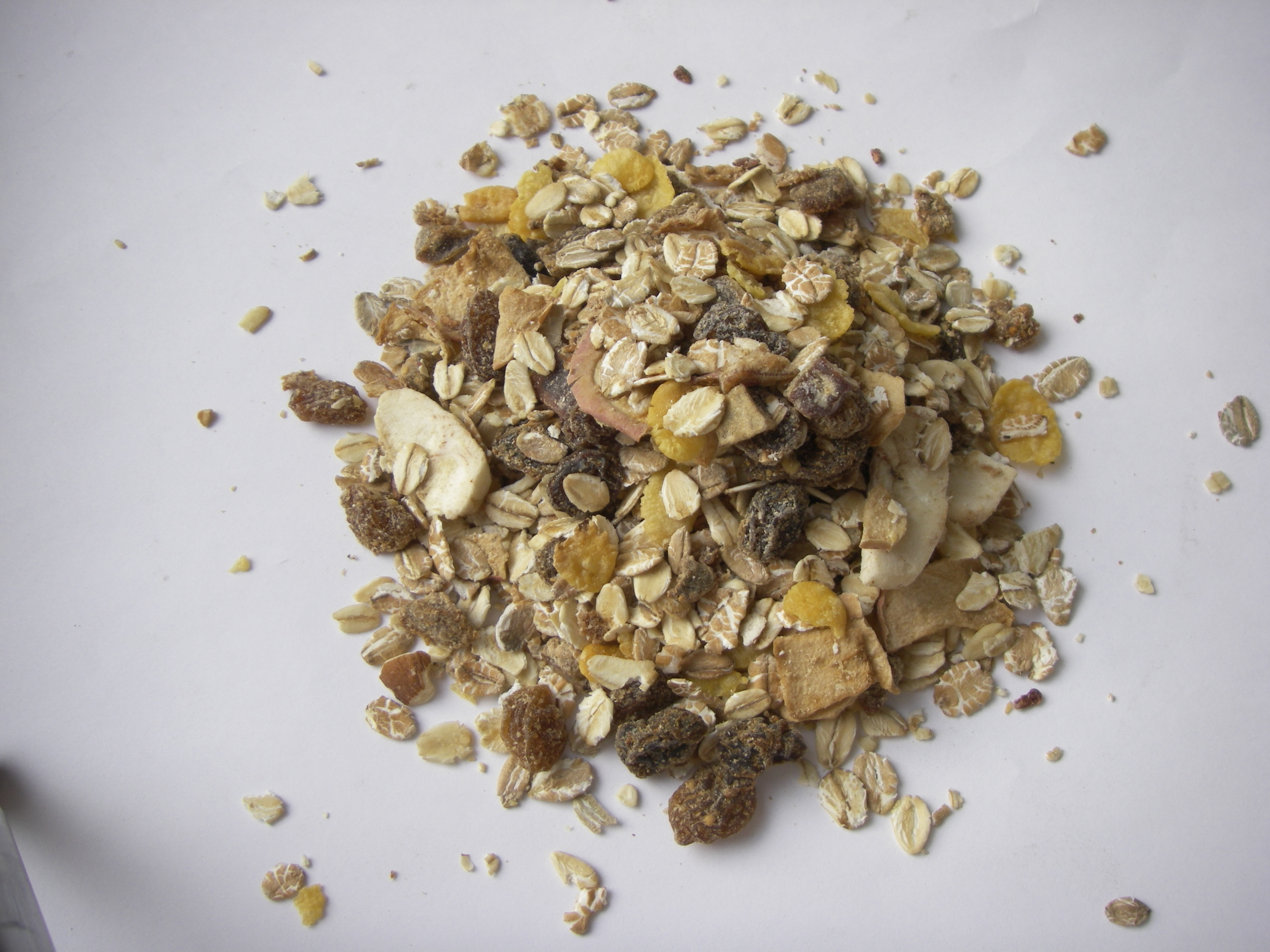
Unprepared mix with seeds and raisins

Packaged muesli is a loose mixture of mainly rolled oats or cornflakes together with various dried fruit pieces, nuts, and seeds – the main ingredients of any muesli. It commonly contains other rolled cereal grains such as wheat or rye flakes.

There are many varieties, which may also contain honey, spices, or chocolate. Dry packaged muesli can be kept for many months and served quickly after mixing with milk, filmjölk, yogurt, coffee, hot chocolate, fruit juice or water. If desired, pieces of fresh fruit may be added. Alternatively, the mix may be soaked overnight in milk and then served with fresh fruit or compote to taste.

=== Cultural specifics ===
==== English-speaking world adaptation ====
Cafes, restaurants and chefs in the English-speaking world often use the label Bircher muesli to distinguish their dishes from the store-bought variety, indicating it has been prepared in a manner based on the original recipe – with grated fresh apple, lemon juice, cream and honey – rather than just being poured from a packet and having milk added. However, these dishes are usually a marked modification of the original recipe rather than a faithful reproduction. Many use orange or apple juice instead of lemon juice, and add other more exotic ingredients such as berries, grated fresh pears, poached or roasted fruit, vanilla essence and agave syrup.

== Research ==
Regular muesli consumption has been associated with a lower body mass index and less risk of being overweight. A 2025 analysis found that muesli consumption was significantly associated with reduced total and cause-specific mortality risks. Muesli is recommended by the British Heart Foundation as a cholesterol-lowering food.

== See also ==
- Alpen (food)
