= Rye flakes =

Rolled rye groats

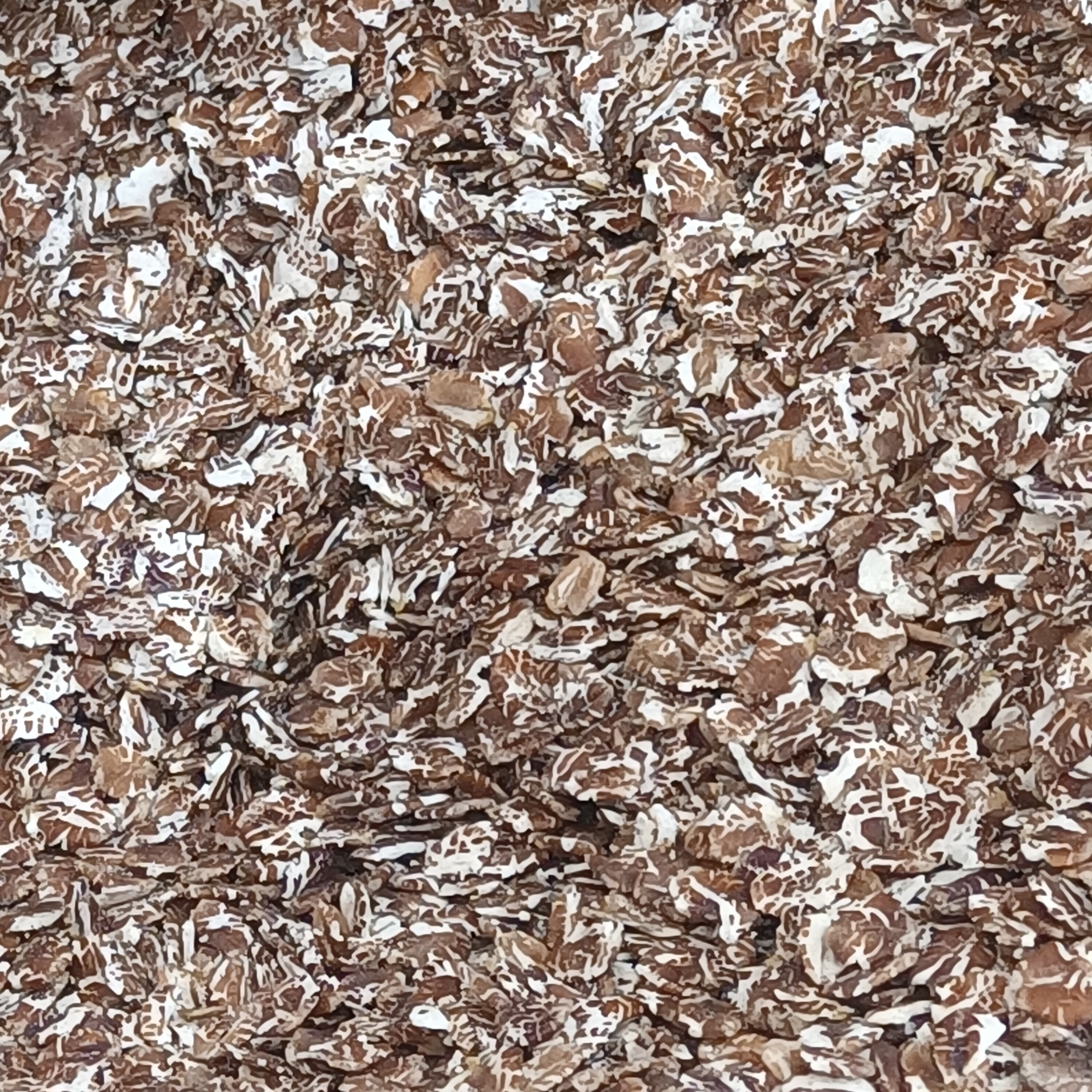
Hebei Rye flakes

Rye flakes are made from rye groats which are steamed and rolled into a flake. They may be added to soups, stews, cakes and breads.

== About ==
Rye flakes are produced by collecting rye, roasting it on a gas fire, and then rolling it into flakes. It is most commonly eaten as hot cereal. Other recipes that call for rye flakes include granola, muesli, creamy soups, stews, desserts, pie crusts, and baked goods. They are one-hundred percent whole grain, thus making them very high in fiber and manganese.
