= Actimel =

Probiotic yoghurt drink

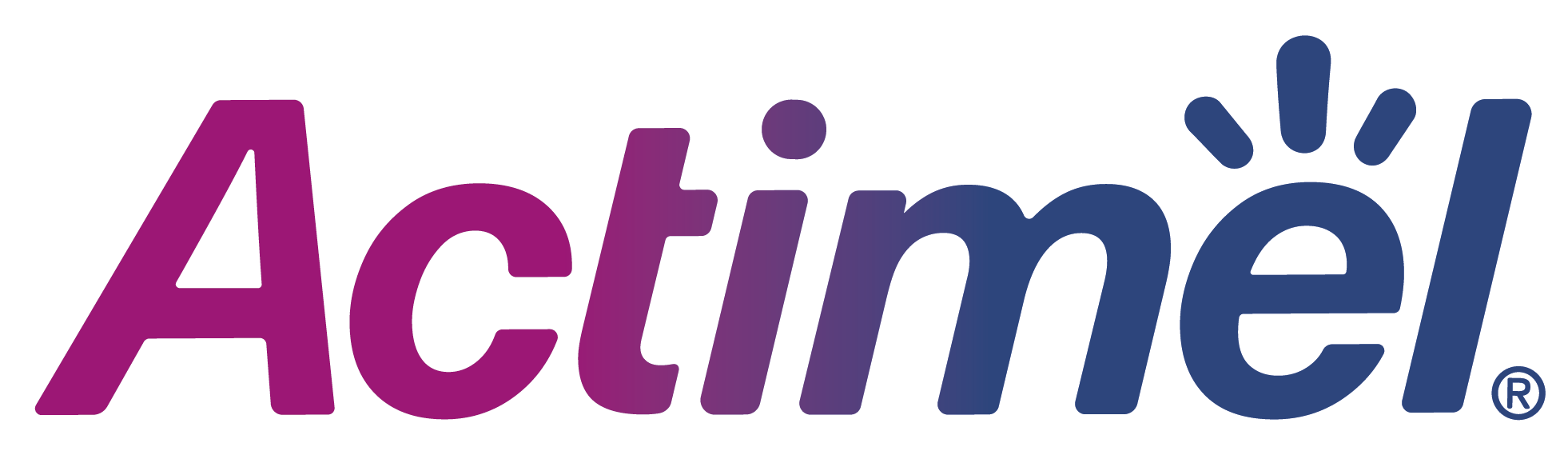

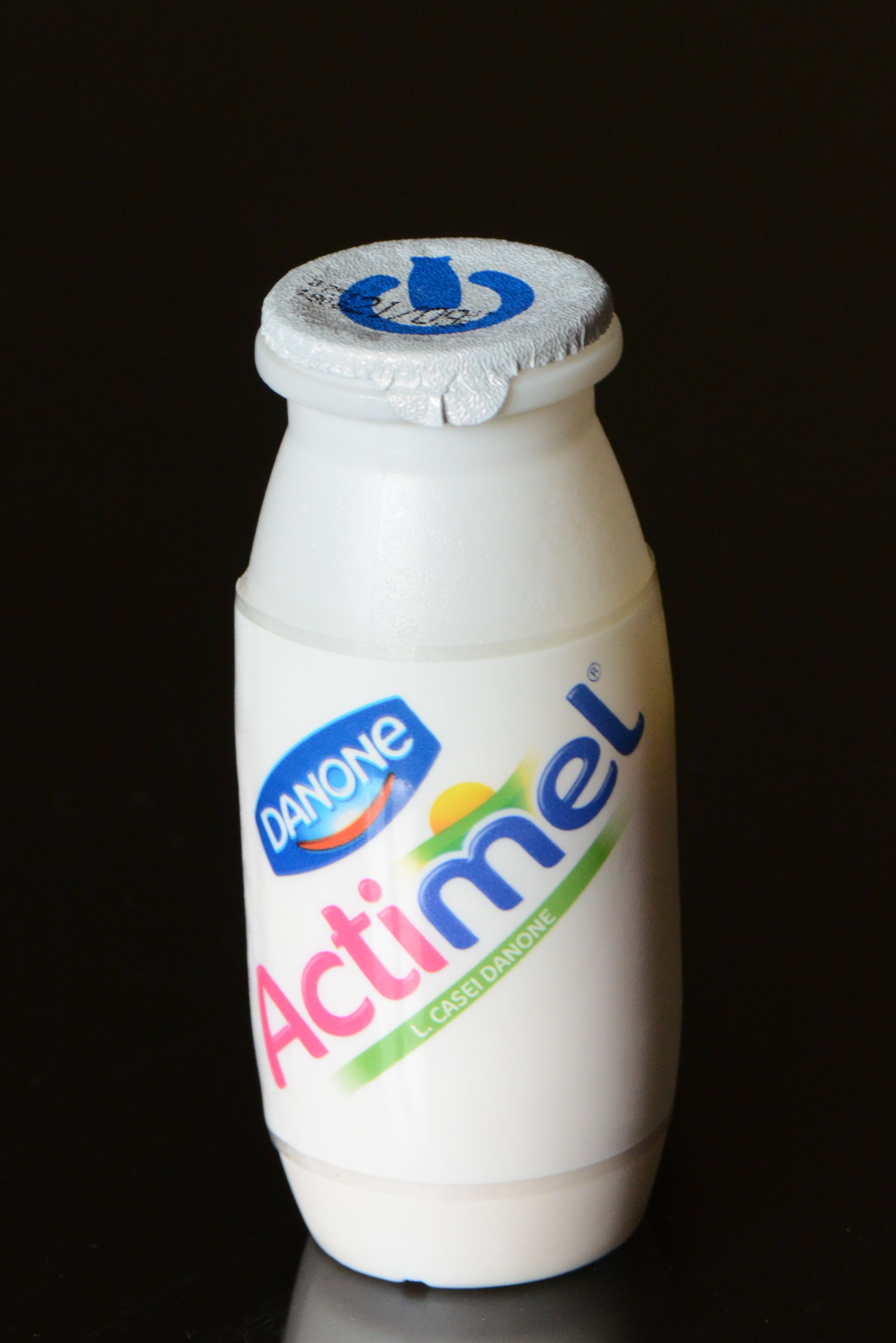
- Product type: Probiotic dairy
- Current owner: Danone
- Introduced: 1994; 32 years ago
- Related brands: Activia
- Markets: Worldwide actimel.com

Actimel (known as DanActive in the United States and Canada) is a probiotic yoghurt-type drink produced by the French company Danone.

Actimel earned over €1.4 billion (US$1.8 billion) in retail sales in 2006.

== History ==
Actimel was invented in the 1980s when the first steps to developing a fermented milk based on Lactobacillus casei had already been taken. It was not commercially launched in Belgium until 1994. The word Actimel was derived from the Dutch “actieve melk”, meaning “active milk”.

== Scientific basis ==
Claimed benefits range from reducing the incidence of diarrhea and rhinitis reduction for young children, to improvement of the immune function in adults and elderly people and reduction of duration of winter infections for elderly.

A 2007 study published by the British Medical Journal suggests that the product could help avoid antibiotic-associated diarrhoea and limit Clostridioides difficile infections in elderly patients.

== Debates surrounding health claims on probiotic foods ==
On 23 January 2008, a proposed class action was filed in California, accusing Danone Co. Inc. of false advertising in their marketing of yoghurt containing probiotic bacteria (Danactive & Activia), alleging that the claimed health benefits have never been proven. The company has denied this accusation.

Foodwatch claims that Danone "makes a mountain out of a molehill" in suggesting that Actimel protects from cold and boosts health. Foodwatch believes that the company sells a commodity product as a niche product using branding.

The Advertising Standards Authority (ASA) is an independent regulator for advertisements, sales promotion and direct marketing in the UK. According to Spiegel Online one TV spot from Actimel was blocked by the ASA in 2006 and one in 2008. In the first case the ASA upheld a complaint that the advert misleadingly implied that children given Actimel would be prevented from catching bacterial infections. Meanwhile in the second case complaints about the use of the phrase "Actimel is scientifically proven, and you can see that proof for yourself on our website" were upheld as only summaries of, or references to, these studies were present on the website and the full content was not available. A TV advert that stated that Actimel was "scientifically-proven to help support your kids' defences" was banned by the Advertising Standards Authority.

Alexa Meyer, from the Department of Nutritional Sciences, University of Vienna, Austria, comparing probiotic drinks and normal yoghurt, found no significant difference in the effect of Actimel and normal yoghurt with living bacteria. The nutritional researcher recommends getting enough sleep, washing hands often and eating a daily bowl of yoghurt. She says this would activate more active germ-fighting white blood cells, enhancing the immune system, probably due to the presence of Lactobacillus bulgaricus, from any normal yoghurt, which is half the price of Actimel.

The equivalence of yoghurts is supported by Berthold Koletzko from LMU Munich, Metabolic Diseases and Nutrition. In case of diarrhoea, Koletzko advises parents to give their children yoghurt with living bacteria. It does not necessarily need to be Actimel, but may also be other yoghurts. A measurable health benefit linked to the presence of live Streptococcus thermophilus and Lactobacillus delbrueckii subsp. bulgaricus in yoghurt was reported by Koletzko and colleagues in 2005. In this review Koletzko and colleagues say that it was clearly demonstrated that yoghurt containing viable bacteria improves lactose digestion and eliminates symptoms of lactose intolerance, and clearly fulfill the current concept of probiotics.

The net "all-cause" effects of yoghurts have also been questioned; its 6 September 2009 issue, Nature featured an article by Didier Raoult who claimed that "probiotic-enriched" yoghurt beverages may have contributed to the increase in obesity over the past 20 years.

In 2007, a health claims regulation was put in place by the European Commission within the 27 countries of the European Union, and a similar regulation came into consideration at Health Canada.
