= Lactococcus virus P008 =

Virus classification
- (unranked): Virus
- Realm: Duplodnaviria
- Kingdom: Heunggongvirae
- Phylum: Uroviricota
- Class: Caudoviricetes
- Order: Caudovirales
- Family: Siphoviridae
- Genus: Sk1virus
- Species: Lactococcus virus P008

Species of virus

Lactococcus virus P008 is a phage specific to Lactococcus lactis, a lactic acid bacteria used in the first stage of making cheese. P008 and related species are responsible for important loss each year in cheese factories.
