= Västerbotten cheese =

Swedish hard cheese

Coordinates: 64.5209°N 20.6554°E

Västerbotten
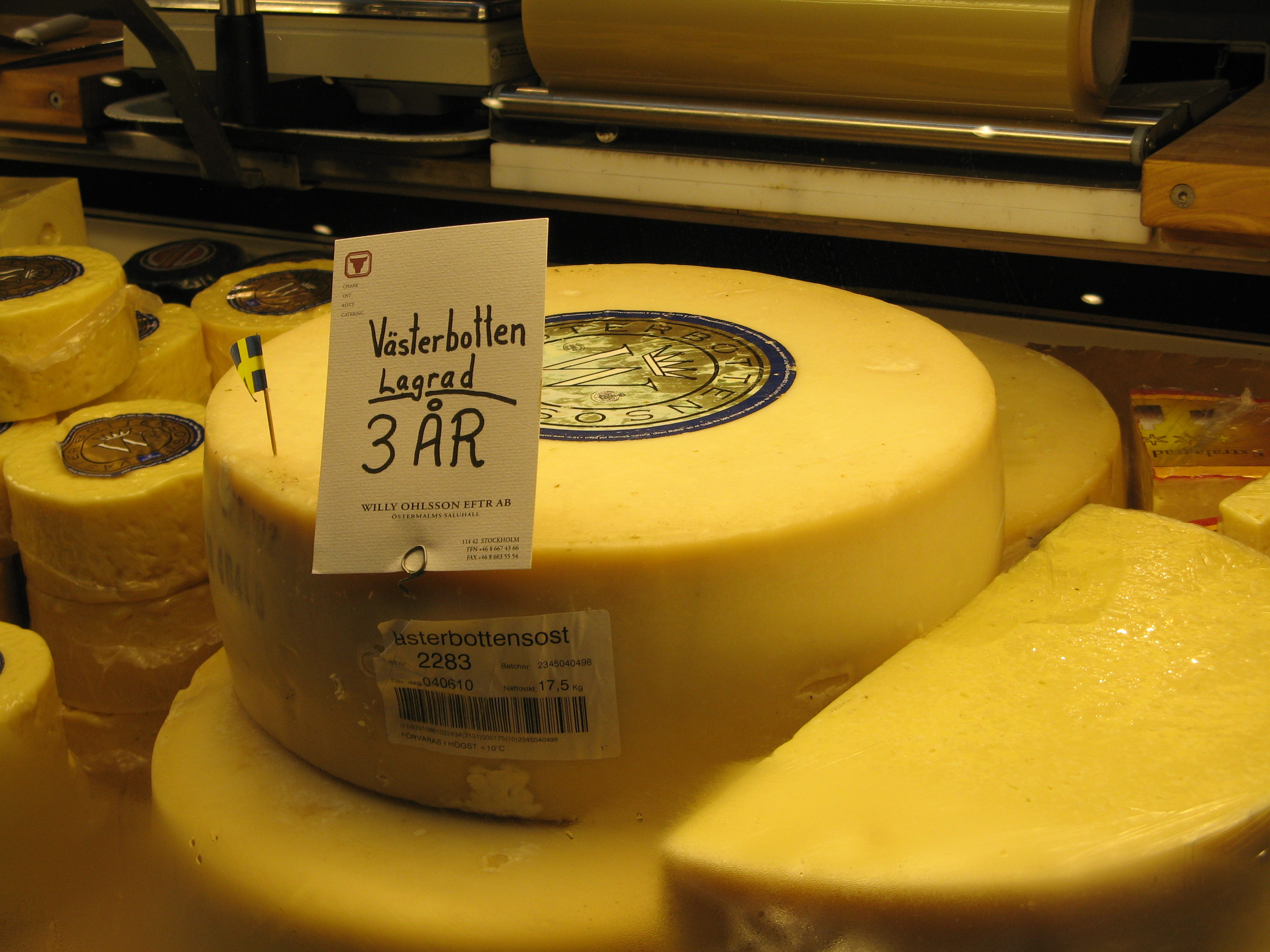
- Other names: Västerbottensost
- Country of origin: Sweden
- Region, town: Västerbotten
- Source of milk: Cows
- Texture: Hard
- Aging time: One year or more

Västerbotten cheese (Swedish: Västerbottensost [ˈvɛ̂sːtɛrbɔtːɛnsˌʊst]) is a cheese from the Västerbotten region of Sweden. It is a hard cow's milk cheese with tiny eyes or holes and a firm and granular texture. As in Cheddar cheese, the curd is heated, cut, and stirred before the cheese is moulded and aged. Strong in flavour, its taste is described as somewhat like Parmesan cheese, salty, but with more bitter notes. It is light yellow in colour and has a fat content of 31%. Västerbotten cheese must be aged for at least 12 months, but 14 months is more common practice.

Many Swedish people consider it the king of cheeses, and demand for it has often outstripped the limited supply. It has also been served as part of the Nobel Dinner, and other Royal dinners. A common dish utilising it is Västerbottensostpaj, literally "Västerbotten cheese pie", with filling consisting of Västerbotten cheese, cream, eggs, and black pepper. The pie is eaten widely in Sweden, especially during the celebrations of Christmas, Easter, Midsummer and during the crayfish season in August.

== History ==
The village of Burträsk (now part of the Skellefteå municipality) claims Västerbotten cheese was invented there in the 1870s, supposedly by a dairy maid, Ulrika Eleonora Lindström (1835–1892). Västerbottencheese and västerbottensost are registered trademarks owned by Norrmejerier, and the cheese is produced only at their dairy in Burträsk.

== See also ==
- Swedish cuisine

== Other sources ==
- Fox, Patrick (1999). Cheese: Chemistry, Physics, and Microbiology. Volume 2: Major Cheese Groups. Springer. ISBN 0-8342-1339-7.
