= Prästost =

Swedish cheese

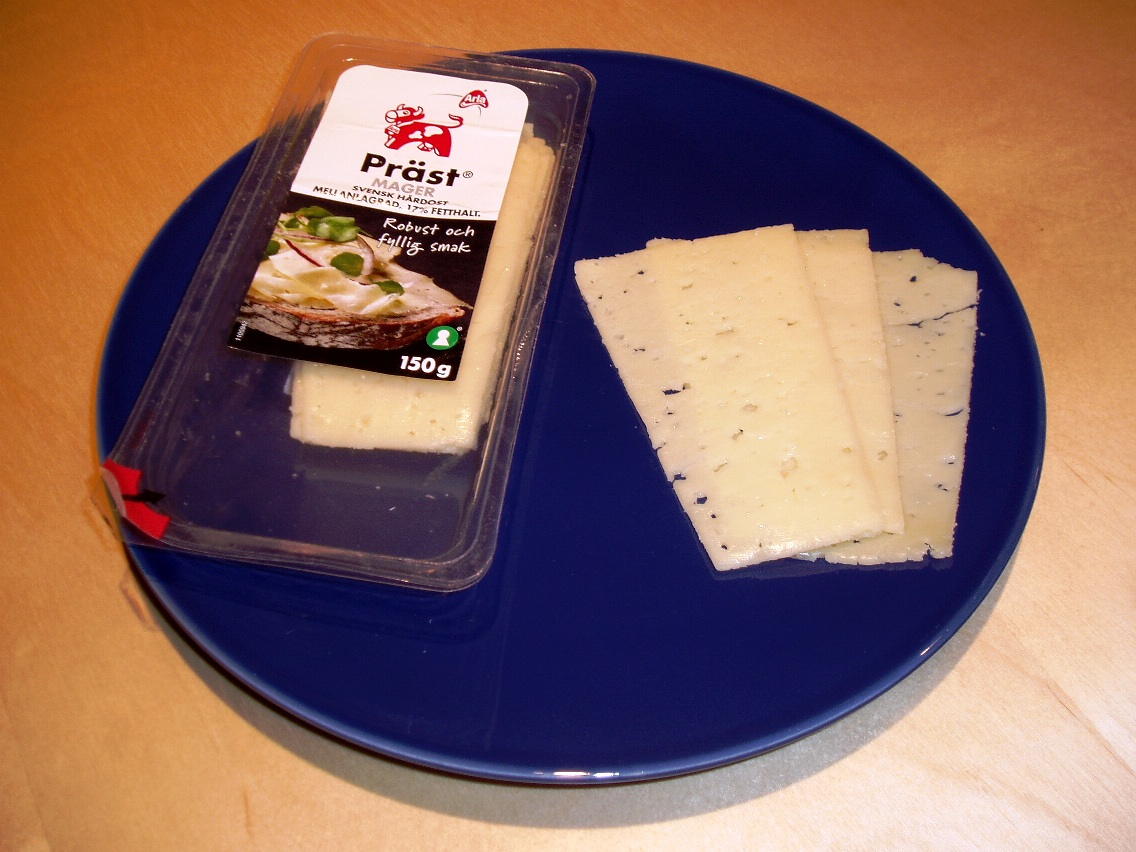
A package of Präst cheese

Prästost ("priest cheese") is a Swedish cheese with historical roots in Sweden's one-time custom of paying tithes with agricultural goods including milk. Milk spoils easily so most farms instead produced a small eyed cheese that had its curing process started by mixing in a small batch of fermented curds. This was common practice from the 16th through 19th centuries. Today, this style of cheese once produced in churches across Sweden is factory-made from pasteurized cow's milk. Prästost is marketed under the trademark Präst, which was registered in 2001 and is owned by the company Svenska Ostklassiker AB, a subsidiary of Svensk Mjölk.

In Sweden, Prästost is produced by Arla Foods (under the Arla brand and the Falbygdens Ost brand), Skånemejerier (under the Skånemejerier brand and the Allerum brand) and Wernersson Ost. It is also sold at Lidl under Lidl's own brand name Matriket.
