= Maximilian Bircher-Benner =

Swiss physician (1867–1939)

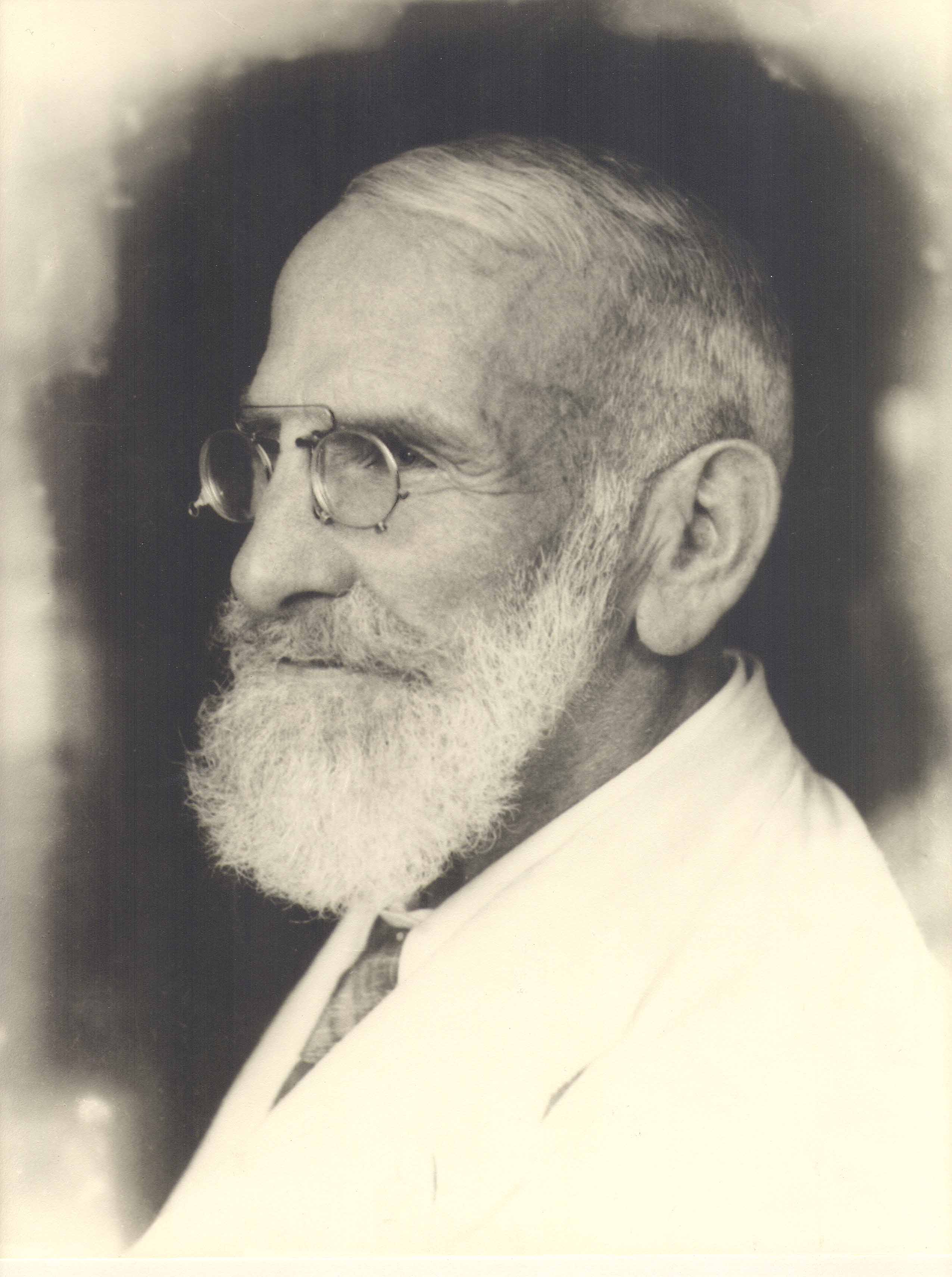
- Born: Maximilian Oskar Bircher-Benner; 22 August 1867; Aarau, Switzerland
- Died: 24 January 1939 (aged 71); Zürich, Switzerland
- Occupations: Physician, nutritionist
- Known for: Creating muesli
- Works: Food Science for All

Maximilian Oskar Bircher-Benner, M.D. (22 August 1867 – 24 January 1939) was a Swiss physician and a pioneer nutritionist credited for popularizing muesli and raw food vegetarianism.

== Biography ==
Maximilian Oskar Bircher-Benner was born on 22 August 1867 in Aarau, Switzerland, to Heinrich Bircher and Berta Krüsi. He attended the University of Zurich to study medicine, and later opened his own general clinic.

During the first year the clinic was open, Bircher-Benner developed jaundice, and he claimed he recovered by eating raw apples. From this observation, he experimented with the health effects raw foods have on the body, and from this he promoted muesli; a dish based on raw oats, fruits and nuts. Bircher-Benner expanded on his nutritional research and opened a sanatorium called "Vital Force" in 1897. He believed raw fruits and vegetables held the most nutritional value, cooked and commercially processed foods held even less, and meat held the least nutritional value. Eventually, Bircher-Benner gave up meat entirely and became a vegetarian. Other scientists of the time did not respond well to what Bircher-Benner referred to as his "new food science," but it was sufficiently popular with the general public that he expanded his sanatorium practice.

Bircher-Benner's nutritional habits and eating patterns steadily grew in popularity until he died on 24 January 1939 in Zürich.

== Nutrition ==
At his sanatorium in Zürich, a balanced diet of raw vegetables and fruit was used as a means to heal patients, contrary to the beliefs commonly held at the end of the 19th century. Bircher-Benner believed raw foods were more nutritious because they contain direct energy from the sun. He encouraged people of good health to eat approximately 50% raw foods on a daily basis, and for those with poor health to eat 100% raw foods. Bircher-Benner's sisters, Alice Bircher and Berta Brupbacher-Bircher, created many recipes using raw foods to help a diet of raw foods seem more appealing. Because of this help from his sisters, his sanatorium gained enormous popularity and he expanded the size of his clinic.

Bircher-Benner postulated eating fruit, vegetables and nuts instead of meat. He also advocated a spartan physical regime. At his Zürich sanatorium off Bircher-Benner-Platz, the patients had to follow a somewhat monastic daily schedule including early bedtime (21:00), physical training and active gardening work. Each meal began with a small dish of muesli, developed by Bircher-Benner, followed by mostly raw vegetables and a dessert. Patients were not allowed to consume alcohol, coffee, chocolate or tobacco while they were being treated. Bircher-Benner also recommended his patients to sunbathe, take cold showers and use a medicinal bath developed by American physician John Harvey Kellogg. His theory of life was based on harmony between people and nature, a key component of a German lifestyle reform movement, and the reason he named his clinic "Vital Force."

== Criticism ==
Bircher-Benner held pseudoscientific ideas about nutrition, including vitalism. He believed that all people including babies should eat only raw food. Bircher-Benner developed the idea that cooking deprived foods of their nutritional content and destroyed their "vital substance". He believed that cooked foods leave decay in the digestive tract, that may cause autointoxication.

Bircher-Benner's work was not recognized by other scientists until the discovery of vitamins in fruits and vegetables in the 1930s. Because his ideas about nutrition were not supported by the science of his day, he was dismissed as a quack by the medical profession. A contemporaneous academic review of Bircher-Benner's cookbook Health-Giving Dishes claims that the work contains "a mixture of physiological half-truths and fantasies" and concludes that the number of people capable of eating solely raw fruits and vegetables as Bircher-Benner encouraged is limited because only few humans can live as herbivores. Thomas Mann, a well-known novelist, visited the sanatorium and described it as a "health jail."

Despite disapproval from others, Bircher-Benner's ideas caught the public's eye and his sanatorium stayed in business until some time after his death.

== Legacy ==
Shortly after his death, a second sanatorium was opened and named "People's Sanatorium for a Lifestyle Based on Nature," and was run according to Bircher-Benner's ideas. In 1939, the Vital Force clinic was renamed the "Bircher-Benner Clinic" in his memory. In the late 20th century, after closure of the sanatorium, it was briefly a student hostel. It has since been purchased by Zürich Financial Services, and is named the Zürich Development Center. It is used for executive training, and also houses an extensive private art collection.

Several brands of factory-made cereals based on Bircher-Benner's original recipe for wholegrain-fruit-and-nut muesli are widely marketed as popular breakfast and snack foods in Europe and North America.

== Selected publications ==
- Food Science For All (translated by Arnold Eiloart, 1928)
- Fruit Dishes and Raw Vegetables: Sunlight (Vitamine) Food (1930)
- Health-Giving Dishes (1934)
- The Essential Nature and Organisation of Food Energy (translated by D. E. Hecht and E. F. Meyer, 1939)
- Hijos sanos y robustos (traducion del Dr. Emilio R, Meier, 1956)
- The Prevention of Incurable Disease (translated by E. F. Meyer, 1959)

== See also ==
- Raw foodism
