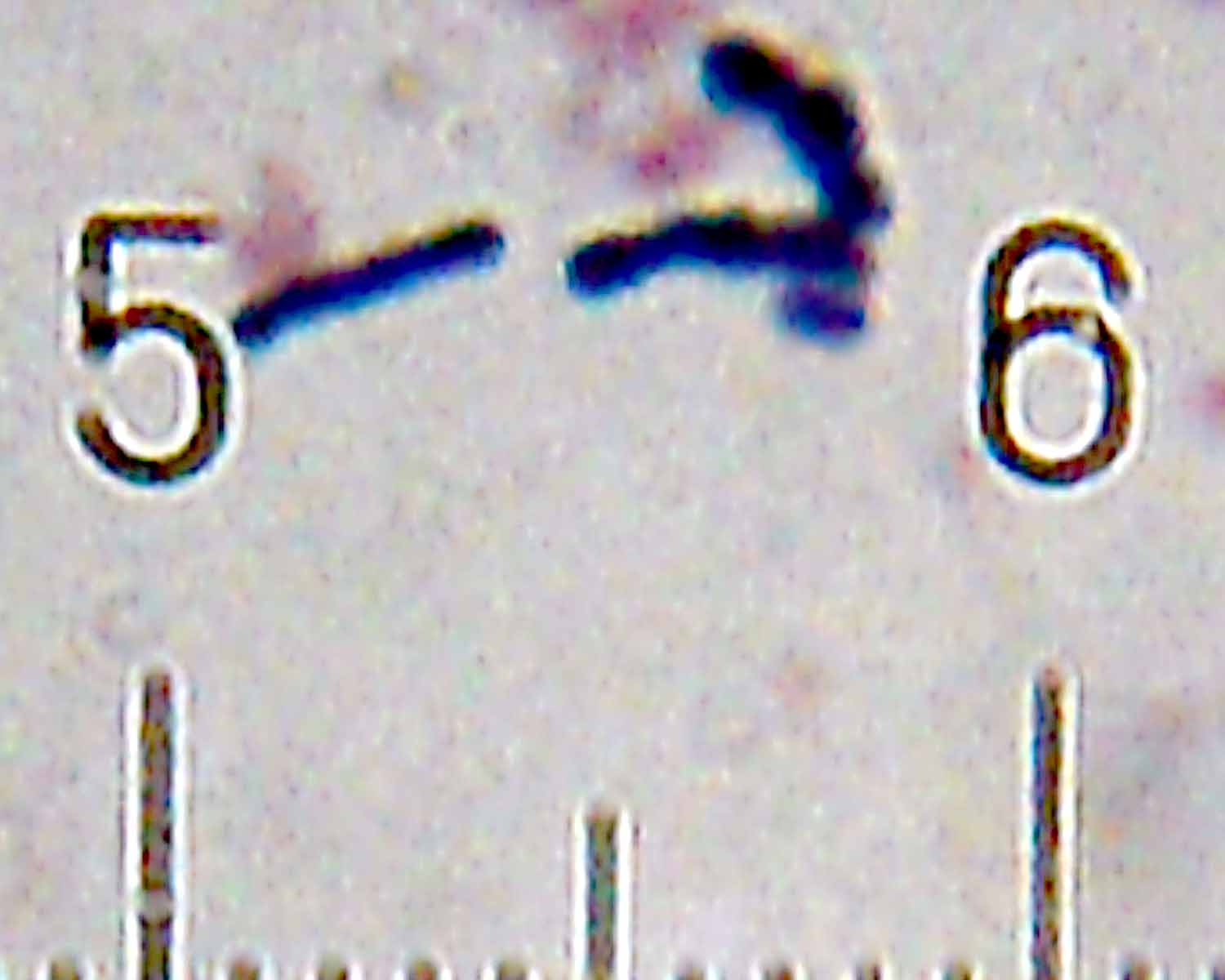

Scientific classification
- Domain: Bacteria
- Kingdom: Bacillati
- Phylum: Actinomycetota
- Class: Actinomycetes
- Order: Bifidobacteriales
- Family: Bifidobacteriaceae
- Genus: Bifidobacterium
- Species: B. animalis

Binomial name
- Bifidobacterium animalis (Mitsuoka 1969) Scardovi and Trovatelli 1974 (Approved Lists 1980)

Subspecies
- B. a. animalis B. a. lactis

= Bifidobacterium animalis =

Species of bacterium

Bifidobacterium animalis is a gram-positive, anaerobic, rod-shaped bacterium of the Bifidobacterium genus which can be found in the large intestines of most mammals, including humans.

Bifidobacterium animalis and Bifidobacterium lactis were previously described as two distinct species. Presently, both are considered B. animalis with the subspecies Bifidobacterium animalis subsp. animalis and Bifidobacterium animalis subsp. lactis.

Both old names B. animalis and B. lactis are still used on product labels, as this species is frequently used as a probiotic. In most cases, which subspecies is used in the product is not clear.

== Trade names ==
Several companies have attempted to trademark particular strains, and as a marketing technique, have invented scientific-sounding names for the strains.

Danone (Dannon in the United States) markets the subspecies strain DN 173 010 as Bifidus Digestivum (UK), Bifidus Regularis (US and Mexico), Bifidobacterium Lactis or B.L. Regularis (Canada), DanRegularis (Brazil), Bifidus Actiregularis (Argentina, Austria, Belgium, Bulgaria, Chile, Czech Republic, France, Germany, Greece, Hungary, Israel, Italy, Kazakhstan, Netherlands, Portugal, Romania, Russia, South Africa, Spain and the UK), and Bifidus Essensis in the Middle East (and formerly in Hungary, Bulgaria, Romania and The Netherlands) through Activia from Safi Danone KSA.

Chr. Hansen A/S from Denmark has a similar claim on a strain of Bifidobacterium animalis subsp. lactis, marketed under the trademark BB-12.

Lidl lists "Bifidobacterium BB-12" in its "Proviact" yogurt.

Bifidobacterium lactis Bl-04 and Bi-07 are strains from DuPont's Danisco FloraFIT range. They are used in many dietary probiotic supplements.

Theralac contains the strains Bifidobacterium lactis BI-07 and Bifidobacterium lactis BL-34 (also called BI-04) in its probiotic capsule.

Bifidobacterium animalis lactis HN019 (DR10) is a strain from Fonterra licensed to DuPont, which markets it as HOWARU Bifido. It is sold in a variety of commercial probiotics, among them Tropicana Products Essentials Probiotics, Attune Wellness Bars and NOW Foods Clinical GI Probiotic. Fonterra has a yogurt that is sold in New Zealand called Symbio Probalance, where the strain is labelled as DR10.

== Research ==
Bifidobacterium animalis subspecies lactis BB-12 administered in combination with other probiotics has shown "a trend toward increased remission" in a study of 32 patients with ulcerative colitis.

Research on Bifidobacterium animalis supplementation in preterm infants, as detailed in the systematic review by Szajewska et al., a meta-analysis of four randomized controlled trials (RCTs) involving a total of 324 infants, has shown promising results. These include increased fecal bifidobacteria counts, reduced Enterobacteriaceae and Clostridium spp counts, as well as improvements in stool pH, fecal calprotectin concentrations, fecal immunoglobulin A levels, and short-chain fatty acid concentrations. However, the analysis did not find significant effects on the risk of necrotizing enterocolitis stage ≥2, risk of sepsis, or use of antibiotics compared to controls.

== Products ==
B. animalis is present in many food products and dietary supplements. The probiotic is mostly found in dairy products. Bifidobacterium animalis subsp. lactis BB-12 is a bacterial subspecies within the animalis strain that exhibits rod-shaped structure and lacks catalase activity. The subspecies was initially identified as Bifidobacterium bifidum, however advancements in molecular classification later reclassified it as Bifidobacterium animalis, and subsequently as Bifidobacterium animalis subsp. lactis. It was first preserved in Chr. Hansen's cell culture bank in 1983 as part of the dairy culture collection. It exhibits suitability for producing probiotic dairy products and has found application in infant formula, dietary supplements, and fermented milk products. This is due to a variety of favorable technological characteristics such as its fermentation activity, high tolerance to air, stability, and resilience to acidic and bile environments, even in freeze-dried products. Moreover, Bifidobacterium animalis subsp. lactisBB-12 does not alter the taste, appearance, or texture of food products and maintains viability in probiotic foods until consumption.

== Health concerns ==
The manipulation of the gut flora is complex and may cause bacteria-host interactions. Although probiotics, in general, are considered safe, there are concerns about their use in certain cases. Some people, such as those with compromised immune systems, short bowel syndrome, central venous catheters, heart valve disease and premature infants, may be at higher risk for adverse events. Rarely, consumption of probiotics may cause bacteremia, and sepsis, potentially fatal infections in children with lowered immune systems or who are already critically ill.
