= Café complet =

Traditional Swiss dinner

The café complet (French for complete coffee) is a traditional Swiss dinner that consists of milk coffee that is served together with bread, butter, jam, honey and cheese.

It originates in the 1870s, as hotels in central and western Switzerland as well as the ones in the Bernese Oberland wanted to offer a simple refreshment to tourists. Hoteliers gave it a French name, as it represented modernism during this era.

The café complet reached its highest popularity after the Second World War, as more women had to do work outside of the home, and were not inclined to cook an evening meal upon returning.

== Literature ==
- Flammer, Dominik; Müller, Sylvain (2022). Das kulinarische Erbe der Alpen [The culinary heritage of the Alps] (in German) (3 ed.). AT Verlag. ISBN 978-3-03800-735-7.
