= Norrmejerier =

Swedish dairy company

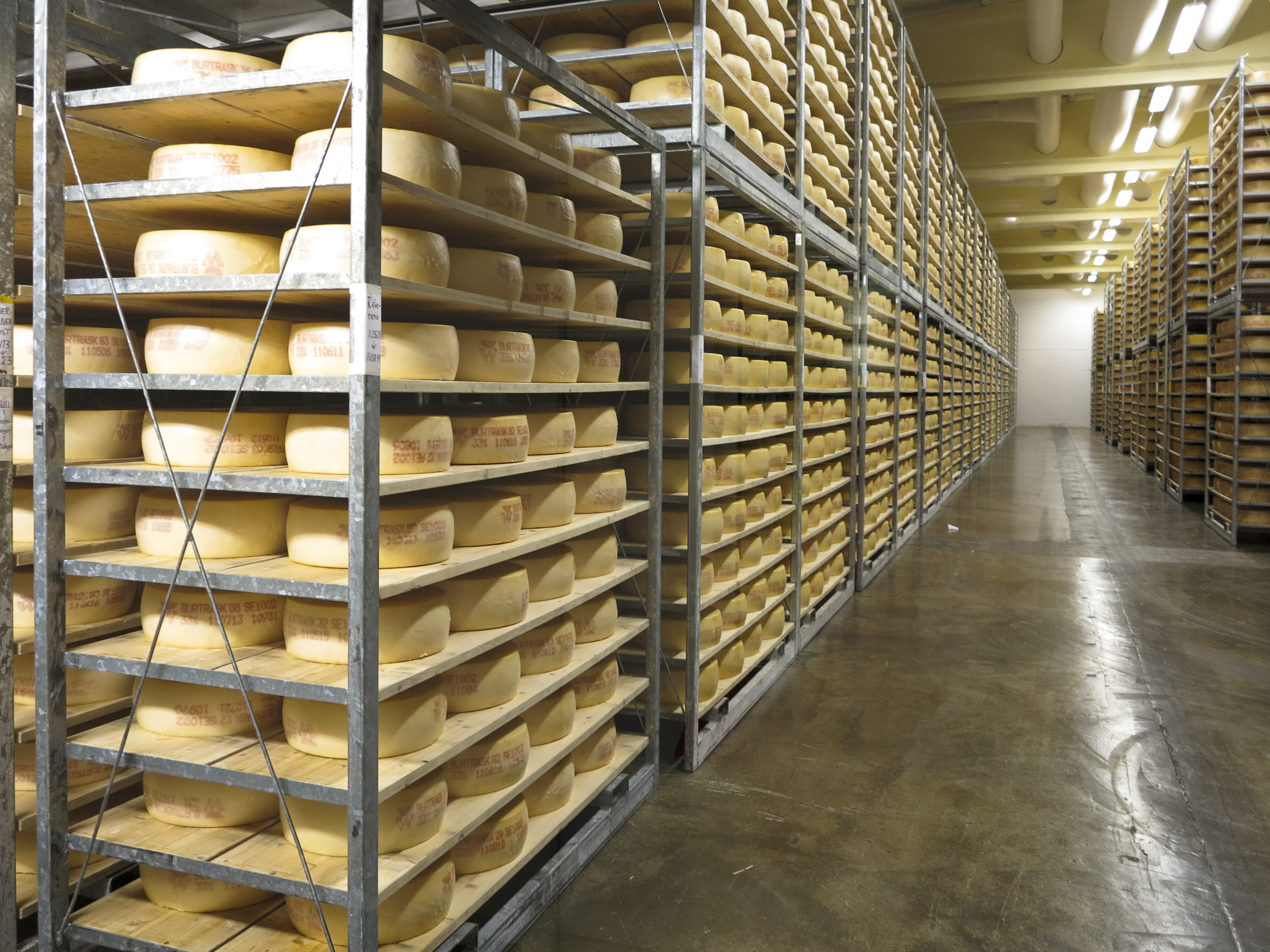
- Stock of Västerbotten Cheese in Ånäset, Sweden.
- Industry: Dairy
- Founded: 1971
- Headquarters: Umeå, Sweden
- Revenue: SEK 1.5 billion (2005)
- Number of employees: 490 (2005)
- Website: www.norrmejerier.se

Norrmejerier is a Swedish dairy company. Norrmejerier was formed in 1971 when the Västerbottens Södra Mejeriförening, Skellefteortens mejeriförening and Lappmarkens mejeriförening were combined. Norrbottens läns producentförening was incorporated in 1992. Norrmejerier is the sole producer of Västerbotten cheese.
