= Svecia =

Swedish semi-hard cow's-milk cheese

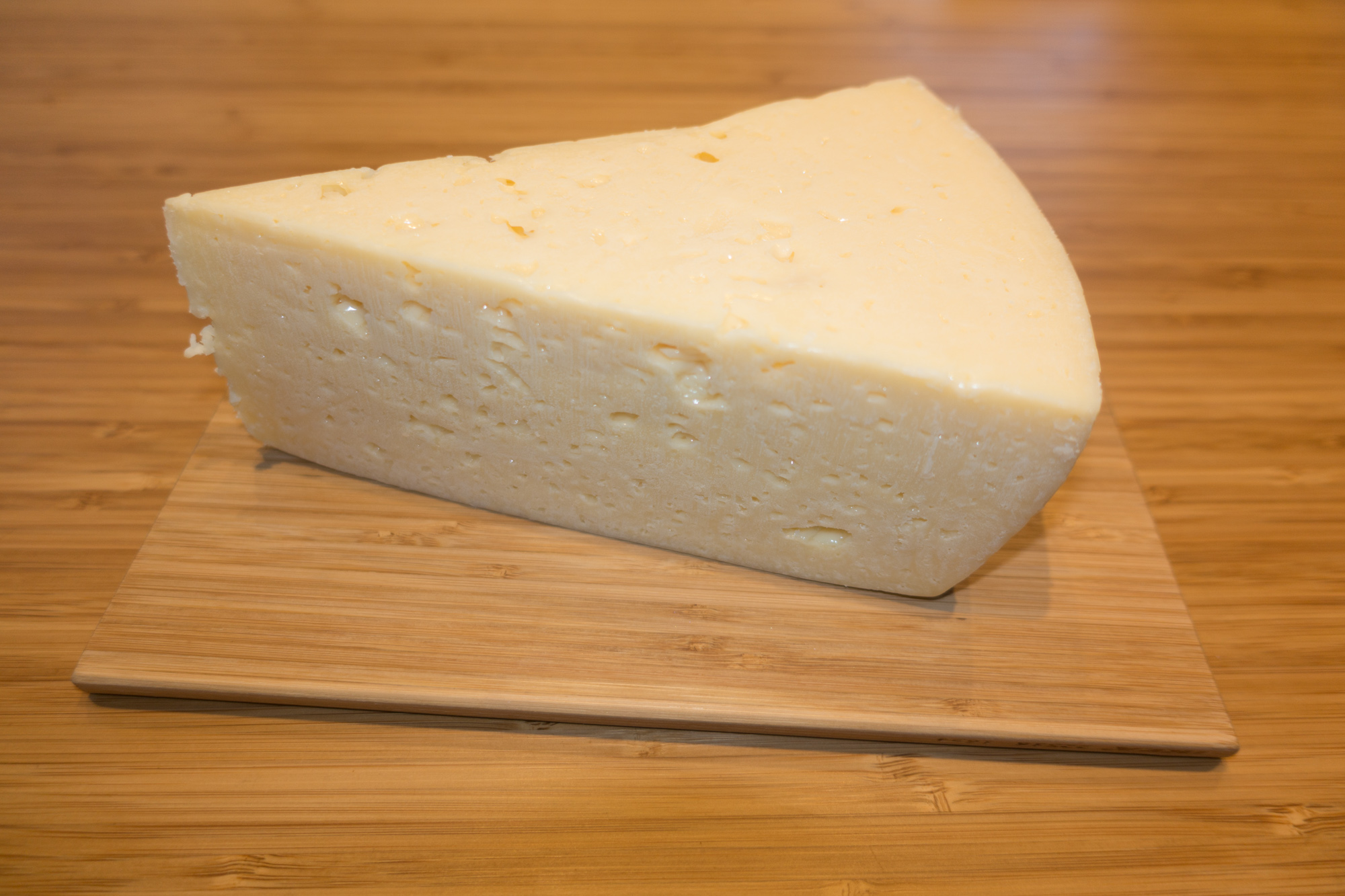
- Country of origin: Sweden
- Region: Kalmar Municipality
- Source of milk: Cows
- Pasteurised: Yes
- Texture: semi-hard
- Fat content: 28%
- Dimensions: cylindrical form with a diameter of 35 centimetres
- Weight: 12-15kg
- Aging time: 2-14 months
- Certification: PGI

Svecia (or Sveciaost, ost meaning cheese) is a Swedish cheese. It is a semi-hard cow's-milk cheese, with a creamy consistency, light yellow colour, small irregular holes, and a mildly acidic taste. It is produced in wax-covered cylinders weighing 12 to 15 kg (26 to 33 lb) each.

The cheese is similar to other Swedish hard cheeses whose manufacturing methods date back to perhaps the 13th century, but the name Svecia — from the Latin Suecia meaning "Sweden" — is a 20th-century invention, dating to 1920.

Svecia is produced in a fashion typical to many semi-hard cheeses. Milk is pasteurized to 72 °C (162 °F) then cooled to around 30 °C (86 °F). Rennet is added to coagulate the milk into curds and lactic acid enzymes are added to replace enzymes and bacteria killed during pasteurization. The curd is cut, stirred, and slowly drained, then heated back up to a temperature near 40 °C (104 °F) to drive off more moisture. After salt is added, the curds are packed into moulds, loosely enough to leave the air pockets which make up Svecia's tiny holes. After a soak in brine, bringing the total salt content of the cheese to 1.0–1.5 percent by weight, the cheese is aged in a dry environment for at least two months — sometimes up to more than a year.
