= Skånemejerier =

Swedish dairy company

Skånemejerier, based in Skåne County, is a Swedish cooperative and Sweden's largest producers of dairy products after Arla Foods. Founded in 1964, the company's products include milk, cream, yoghurt, soured milk, soured cream, cheese, and crème fraiche. Skånemejerier is a subsidiary of the multinational dairy products corporation Lactalis since 2012.
