= Bifidobacterium animalis lactis =

Scientific classification
- Domain: Bacteria
- Kingdom: Bacillati
- Phylum: Actinomycetota
- Class: Actinomycetes
- Order: Bifidobacteriales
- Family: Bifidobacteriaceae
- Genus: Bifidobacterium
- Species: B. animalis
- Subspecies: B. a. subsp. lactis

Trinomial name
- Bifidobacterium animalis subsp. lactis (Meile et al., 1997) Masco et al., 2004

Synonyms
- Bifidobacterium lactis Meile et al., 1997

Subspecies of probiotic bacterium

Bifidobacterium animalis subsp. lactis is a subspecies of the bacterium Bifidobacterium animalis. It is a lactic acid bacterium that lives within the mammalian colon and can be transmitted between animals. Bifidobacterium animalis subspecies lactis was initially named Bifidobacterium lactis when it was first isolated from fermented milk in 1997.

== Biology and ecology ==
Bifidobacterium animalis ssp. lactis is a gram-positive, rod-shaped bacterium. It is non-motile and unable to form spores. Bifidobacterium animalis ssp. lactis lives within the guts of healthy adults and infants and is therefore part of the gut microbiome. This bacterium shows resistance towards the harsh conditions within the gastrointestinal tract, which could be due to the production of exopolysaccharides.

== Health benefits ==
Bifidobacterium animalis ssp. lactis is commonly used as a probiotic and is added to dairy products such as yogurt, buttermilk, cottage cheese and other cheeses. It grows well in milk which makes it suitable for addition to dairy products. Also, it is resistant to acid and has a high oxygen tolerance, which allows the bacterium to survive after consumption whilst travelling through the gastrointestinal tract.

Using Bifidobacterium animalis ssp. lactis as a probiotic can bring multiple health benefits. For example, the strain HN019 can be used to treat constipation by increasing how often bowel movements occur. The strain UABla-12 decreases symptom severity and abdominal pain of adults with irritable bowel syndrome (IBS) symptoms. Similarly, the strain Bi-07 decreases bloating in patients with the following functional bowel disorders: non-constipation-IBS, functional diarrhoea and functional bloating.

The strain HN019 can also strengthen the immune system by increasing the amounts of total, helper (CD4^{+}) and activated (CD25^{+}) T lymphocytes and natural killer cells. These are involved in the response to pathogens, therefore this bacterium can help to clear infections more quickly. Also, the strain 420 can be used for weight loss as it decreases abdominal fat, therefore decreasing waist circumference, and also causes reduces appetite.

When Bifidobacterium animalis ssp. lactis is used as a probiotic, it can also alter the microbiota within various areas of the body. The strain A6 can lead to an increased amount of butyrate produced by intestinal bacteria such as Clostridium, Eubacterium, Roseburia and Butyrivibrio. This can increase the amount of butyrate present in the serum, muscles and bones, therefore combating bone and muscle loss. Furthermore, the administration of Bifidobacterium animalis ssp. lactis Bl-04 with Lactobacillus acidophilus NCFM can alter the characteristic tumour microbiota of patients with colorectal cancer. The tumour microbiota includes an increased diversity of microbes and increased amounts of taxa such as Fusobacterium, Selenomonas and Peptostreptococcus. The consumption of these probiotics increases an abundance butyrate-producing bacteria, such as Faecalibacterium and Clostridiales species.

== Antibiotic resistance ==
The bacterial strains used as probiotics cannot have antibiotic resistance genes that could be transferred to other bacteria, such as through horizontal gene transfer, as these genes could be transferred to pathogens within the body. Therefore, if these pathogens were targeted using antibiotics that they are resistant to, the pathogens would survive. Many strains of Bifidobacterium animalis subspecies lactis are resistant to the antibiotic tetracycline, and this is caused by possession of the tet(W) gene. There is no evidence of this gene being transferred between bacteria, even after attempts to force translocation of the tet(W) gene through conjugation, therefore Bifidobacterium animalis subspecies lactis is safe for use as a probiotic.

== Enzyme activity ==
For Bifidobacterium animalis subspecies lactis cell extracts, aminopeptidase activities increase and α- and β-galactosidase activities increased by 100x when the cells are grown in milk compared to in de Man, Rogosa and Sharpe (MRS) broth. Cell extracts are able to fully hydrolyse casein fractions, with α-casein being hydrolysed slower than β- and κ-caseins.

Bifidobacterium animalis subspecies lactis possesses an intracellular endopeptidase as a monomeric enzyme. This is endopeptidase O (PepO), and is effective against substrates with a minimum of 5 amino acid residues, like met-enkephalin, and can also hydrolyse larger substrates, like αs1-casein(f1-23). However, this endopeptidase is unable to hydrolyse glycomacropeptide, which has a length of 64 amino acids.
