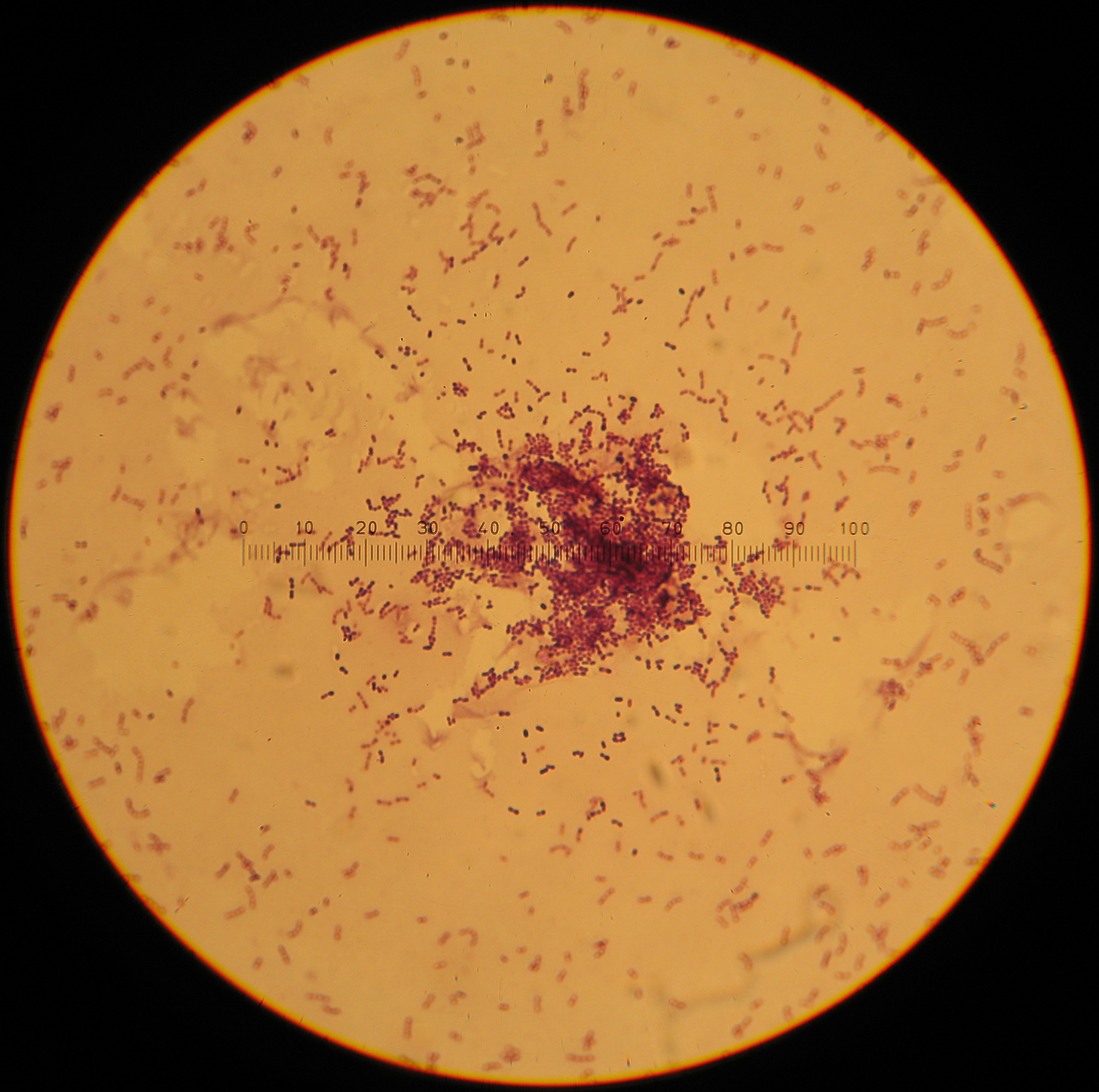

Scientific classification
- Domain: Bacteria
- Kingdom: Bacillati
- Phylum: Bacillota
- Class: Bacilli
- Order: Lactobacillales
- Family: Streptococcaceae
- Genus: Lactococcus
- Species: L. lactis

Binomial name
- Lactococcus lactis (Lister 1873); Schleifer et al. 1986

Subspecies
- L. l. cremoris L. l. hordniae L. l. lactis L. l. lactis bv. diacetylactis L. l. tructae

= Lactococcus lactis =

Species of bacterium

Lactococcus lactis is a gram-positive bacterium used extensively in the production of buttermilk and cheese, but has also become famous as the first genetically modified organism to be used alive for the treatment of human disease. L. lactis cells are cocci that group in pairs and short chains, and, depending on growth conditions, appear ovoid with a typical length of 0.5 - 1.5 μm. L. lactis does not produce spores (nonsporulating) and are not motile (nonmotile). They have a homofermentative metabolism, meaning they produce lactic acid from sugars. They've also been reported to produce exclusive L-(+)-lactic acid. However, reported D-(−)-lactic acid can be produced when cultured at low pH. The capability to produce lactic acid is one of the reasons why L. lactis is one of the most important microorganisms in the dairy industry. Based on its history in food fermentation, L. lactis has generally recognized as safe (GRAS) status, with few case reports of it being an opportunistic pathogen.

Lactococcus lactis is of crucial importance for manufacturing dairy products, such as buttermilk and cheeses. When L. lactis ssp. lactis is added to milk, the bacterium uses enzymes to produce energy molecules (ATP), from lactose. The byproduct of ATP energy production is lactic acid. The lactic acid produced by the bacterium curdles the milk, which then separates to form curds that are used to produce cheese. Other uses that have been reported for this bacterium include the production of pickled vegetables, beer or wine, some breads, and other fermented foodstuffs like soymilk kefir, buttermilk, and others. L. lactis is one of the best characterized low GC Gram positive bacteria with detailed knowledge on genetics, metabolism and biodiversity.

L. lactis is mainly isolated from either the dairy environment, or plant material. Dairy isolates are suggested to have evolved from plant isolates through a process in which genes without benefit in the rich milk were lost or downregulated. This process, called genome erosion or reductive evolution, has been described in several other lactic acid bacteria. The proposed transition from the plant to the dairy environment was reproduced in the laboratory through experimental evolution of a plant isolate that was cultivated in milk for a prolonged period. Consistent with the results from comparative genomics (see references above), this resulted in L. lactis losing or downregulating genes that are dispensable in milk and the upregulation of peptide transport.

Hundreds of novel small RNAs were identified by Meulen et al. in the genome of L. lactis MG1363. One of them, LLnc147, was shown to be involved in carbon uptake and metabolism.

== Cheese production ==
L. lactis subsp. lactis (formerly Streptococcus lactis) is used in the early stages for the production of many cheeses, including brie, camembert, Cheddar, Colby, Gruyère, Parmesan, and Roquefort. The use of L. lactis in dairy factories is not without issues. Bacteriophages specific to L. lactis cause significant economic losses each year by preventing the bacteria from fully metabolizing the milk substrate. Several epidemiologic studies showed the phages mainly responsible for these losses are from the species 936, c2, and P335 (all from the family Siphoviridae).

The state Assembly of Wisconsin, also the number one cheese-producing state in the United States, voted in 2010 to name this bacterium as the official state microbe; it would have been the first and only such designation by a state legislature in the nation, however the legislation was not adopted by the Senate. The legislation was introduced in November 2009 as Assembly Bill 556 by Representatives Hebl, Vruwink, Williams, Pasch, Danou, and Fields; it was cosponsored by Senator Taylor. The bill passed the Assembly on May 15, 2010, and was dropped by the Senate on April 28.

== Therapeutic benefits ==
The feasibility of using lactic acid bacteria (LAB) as functional protein delivery vectors has been widely investigated. Lactococcus lactis has been demonstrated to be a promising candidate for the delivery of functional proteins because of its noninvasive and nonpathogenic characteristics. Many different expression systems of L. lactis have been developed and used for heterologous protein expression.

=== Lactose fermentation ===
In one study that sought to prove that some fermentation produced by L. lactis can hinder motility in pathogenic bacteria, the motilities of Pseudomonas, Vibrio, and Leptospira strains were severely disrupted by lactose utilization on the part of L. lactis. Using flagellar Salmonella as the experimental group, the research team found that a product of lactose fermentation is the cause of motility impairment in Salmonella. It is suggested that the L. lactis supernatant mainly affects Salmonella motility through disruption of flagellar rotation rather than through irreversible damage to morphology and physiology. Lactose fermentation by L. lactis produces acetate that reduces the intracellular pH of Salmonella, which in turn slows the rotation of their flagella. These results highlight the potential use of L. lactis for preventing infections by multiple bacterial species.

=== Secretion of Interleukin-10 ===
Genetically engineered L. lactis can secrete the cytokine interleukin-10 (IL-10) for the treatment of inflammatory bowel diseases (IBD), since IL-10 has a central role in downregulating inflammatory cascades and matrix metalloproteinases. A study by Lothar Steidler and Wolfgang Hans shows that in situ synthesis of IL-10 by genetically engineered L. lactis requires much lower doses than systemic treatments like antibodies to tumor necrosis factor (TNF) or recombinant IL-10.

The authors propose two possible routes by which IL-10 can reach its therapeutic target. Genetically engineered L. lactis may produce murine IL-10 in the lumen, and the protein may diffuse to responsive cells in the epithelium or the lamina propria. Another route involves L. lactis being taken up by M cells because of its bacterial size and shape, and the major part of the effect may be due to recombinant IL-10 production in situ in intestinal lymphoid tissue. Both routes may involve paracellular transport mechanisms that are enhanced in inflammation. After transport, IL-10 may directly downregulate inflammation. In principle, this method may be useful for intestinal delivery of other protein therapeutics that are unstable or difficult to produce in large quantities and an alternative to the systemic treatment of IBD.

=== Tumor-suppressor through Tumor metastasis-inhibiting peptide KISS1 ===
Another study, led by Zhang B, created a L. lactis strain that maintains a plasmid containing a tumor metastasis-inhibiting peptide known as KISS1. L. lactis NZ9000 was demonstrated to be a cell factory for the secretion of biologically active KiSS1 protein, exerting inhibition effects on human colorectal cancer HT-29 cells.

KiSS1 secreted from recombinant L. lactis strain effectively downregulated the expression of Matrix metalloproteinases (MMP-9), a crucial key in the invasion, metastasis, and regulation of the signaling pathways controlling tumor cell growth, survival, invasion, inflammation, and angiogenesis. The reason for this is that KiSS1 expressed in L. lactis activates the MAPK pathway via GPR54 signaling, suppressing NFκB binding to the MMP-9 promoter and thus downregulating MMP-9 expression. This, in turn, reduces the survival rate, inhibits metastasis, and induces dormancy of cancer cells.

In addition, it was demonstrated that tumor growth can be inhibited by the LAB strain itself, due to the ability of LAB to produce exopolysaccharides. This study shows that L. lactis NZ9000 can inhibit HT-29 proliferation and induce cell apoptosis by itself. The success of this strain's construction helped to inhibit migration and expansion of cancer cells, showing that the secretion properties of L. lactis of this particular peptide may serve as a new tool for cancer therapy in the future.
