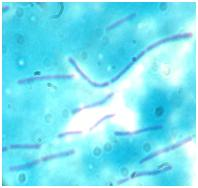

Scientific classification
- Domain: Bacteria
- Phylum: Bacillota
- Class: Bacilli
- Order: Lactobacillales
- Family: Lactobacillaceae
- Genus: Lactobacillus
- Species: L. delbrueckii
- Subspecies: L. d. bulgaricus

= Lactobacillus bulgaricus GLB44 =

Subspecies of bacterium

Lactobacillus delbrueckii subsp. bulgaricus is a bacterial subspecies traditionally isolated from European yogurts. Lactobacillus bulgaricus GLB44 differs from other L. bulgaricus strains, because it was isolated from the leaves of Galanthus nivalis (common snowdrop) in Bulgaria.

== General information ==
GLB44 is derived from the leaves of the snowdrop plants; it is the only known strain of this subspecies that has a vegan origin (not from yogurt) and it is a probiotic.

The snowdrop plant is found in European mountainous regions, and blooms between January and May, when temperatures can fall below freezing in the region. Thus, GLB44 is also naturally capable of surviving in below-freezing temperatures, allowing GLB44 to survive in plant-based aliments stored at refrigerator temperatures.

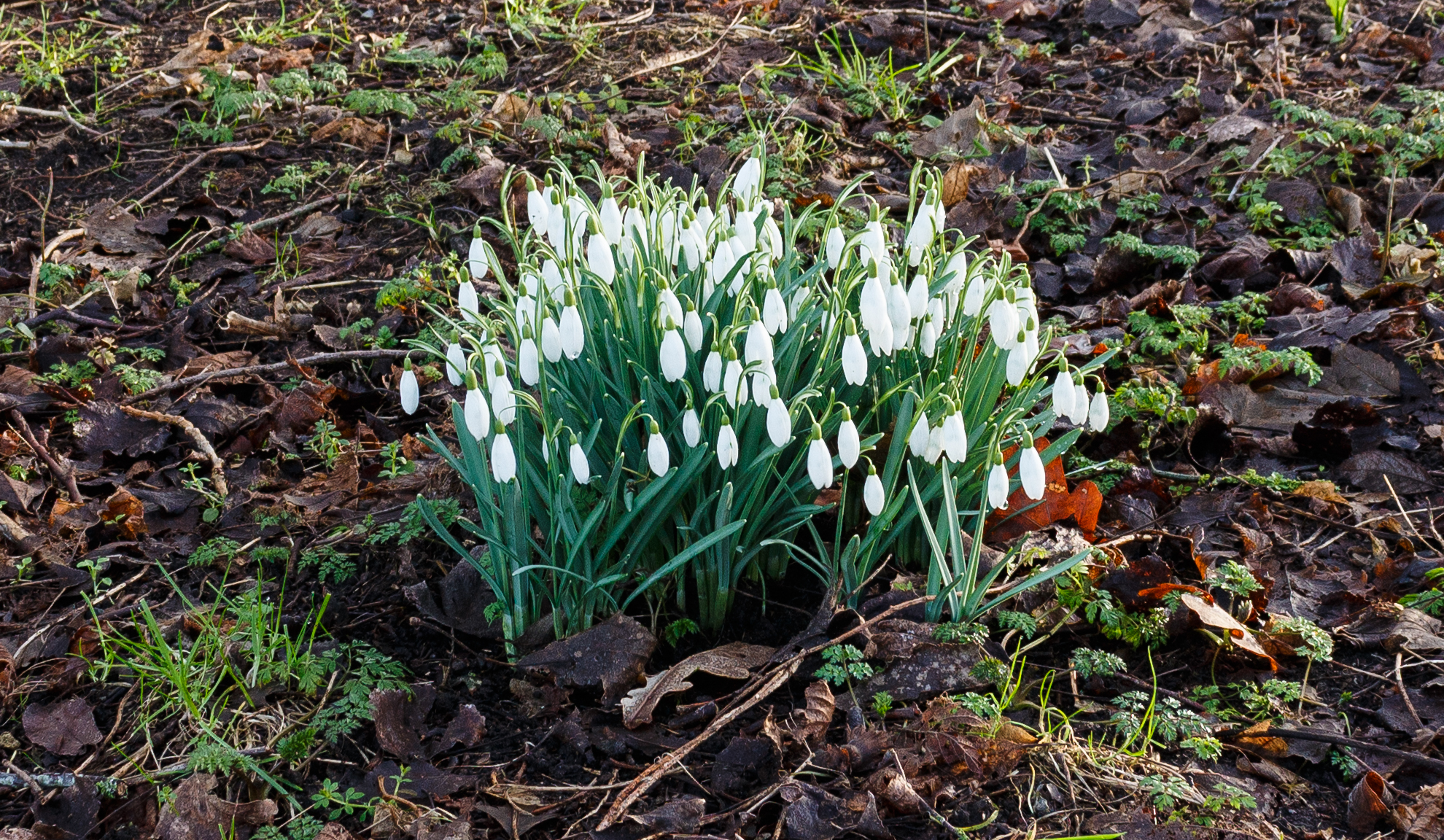
Galanthus nivalis plants

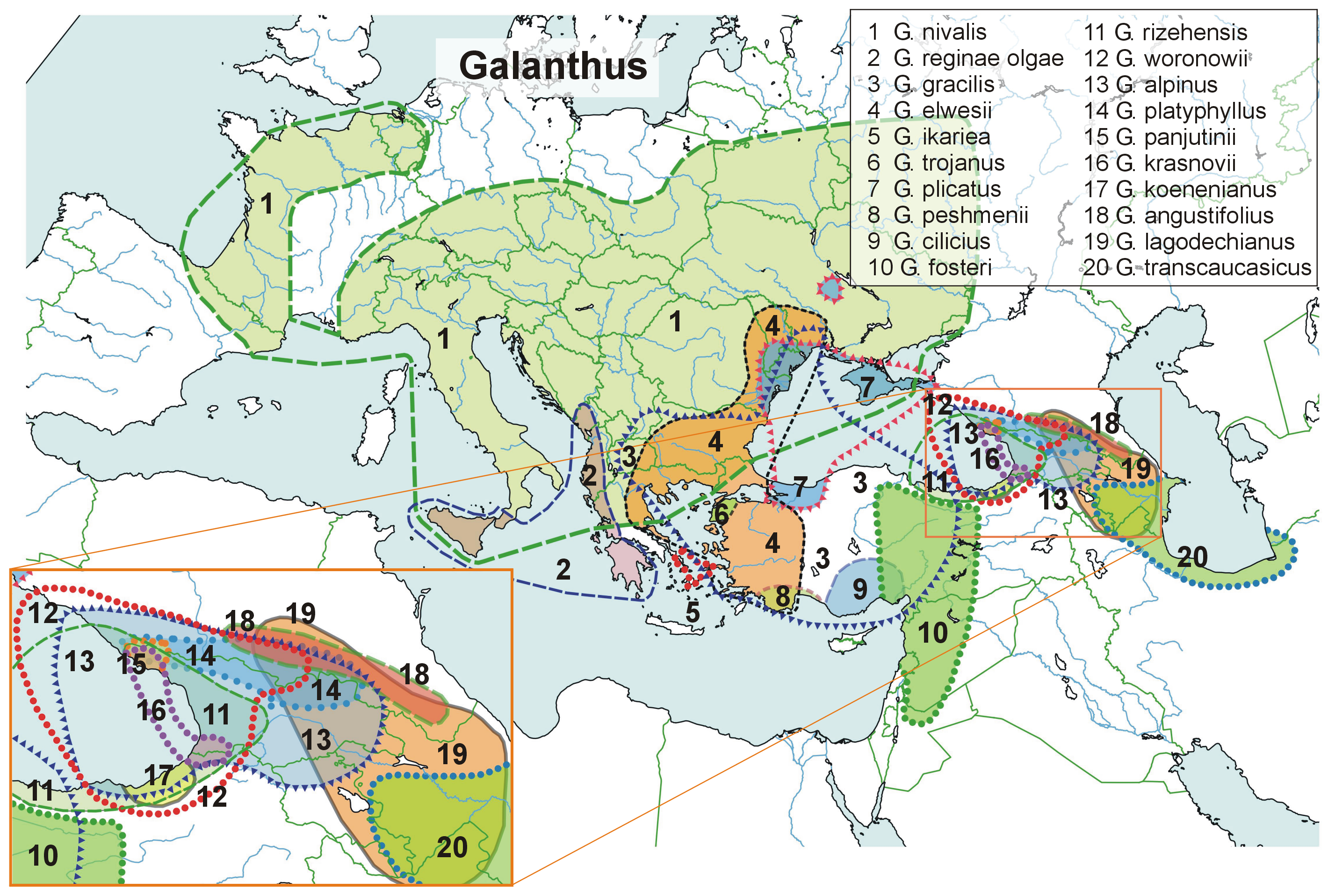
The largest area in green, numbered "1" shows the Galanthus nivalis species distribution

GLB44 differs from other probiotics such as L. plantarum 299v or L. rhamnosus GG which are originally extracted from the human mouth. Others like Bifidobacterium are extracted from the feaces of newborns, while others, such as some strains of L. brevis, come from the human vaginal canal. GLB44 does not have any interference with mammalian organs, only flowers, leaves and juices. This is important for multiple reasons such as the fact that there is some scientific evidence that probiotics growing in the human mouth naturally could accelerate tooth decay.

While many probiotics have major allergens in the growth solution, GLB44 has no major allergens as part of its growth medium. For example, the growth medium for L. plantarum 299v includes barley, which contains a small amount of gluten, and L. rhamnosus GG has a small amount of casein. The fact that GLB44 is grown in vegetable juice means GLB44 does not contain any of the seven major allergens for which the U.S. Food and Drug Administration requires additional labelling: lactose, gluten, soya, peanuts, tree nuts, fish, or crustacean shellfish.

Another major difference is the safety track record of L. bulgaricus, which is now over 109 years since it was scientifically isolated. There are certain similarities between L. bulgaricus GLB44 and some other probiotics. For example, L. bulgaricus, L. rhamnosus GG and L. plantarum 299v all have scientific records of their ability to pass successfully through the gastrointestinal tract.

== History ==
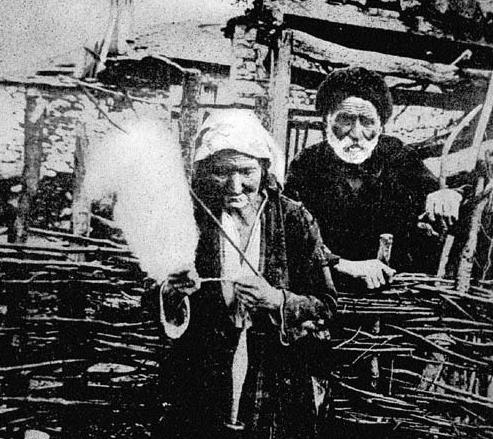
Living in a mountain village of Bulgaria with her son who was 101 years old, Vasilka's age was not unusual for her community, which, of note, consumed yogurt containing L. bulgaricus as a dietary staple.

The first L. bulgaricus was discovered more than a century ago, the result of a study into the unusual longevity of mountain villagers in Bulgaria (thus called L. bulgaricus) by Dr. Stamen Grigorov in 1905. In 1912, the New York Times wrote an overview article about the new discovery and the use of fermented yogurts with L. bulgaricus in Bulgaria titled “Metchnikoff Confirmed in His Theory of Long Life,” highlighting villager Vasilka, age 126, as the longest living person in the world. In Bulgarian communities there were 3,000 centenarians from a population of 3 million – six times higher than the number of centenarians per capita in the United States today. In the article the author described the discovery as follows: "In Bulgaria, the home of this bacillus, the majority of the natives live to age considerably in excess of what is recognized as the term of life among Western nations, an inquiry has shown that in the Eastern part of Southern Europe, among a population of about 3,000,000, there were more than 3,000 centenarians found performing duties which would not be assigned to a man of 65 years of age elsewhere. It is quite common to find among the peasants who live to such a large extent upon soured milk individuals of 110 and 120 years of age."

There is a complex interplay between the probiotic bacteria and the body's immune system in the large intestine, where bacteria stimulate the body's own immune system to inhibit the pathogenic bacteria. In a controlled study, 61 elderly volunteers, after 6 months of a daily dose of L. bulgaricus, responded to the intake of probiotic with an increase in the percentage of NK cells, an improvement in the parameters defining the immune risk profile (IRP), and an increase in the T cell subsets that are less differentiated. The probiotic group also showed decreased concentrations of the pro-inflammatory cytokine IL-8 but increased antimicrobial peptide hBD-2.

== Safety of use ==
Due to more than a century of safe use, the FDA has granted L. bulgaricus a "grandfather" status, with an automatic GRAS status (generally recognized as safe). Moreover, the Code of Federal Regulations mandates that in the US, for a product to be called yogurt, it must contain two specific strains of lactic acid bacteria: Lactobacillus bulgaricus and Streptococcus thermophilus, as regulated by the FDA.

L. bulgaricus GLB44 is a safe product, without limitations of the quantity consumed. It is also recommendable for the elderly as it helps reduce infections such as the common cold, as well as for young children (i.e., when they suffer from acute diarrhea). Harvard Women's Health Watch, published by Harvard Medical School, recommends a GLB44 dose range of between 1 and 10 billion colony forming units (CFU) per day, the amount contained in a capsule or two several days a week.

GLB44 is not a bacterium that can live naturally in the human mouth, as presented by the Human Oral Microbiome Database. A study conducted by the University of Texas uncovered that while a bacterium called S. mutans is the biggest culprit for tooth decay, various lactobacilli are also associated with the progression of lesions. GLB44 does not increase the risk of tooth decay due to its inability to live in the human mouth, an advantage versus other probiotics that contain any of the following lactobacilli that live naturally in the human mouth and could contribute to the tooth decay: L. acidophilus, L. brevis, L. casei, L. fermentum, L. gasseri, L. paracasei, L plantarum, L. reuteri, L. rhamnosus, L. salivarius.

== L. bulgaricus GLB44 and the definition of probiotics ==
The U.S. Food and Drug Administration (FDA) has presented on their website the following guideline: “Guidance for Industry on Complementary and Alternative Medicine Products and Their Regulation by the Food and Drug Administration” In this article, the definition of "Probiotics" is twofold: 1) live microbial food supplements that beneficially affect the host by improving its intestinal microbial; 2) live microorganisms which, when consumed in adequate amounts of food, confer a health benefit on the host.

Another guideline presented on the FDA website, "Guidelines for Evaluation of Probiotics in Food", has outlined more specific criteria for the definition of effective probiotic based on the following criteria:

- Resistance to gastric acidity
- Bile acid resistance
- Adherence to mucus and/or human epithelial cells and cell lines
- Antimicrobial activity against potentially pathogenic bacteria
- Ability to reduce pathogen adhesion to surfaces
- Bile salt hydrolase activity

The authors of this guideline specifically outline L. bulgaricus as an example of an effective probiotic with suitable scientific substantiation of health benefits.

Resistance to gastric acid and bile acid are scientifically presented in the following studies where L. bulgaricus successfully passes through the human intestinal tract, maintaining its viability: “Survival of Yogurt Bacteria in the Human Gut” and “Lactobacillus delbrueckii subsp. bulgaricus Collection to select a strain able to survive to the human intestinal tract.”. Adherence to mucus and human epithelial cells and cell lines and the ability to reduce pathogen adhesion to surfaces is scientifically proven by the research "Influence of Gastrointestinal System Conditions on Adhesion of exopolysaccharide-producing Lactobacillus delbrueckii subsp. bulgaricus strains to Caco-2 Cells"

There are also numerous studies that outline the antimicrobial activity of L. bulgaricus against potentially pathogenic bacteria such as E. Coli, Salmonella sp., S. aureus, V. cholera, B. subtilis, C. difficile and others.
