= Vaginal seeding =

Medical procedure

The Human Microbiome Project (HMP), completed in 2012, laid the foundation for further investigation into the role the microbiome plays in overall health and disease. One area of interest is the role which delivery mode plays in the development of the infant/neonate microbiome and what potential implications this may have long term. It has been found that infants born via vaginal delivery have microbiomes closely mirroring that of the mother's vaginal microbiome, whereas those born via cesarean section tend to resemble that of the mother's skin. One notable study from 2010 illustrated an abundance of Lactobacillus and other typical vaginal genera in stool samples of infants born via vaginal delivery and an abundance of Staphylococcus and Corynebacterium, commonly found on the skin surfaces, in stool samples of infants born via cesarean section.

From these discoveries came the concept of vaginal seeding, also known as microbirthing, which is a procedure whereby vaginal fluids (and hence vaginal microbes) are applied to a new-born child delivered by caesarean section. The idea of vaginal seeding was explored in 2015 after Maria Gloria Dominguez-Bello discovered that birth by caesarean section significantly altered the newborn child's microbiome compared to that of vaginal birth. The purpose of the technique is to recreate the natural transfer of bacteria that the baby gets during a vaginal birth. It involves placing swabs in the mother's vagina, and then wiping them onto the baby's face, mouth, eyes and skin. Due to the long-drawn nature of studying the impact of vaginal seeding, there are a limited number of studies available that support or refute its use. The evidence suggests that applying microbes from the mother's vaginal canal to the baby after cesarean section may aid in the partial restoration of the infant's natural gut microbiome with an increased likelihood of pathogenic infection to the child via vertical transmission.

== History ==
Theodor Rosebury began his study of the human microbiota in 1928. More than thirty years later, he published Microorganisms Indigenous to Man. In this book, he discussed the importance of microbial colonization after birth and its role in forming the infant microbiome. In 2015, Rosebery's perspective of microbial colonization after birth was further elucidated by a group of researchers in the United States. Studies performed by Maria Gloria Dominguez-Bello and her team indicated that the microbiome of a child born by cesarean section was significantly different from that of a child delivered by vaginal birth.

It has been found that infants born via cesarean section lack Bacteroides species until 6-18. A study published in 2020 found no significant difference in Bacteroides species colonization in women who had pre-labor and post-labor Caesarian sections, indicating that vaginal exposure may not be the sole driving force of the difference.

== Understanding the vaginal microbiome ==
The vaginal microbiome is thought to be influential in the development of the neonatal microbiome. Early studies into the vaginal microbiome revealed a predominance of Lactobacillus species. Similarly, a 2021 study evaluating impacts of the maternal vaginal microbiome composition on the development of the infant gut microbiome in early life found that the vaginal microbiome of the pregnant participants was dominated by one of several species of Lactobacillus, with four species appearing most common.

Around 1914 the association between anaerobic cocci and abnormal vaginal discharge was first established. Later, in 1955, Gardnerella vaginalis was identified as a causative agent for bacterial vaginosis (BV). This was further complicated in the 1990s when several other species were discovered from anaerobic cultures from individuals with symptoms corresponding to BV. One commonality remained throughout those experiencing symptoms of BV; The depletion of lactic acid producing bacterial species. The presence of BV has been subsequently linked to preterm birth as well as increased risk for development of sexually transmitted disease which is thought to be linked to the deficiency of Lactobacillus species, as they produce lactic acid and H_{2}O_{2} which is thought to have protective properties against some pathogenic bacteria/viruses.

Another component of the vaginal microbiome comes with its stability and variability over time. A 2012 study published in Science Translational Medicine investigated the temporal dynamics of the vaginal microbiota and found that the stability of the vaginal microbiome over time was highly individual. Some of the participants tended to exhibit higher variability over the course of the 16 weeks study with up to three alterations in their vaginal microbiome during that time. In contrast, others exhibited almost complete stability throughout the course of the study.

Fluctuations in the vaginal microbiome have been demonstrated with the menstrual cycle and intercourse. Fluctuations brought on during pregnancy have also been an area of interest as nearly all organ systems change during pregnancy to promote and maintain the pregnancy. It is known that pregnancy results in thickening of the vaginal mucosa and an increase in cervical secretions which in turn leads to smooth muscle cell hypertrophy and relaxation of the connective tissue. In addition, vaginal epithelium also exhibits hypertrophy which subsequently leads to crowding of the epithelial cells which themselves are rich in glycogen. Throughout the duration of gestation, the rising estrogen leads to additional increases in glycogen which is then metabolized into lactic acid which causes the vagina to become more acidic. This in turn causes an increase in Lactobacillus growth in the vagina. A 2009 study of longitudinal analysis of the vaginal microflora in pregnancy found that 56.5% of participants who initially had lactobacilli-diminished vaginal microbiomes during the first trimester of pregnancy developed a prevalence of the lactobacilli later in pregnancy, hinting towards the importance this genus may play in a neonate.

== Purpose ==
In the early life of animals, as well as humans, the development of the immune system and metabolism is influenced by the infant's microbiota, and alteration, dysbiosis, in the microbiota can either prevent or cause disease. The method of birth, whether vaginal or caesarean section, determines the exposure and colonization of the infant's gut microbiota. The purpose behind the practice of vaginal seeding or micro birthing is that it allows an infant delivered via caesarean section to come in contact with microbes from the birth canal. Infants delivered vaginally are exposed to beneficial microorganisms known as microbiota when they travel down the birth canal. Infants are exposed to critical bacteria via vaginal birth, such as Lactobacillus, Prevotella, Bacteroides, Escherichia/Shigella, and Bifidobacterium. Bifidobacterium is a key bacteria in the nourishment of the infants, development of immunity, and maturation of the intestinal tissue. The expectation is that this may boost their gut bacteria and lessen the danger of health issues normally associated with caesarian infants. It contributes to the seeding of the infant's gut.

The baby is exposed to the mother's vaginal microbes that wash over the child in the birth canal, which coves the skin, and enters the baby's eyes, ears, nose, and mouth. These microbes often travel down into the gut after being swallowed. It is said that these microbes are important in the postnatal development of the immune system of the baby.

In the event that a C-section is done before labour starts or before a woman's water breaks, the infant will not come into contact with maternal vaginal fluid or bacteria. Instead, they come in contact with skin microbes, such as Staphylococcus, Streptococcus, Veillonella, and Corynebacterium. a very different set of species. These differences, in turn, have been associated with increased risks of asthma, allergies, obesity, and immune deficiencies. Thus, these differences appear more often in infants after a caesarean delivery than after a vaginal delivery, according to certain epidemiological data. In fact, in the United States, studies have found that 64-82% of neonatal cases of methicillin-resistant Staphylococcus aureus infections of the skin were found to occur in those born via C-section.

== Evidence ==
Evidence suggests that cesarean delivery can increase the risk for inflammatory and metabolic diseases in infants. It is unclear whether vaginal seeding has long-term benefits or whether it is safe. In 2016 a small study of 18 infants was published in the Journal Nature Medicine to look into the benefits of vaginal seeding. The microbiome of the four cesarean delivered infants receiving the microbial transfer was found to have a similar microbiome to the seven vaginally delivered infants. The results of the study suggest that vaginal seeding partially restores the neonatal microbiome. However, the study authors acknowledged that the long-term consequences of vaginal seeding remain unclear due to limited data.

In 2017, a subsequent study was published which found that there was not a big difference, after six weeks, between the microbes of infants born vaginally versus those who delivered by C-section without receiving vaginal seeding. Certain scholars have pointed out that a baby's exposure to bacteria begins even before birth and more research is required on this matter.

== Risks ==
The scientific evidence regarding the short and long-term benefits of vaginal seeding, as well as the risks involved, is limited. Due to the widespread clinical advice given against performing vaginal seeding, there is insufficient support for the procedure. Following a nonclinical vaginal seeding procedure, there was a reported case of localized neonatal herpes simplex virus (HSV) infection, however, it cannot be supported that the infection was due to the procedure or another factor.

Infants delivered by C-section are at a lower danger of exchange of some potentially harmful microbes and infections from the birth canal. Although it remains unknown, vaginal seeding procedures may take these harmful microorganisms, including undetected sexually transmitted infections (STIs) and unintentionally transfer them to the infant. This could potentially cause an infection. It has been proposed that implementing a screening protocol for potential vaginal pathogens may be beneficial when considering vaginal seeding.

An editorial written in the British Medical Journal is advising practitioners and parents to not perform vaginal seeding as there is not enough evidence that it is beneficial for infants and could potentially put babies' health at risk.

The American College of Obstetricians and Gynecologists (ACOG) also does not encourage or recommend vaginal seeding due to lack of evidence.

== Additional areas of interest ==
Currently, the establishment of the infant microbiome including what influences are associated with optimal versus dysbiotic outcomes remains as a key component of health research. As of late, there have been only few studies evaluating the potential relationship between the maternal vaginal microbiome and the gut microbiome of the infant from the species or strain level. In context of the bacterial baptism hypothesis, this is essential, as merely reporting a genre (such as Lactobacillus) would fail to provide insight for the assessment of vertical transmission. Presence or absence of certain species within the same genre may greatly alter functionality, making further investigation into the implication of specie variation an important component of both further research of the vaginal microbiome and development of the infant microbiome. Additionally, maternal alterations in the intestinal microbiome during pregnancy may also play a role in the microbial colonization of vaginally delivered infants. When comparing stool samples from first and third trimester women, a 2012 study, Host remodeling of the gut microbiome and metabolic changes during pregnancy, discovered there is an increase in Proteobacteria as pregnancy progresses.

Given the potential maternal fecal contamination that is prone to occur during vaginal delivery, it is important to consider how alterations in the intestinal microbiome during pregnancy may influence microbial colonization of the infant. Furthermore, examination of the intestinal microbiome of infants born via cesarean versus vaginal delivery have revealed differences in colonization between the two groups however, further studies have suggested that the bacterial enzymes were not altered in the stool of these infants between the two delivery modes, making it unclear whether the type of microbe or the enzymatic activities and byproducts it produces are more important for the infant.

== See also ==
- Hygiene hypothesis
- Outline of obstetrics - the care of all women's reproductive tracts and their children during pregnancy, childbirth and the postnatal period
