= Jessica Green (academic) =

Researcher in biodiversity theory and microbial systems

Jessica L. Green
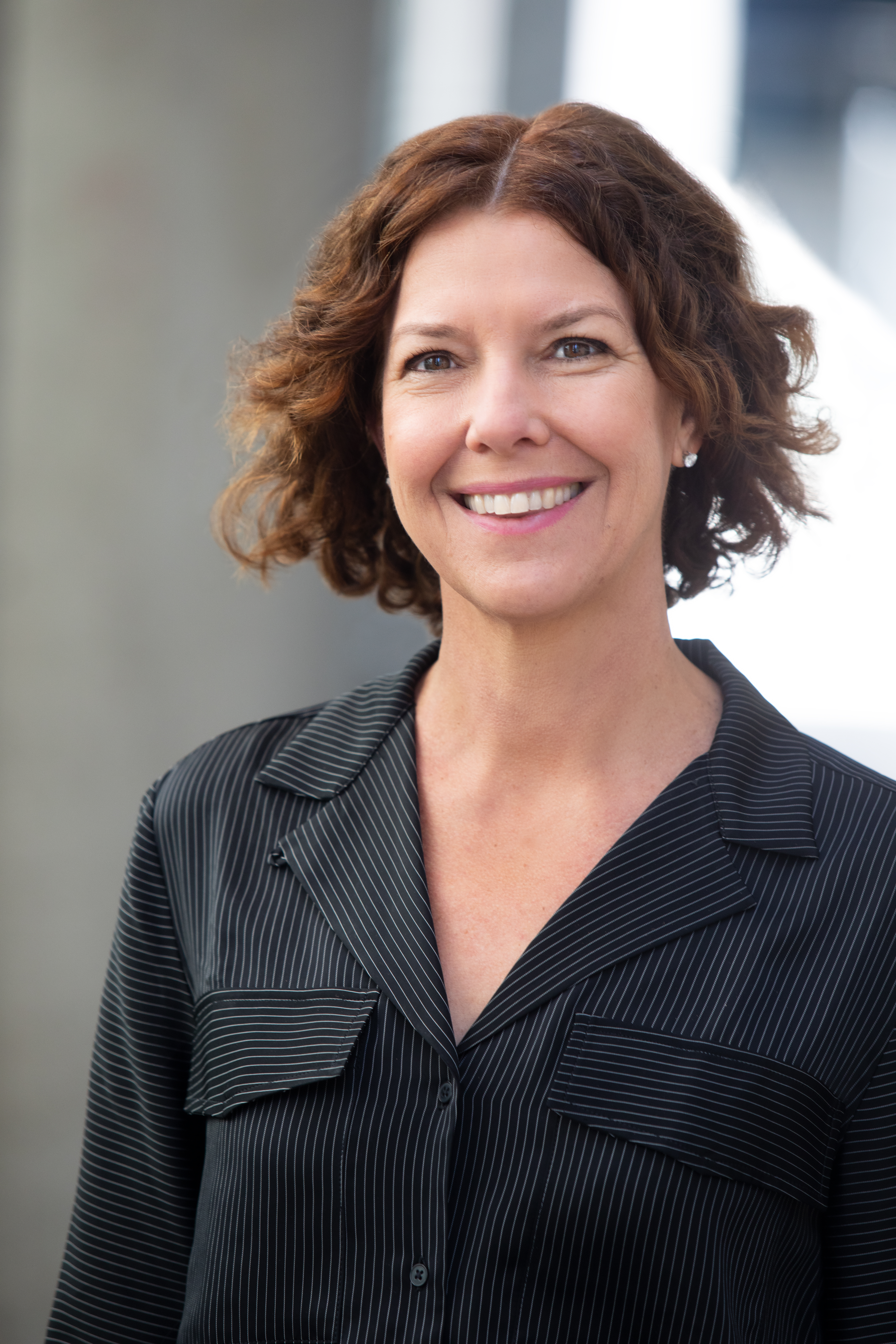
- Jessica L. Green
- Education: University of California, Los Angeles (BS 1992); University of California, Berkeley (MS 1995, PhD 2001)
- Scientific career
- Fields: Genomics; Microbiology; Microbial Ecology
- Workplaces: University of California, Merced; University of Oregon

Jessica Green is an American entrepreneur, engineer, and ecologist. She is CEO of Phylagen, Inc., a biotech startup developing tools to monitor the microbiology of air. Prior to Phylagen, she was a Professor of Biology at the University of Oregon and co-founding director of the Biology and Built Environment Center. Green’s two talks at the TED Conferences on the Microbiomes of the built environment have received over 1.7 million views.

== Education ==
Green studied civil engineering at the University of California, Los Angeles and graduated magna cum laude in 1992. She interned as an environmental engineer at the Defense Nuclear Facilities Safety Board while completing a M.S. degree in civil engineering from University of California, Berkeley in 1994. She received a Ph.D. in nuclear engineering in 2001 from University of California, Berkeley with a thesis on theoretical ecology, supervised by William E. Kastenberg and John Harte. She was a National Science Foundation Postdoctoral Fellow working with Mark Westoby and Alan Hastings on the application of genomic tools to microbial biogeography.

== Career ==
Green’s academic career focused on theoretical ecology and microbial biogeography in environments including soils, the phyllosphere, and the atmosphere. Her later work centered on microbiomes of the built environment. In 2015 Green co-founded Phylagen, Inc., a biotech company specializing in digitizing the indoor microbiome for health and safety. As a speaker at the TED conferences, she has presented on microbiology-derived insights for healthy and sustainable buildings. She serves on the Science Board of the Santa Fe Institute.

== Awards ==
Green is recipient of the TED Fellowship, Guggenheim Fellowship and Blaise Pascal International Research Chair.
