= Jessica Green =

Jessica Green may refer to:

- Jessica Green (academic), American engineer, ecologist, and entrepreneur
- Jessica Green (actress), Australian actress
