= Old Friends hypothesis =

Hypothesis on immune system development

The Old Friends hypothesis is the hypothesis that the human commensal microbiome has been substantially altered or reduced in humans living modern lifestyles. These changes, according to the hypothesis, have led to rapid increases in certain immunological and other diseases.

== Overview ==
The old friends hypothesis was first proposed in 2003. It is a modified version of the hygiene hypothesis, which suggests a link between early microbial exposure and immune system development. This is commonly believed to be related to environmental bacteria, improvements in hygiene and sanitation, or childhood infections. However, researchers such as Martin Blaser have proposed that most of the observed changes are mediated by commensal bacteria rather than pathogens or soil microbes. Additionally, it suggests that these commensals could influence other body systems.

== Evidence ==
The incidence of allergies, autoimmune diseases, and nonspecific inflammation has been increasing in developed nations for decades. Multiple potential reasons were proposed for this phenomenon. In the late 20th century, it was discovered that children with multiple older siblings and those living on farms had lower allergy rates than other children.

== See also ==
- Human microbiome
