= Hygiene hypothesis =

Medical hypothesis on development of immunity

In medicine, the hygiene hypothesis states that early childhood exposure to particular microorganisms (such as the gut flora and helminth parasites) protects against allergies by properly tuning the immune system. In particular, a lack of such exposure is thought to lead to poor immune tolerance. The time period for exposure begins before birth and ends at school age.

While early versions of the hypothesis referred to microorganism exposure in general, later versions apply to a specific set of microbes that have co-evolved with humans. The updates have been given various names, including the microbiome depletion hypothesis, the microflora hypothesis, and the "old friends" hypothesis. There is a significant amount of evidence supporting the idea that lack of exposure to these microbes is linked to allergies or other conditions, although it is still rejected by many scientists.

The term "hygiene hypothesis" has been described as a misnomer because people incorrectly interpret it as referring to their own cleanliness. Having worse personal hygiene, such as not washing hands before eating, only increases the risk of infection without affecting the risk of allergies or immune disorders. Hygiene is essential for protecting vulnerable populations such as the elderly from infections and combating emerging infectious diseases such as Ebola. The hygiene hypothesis does not suggest that having more infections during childhood would be an overall benefit.

== Overview ==
The idea of a link between parasite infection and immune disorders was first suggested in 1968 before the advent of large scale DNA sequencing techniques. The original formulation of the hygiene hypothesis dates from 1989, when David Strachan proposed that lower incidence of infection in early childhood could be an explanation for the rise in allergic diseases such as asthma and hay fever during the 20th century.

The hygiene hypothesis has also been expanded beyond allergies, and is also studied in the context of a broader range of conditions affected by the immune system, particularly inflammatory diseases. These include type 1 diabetes, multiple sclerosis, and also some types of depression and cancer. For example, the global distribution of multiple sclerosis is negatively correlated with that of the helminth Trichuris trichiura and its incidence is negatively correlated with Helicobacter pylori infection. Strachan's original hypothesis could not explain how various allergic conditions spiked or increased in prevalence at different times, such as why respiratory allergies began to increase much earlier than food allergies, which did not become more common until near the end of the 20th century.

In 2003, Graham Rook proposed the "old friends" hypothesis which has been described as a more rational explanation for the link between microbial exposure and inflammatory disorders. The hypothesis states that the vital microbial exposures are not colds, influenza, measles and other common childhood infections which have evolved relatively recently over the last 10,000 years, but rather the microbes already present during mammalian and human evolution, that could persist in small hunter-gatherer groups as microbiota, tolerated latent infections, or carrier states. He proposed that coevolution with these species has resulted in their gaining a role in immune system development.

Strachan's original formulation of the hygiene hypothesis also centred around the idea that smaller families provided insufficient microbial exposure partly because of less person-to-person spread of infections, but also because of "improved household amenities and higher standards of personal cleanliness". It seems likely that this was the reason he named it the "hygiene hypothesis". Although the "hygiene revolution" of the nineteenth and twentieth centuries may have been a major factor, it now seems more likely that, while public health measures such as sanitation, potable water and garbage collection were instrumental in reducing our exposure to cholera, typhoid and so on, they also deprived people of their exposure to the "old friends" that occupy the same environmental habitats.

The rise of autoimmune diseases and acute lymphoblastic leukemia in young people in the developed world was linked to the hygiene hypothesis. Autism may be associated with changes in the gut microbiome and early infections. The risk of chronic inflammatory diseases also depends on factors such as diet, pollution, physical activity, obesity, socio-economic factors, and stress. Genetic predisposition is also a factor.

== History ==
Since allergies and other chronic inflammatory diseases are largely diseases of the last 100 years or so, the "hygiene revolution" of the last 200 years came under scrutiny as a possible cause. During the 1800s, radical improvements to sanitation and water quality occurred in Europe and North America. The introduction of toilets and sewer systems and the cleanup of city streets, and cleaner food were part of this program. This in turn led to a rapid decline in infectious diseases, particularly during the period 1900–1950, through reduced exposure to infectious agents.

Although the idea that exposure to certain infections may decrease the risk of allergy is not new, Strachan was one of the first to formally propose it, in an article published in the British Medical Journal in 1989. This article proposed to explain the observation that hay fever and eczema, both allergic diseases, were less common in children from larger families, which were presumably exposed to more infectious agents through their siblings, than in children from families with only one child. The increased occurrence of allergies had previously been thought to be a result of increasing pollution. The hypothesis was extensively investigated by immunologists and epidemiologists and has become an important theoretical framework for the study of chronic inflammatory disorders.

The "old friends hypothesis" proposed in 2003 may offer a better explanation for the link between microbial exposure and inflammatory diseases. This hypothesis argues that the vital exposures are not common cold and other recently evolved infections, which are no older than 10,000 years, but rather microbes already present in hunter-gatherer times when the human immune system was evolving. Conventional childhood infections are mostly "crowd infections" that kill or immunise and thus cannot persist in isolated hunter-gatherer groups. Crowd infections started to appear after the Neolithic agricultural revolution, when human populations increased in size and proximity. The microbes that co-evolved with mammalian immune systems are much more ancient. According to this hypothesis, humans became so dependent on them that their immune systems can neither develop nor function properly without them.

Rook proposed that these microbes most likely include:

- Ambient species that exist in the same environments as humans
- Species that inhabit human skin, gut and respiratory tract, and that of the animals we live with
- Organisms such as viruses and helminths (worms) that establish chronic infections or carrier states that humans can tolerate and so could co-evolve a specific immunoregulatory relationship with the immune system.

The modified hypothesis later expanded to include exposure to symbiotic bacteria and parasites.

"Evolution turns the inevitable into a necessity." This means that the majority of mammalian evolution took place in mud and rotting vegetation and more than 90 percent of human evolution took place in isolated hunter-gatherer communities and farming communities. Therefore, the human immune systems have evolved to anticipate certain types of microbial input, making the inevitable exposure into a necessity. The organisms that are implicated in the hygiene hypothesis are not proven to cause the disease prevalence, however there are sufficient data on lactobacilli, saprophytic environment mycobacteria, and helminths and their association. These bacteria and parasites have commonly been found in vegetation, mud, and water throughout evolution.

Multiple possible mechanisms have been proposed for how the 'Old Friends' microorganisms prevent autoimmune diseases and asthma. They include:

1. Reciprocal inhibition between immune responses directed against distinct antigens of the Old Friends microbes which elicit stronger immune responses than the weaker autoantigens and allergens of autoimmune disease and allergy respectively.
2. Competition for cytokines, MHC receptors and growth factors needed by the immune system to mount an immune response.
3. Immunoregulatory interactions with host TLRs.

The "microbial diversity" hypothesis, proposed by Paolo Matricardi and developed by von Hertzen, holds that diversity of microbes in the gut and other sites is a key factor for priming the immune system, rather than stable colonization with a particular species. Exposure to diverse organisms in early development builds a "database" that allows the immune system to identify harmful agents and normalize once the danger is eliminated.

For allergic disease, the most important times for exposure are: early in development; later during pregnancy; and the first few days or months of infancy. Exposure needs to be maintained over a significant period. This fits with evidence that delivery by Caesarean section may be associated with increased allergies, whilst breastfeeding can be protective.

== Evolution of the adaptive immune system ==
Humans and the microbes they harbor have co-evolved for thousands of centuries; however, it is thought that the human species has gone through numerous phases in history characterized by different pathogen exposures. For instance, in very early human societies, small interaction between its members has given particular selection to a relatively limited group of pathogens that had high transmission rates. It is considered that the human immune system is likely subjected to a selective pressure from pathogens that are responsible for down regulating certain alleles and therefore phenotypes in humans. The thalassemia genes that are shaped by the Plasmodium species expressing the selection pressure might be a model for this theory but is not shown in-vivo.

Recent comparative genomic studies have shown that immune response genes (protein coding and non-coding regulatory genes) have less evolutionary constraint, and are rather more frequently targeted by positive selection from pathogens that coevolve with the human subject. Of all the various types of pathogens known to cause disease in humans, helminths warrant special attention, because of their ability to modify the prevalence or severity of certain immune-related responses in human and mouse models. In fact recent research has shown that parasitic worms have served as a stronger selective pressure on select human genes encoding interleukins and interleukin receptors when compared to viral and bacterial pathogens. Helminths are thought to have been as old as the adaptive immune system, suggesting that they may have co-evolved, also implying that our immune system has been strongly focused on fighting off helminthic infections, insofar as to potentially interact with them early in infancy. The host-pathogen interaction is a very important relationship that serves to shape the immune system development early on in life.

== Biological basis ==
The primary proposed mechanism of the hygiene hypothesis is an imbalance between the T_{H}1 and T_{H}2 subtypes of T helper cells. Insufficient activation of the T_{H}1 arm would stimulate the cell defense of the immune system and lead to an overactive T_{H}2 arm, stimulating the antibody-mediated immunity of the immune systems, which in turn led to allergic disease.

However, this explanation cannot explain the rise in incidence (similar to the rise of allergic diseases) of several T_{H}1-mediated autoimmune diseases, including inflammatory bowel disease, multiple sclerosis and type I diabetes. [Figure 1Bach] However, the North South Gradient seen in the prevalence of multiple sclerosis has been found to be inversely related to the global distribution of parasitic infection.[Figure 2Bach] Additionally, research has shown that MS patients infected with parasites displayed T_{H}2 type immune responses as opposed to the proinflammatory T_{H}1 immune phenotype seen in non-infected multiple sclerosis patients.[Fleming] Parasite infection has also been shown to improve inflammatory bowel disease and may act in a similar fashion as it does in multiple sclerosis.[Lee]

Allergic conditions are caused by inappropriate immunological responses to harmless antigens driven by a T_{H}2-mediated immune response, T_{H}2 cells produce interleukin 4, interleukin 5, interleukin 6, interleukin 13 and predominantly stimulate immunoglobulin E production. Many bacteria and viruses elicit a T_{H}1-mediated immune response, which down-regulates T_{H}2 responses. T_{H}1 immune responses are characterized by the secretion of pro-inflammatory cytokines such as interleukin 2, IFNγ, and TNFα. Factors that favor a predominantly T_{H}1 phenotype include: older siblings, large family size, early day care attendance, infection (TB, measles, or hepatitis), rural living, or contact with animals. A T_{H}2-dominated phenotype is associated with high antibiotic use, western lifestyle, urban environment, diet, and sensitivity to dust mites and cockroaches. T_{H}1 and T_{H}2 responses are reciprocally inhibitory, so when one is active, the other is suppressed.

An alternative explanation is that the developing immune system must receive stimuli (from infectious agents, symbiotic bacteria, or parasites) to adequately develop regulatory T cells. Without that stimuli it becomes more susceptible to autoimmune diseases and allergic diseases, because of insufficiently repressed T_{H}1 and T_{H}2 responses, respectively. For example, all chronic inflammatory disorders show evidence of failed immunoregulation. Secondly, helminths, non-pathogenic ambient pseudocommensal bacteria or certain gut commensals and probiotics, drive immunoregulation. They block or treat models of all chronic inflammatory conditions.

== Evidence ==
There is a significant amount of evidence supporting the idea that microbial exposure is linked to allergies or other conditions, although scientific disagreement still exists. Since hygiene is difficult to define or measure directly, surrogate markers are used such as socioeconomic status, income, and diet.

Studies have shown that various immunological and autoimmune diseases are much less common in the developing world than the industrialized world and that immigrants to the industrialized world from the developing world increasingly develop immunological disorders in relation to the length of time since arrival in the industrialized world. This is true for asthma and other chronic inflammatory disorders. The increase in allergy rates is primarily attributed to diet and reduced microbiome diversity, although the mechanistic reasons are unclear.

Observational research on agricultural environments, often referred to as the "farm effect", also supports the hypothesis. For example, a 2026 phenome-wide association study of youth in north-central Wisconsin found that while living on a farm was associated with higher odds of agricultural injuries and fungal skin infections, farm-raised youth had 20%–30% lower odds of respiratory illnesses and 30%–40% lower odds of mental health and neurological diagnoses compared to non-farm youth.

The use of antibiotics in the first year of life has been linked to asthma and other allergic diseases, and increased asthma rates are also associated with birth by Caesarean section. However, at least one study suggests that personal hygienic practices may be unrelated to the incidence of asthma. Antibiotic usage reduces the diversity of gut microbiota. Although several studies have shown associations between antibiotic use and later development of asthma or allergy, other studies suggest that the effect is due to more frequent antibiotic use in asthmatic children. Trends in vaccine use may also be relevant, but epidemiological studies provide no consistent support for a detrimental effect of vaccination/immunization on atopy rates. In support of the old friends hypothesis, the intestinal microbiome was found to differ between allergic and non-allergic Estonian and Swedish children (although this finding was not replicated in a larger cohort), and the biodiversity of the intestinal flora in patients with Crohn's disease was diminished.

=== Limitations ===
The hygiene hypothesis does not apply to all populations. For example, in the case of inflammatory bowel disease, it is primarily relevant when a person's level of affluence increases, either due to changes in society or by moving to a more affluent country, but not when affluence remains constant at a high level.

The hygiene hypothesis has difficulty explaining why allergic diseases also occur in less affluent regions. Additionally, exposure to some microbial species actually increases future susceptibility to disease instead, as in the case of infection with rhinovirus (the main source of the common cold) which increases the risk of asthma.

== Treatment ==
Current research suggests that manipulating the intestinal microbiota may be able to treat or prevent allergies and other immune-related conditions. Various approaches are under investigation. Probiotics (drinks or foods) have never been shown to reintroduce microbes to the gut. As yet, therapeutically relevant microbes have not been specifically identified. However, probiotic bacteria have been found to reduce allergic symptoms in some studies. Other approaches being researched include prebiotics, which promote the growth of gut flora, and synbiotics, the use of prebiotics and probiotics at the same time.

Should these therapies become accepted, public policy implications include providing green spaces in urban areas or even providing access to agricultural environments for children.

Helminthic therapy is the treatment of autoimmune diseases and immune disorders by means of deliberate infestation with a helminth larva or ova. Helminthic therapy emerged from the search for reasons why the incidence of immunological disorders and autoimmune diseases correlates with the level of industrial development. The exact relationship between helminths and allergies is unclear, in part because studies tend to use different definitions and outcomes, and because of the wide variety among both helminth species and the populations they infect. The infections induce a type 2 immune response, which likely evolved in mammals as a result of such infections; chronic helminth infection has been linked with a reduced sensitivity in peripheral T cells, and several studies have found deworming to lead to an increase in allergic sensitivity. However, in some cases helminths and other parasites are a cause of developing allergies instead. In addition, such infections are not themselves a treatment as they are a major disease burden and in fact they are one of the most important neglected diseases. The development of drugs that mimic the effects without causing disease is in progress.

== Public health ==
The reduction of public confidence in hygiene has significant possible consequences for public health. Hygiene is essential for protecting vulnerable populations such as the elderly from infections, preventing the spread of antibiotic resistance, and for combating emerging infectious diseases such as SARS and Ebola.

The misunderstanding of the term "hygiene hypothesis" has resulted in unwarranted opposition to vaccination as well as other important public health measures. It has been suggested that public awareness of the initial form of the hygiene hypothesis has led to an increased disregard for hygiene in the home. The effective communication of science to the public has been hindered by the presentation of the hygiene hypothesis and other health-related information in the media.

=== Cleanliness ===
No evidence supports the idea that reducing modern practices of cleanliness and hygiene would have any impact on rates of chronic inflammatory and allergic disorders, but a significant amount of evidence indicates that reducing hygiene would increase the risks of infectious diseases. The phrase "targeted hygiene" has been used in order to recognize the importance of hygiene in avoiding pathogens.

If home and personal cleanliness contributes to reduced exposure to vital microbes, its role is likely to be small. The idea that homes can be made "sterile" through excessive cleanliness is implausible, and the evidence shows that after cleaning, microbes are quickly replaced by dust and air from outdoors, by shedding from the body and other living things, as well as from food. The key point may be that the microbial content of urban housing has altered, not because of home and personal hygiene habits, but because they are part of urban environments. Diet and lifestyle changes also affects the gut, skin and respiratory microbiota.

At the same time that concerns about allergies and other chronic inflammatory diseases have been increasing, so also have concerns about infectious disease. Infectious diseases continue to exert a heavy health toll. Preventing pandemics and reducing antibiotic resistance are global priorities, and hygiene is a cornerstone of containing these threats.

=== Infection risk management ===
The International Scientific Forum on Home Hygiene has developed a risk management approach to reducing home infection risks. This approach uses microbiological and epidemiological evidence to identify the key routes of infection transmission in the home. These data indicate that the critical routes involve the hands, hand and food contact surfaces and cleaning utensils. Clothing and household linens involve somewhat lower risks. Surfaces that contact the body, such as baths and hand basins, can act as infection vehicles, as can surfaces associated with toilets. Airborne transmission can be important for some pathogens. A key aspect of this approach is that it maximises protection against pathogens and infection, but is more relaxed about visible cleanliness in order to sustain normal exposure to other human, animal and environmental microbes.

== See also ==
- Antibacterial soap
- Antifragility
- Diseases of affluence
- Germ theory of disease
- Helminthic therapy
- Hookworm
- Human microbiome
- Microbiomes of the built environment
- Vaginal seeding
