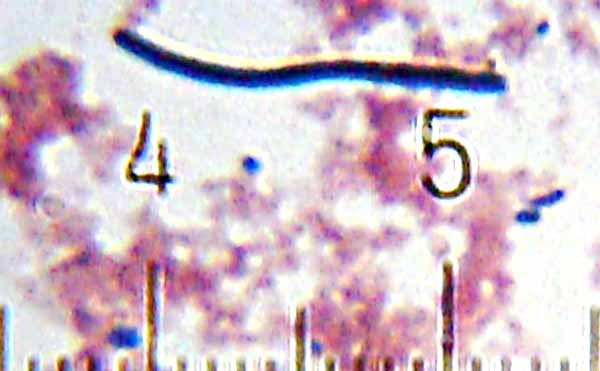
- Lactobacillus bulgaricus from a sample of yogurt. Numbered ticks are 10 μm apart.

Scientific classification
- Domain: Bacteria
- Kingdom: Bacillati
- Phylum: Bacillota
- Class: Bacilli
- Order: Lactobacillales
- Family: Lactobacillaceae
- Genus: Lactobacillus
- Species: L. delbrueckii
- Subspecies: L. d. subsp. bulgaricus

Trinomial name
- Lactobacillus delbrueckii subsp. bulgaricus (Orla-Jensen 1919) Weiss et al. 1984

Synonyms
- "Bacillus bulgaricus" Grigorov 1905; "Thermobacterium bulgaricum" Orla-Jensen 1919; Lactobacillus bulgaricus (Orla-Jensen 1919) Rogosa & Hansen 1971 (Approved Lists 1980)

= Lactobacillus delbrueckii subsp. bulgaricus =

Subspecies of bacteria used in yogurt

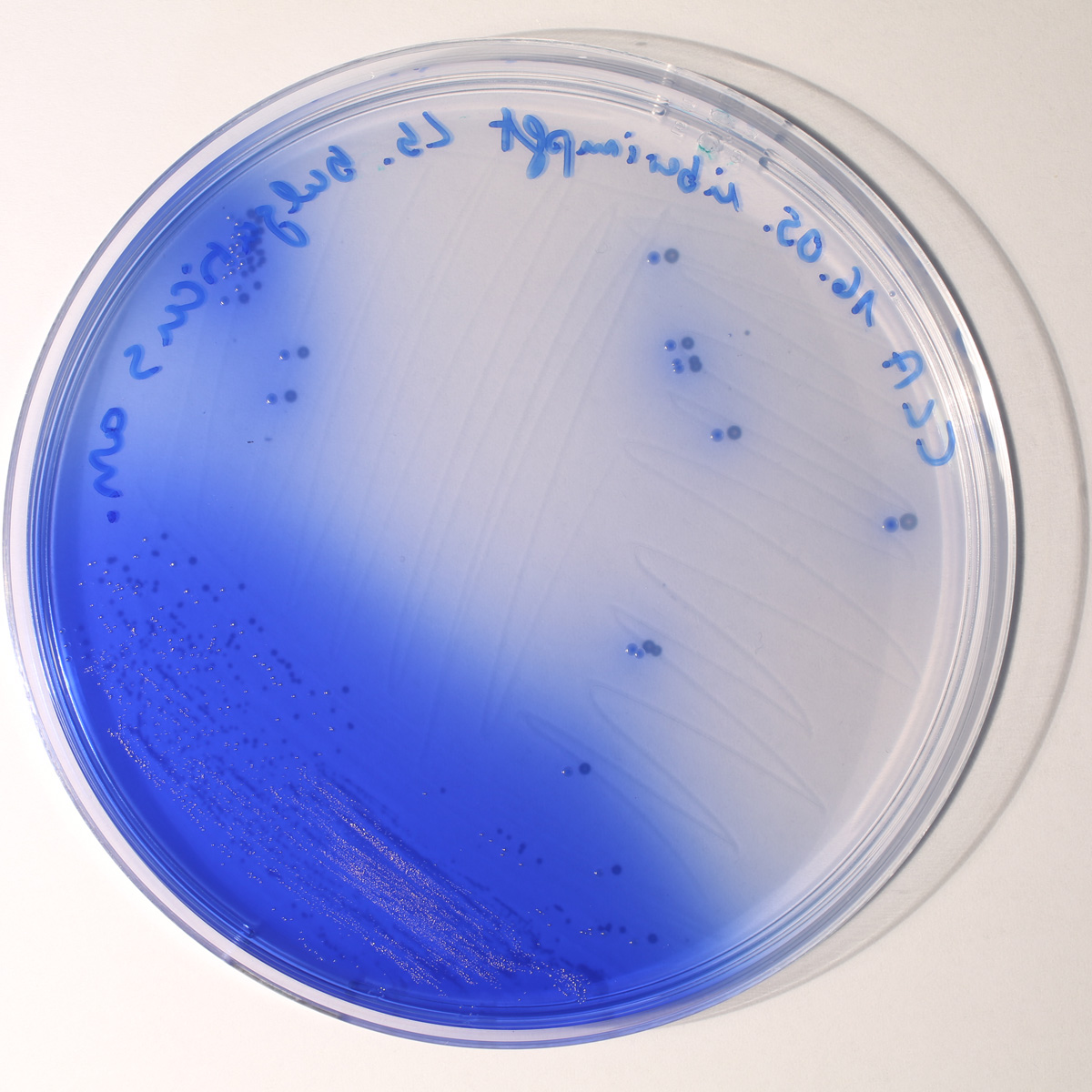
Lactobacillus bulgaricus colonies grown on China Blue Lactose Agar, after anaerobic incubation

Lactobacillus bulgaricus is the main bacterium used for the production of yogurt. It also plays a crucial role in the ripening of some cheeses, as well as in other processes involving naturally fermented products. It is classified as a homofermentative lactic acid bacterium because it converts carbohydrates primarily into lactic acid as its fermentation end product. It is also considered a probiotic.

It is a gram-positive rod that may appear long and filamentous. It is non-motile and does not form spores. It is also non-pathogenic. It is regarded as aciduric or acidophilic, since it requires a low pH (around 5.4–4.6) to grow effectively. In addition, it is anaerobic. As it grows on raw dairy products, it creates and maintains the acidic environment that it needs to thrive via its production of lactic acid. In addition, it grows optimally at temperatures of 40–44 °C under anaerobic conditions. It has complex nutritional requirements which vary according to the environment. These include carbohydrates, unsaturated fatty acids, amino acids, and vitamins.

First identified in 1905 by the Bulgarian doctor Stamen Grigorov by isolating what later termed Lactobacillus Bulgaricus from a Bulgarian yogurt sample, the bacteria can be found naturally in the gastrointestinal tract of mammals living in Sofia region and along the Balkan Mountain (Stara Planina) mesoregion of Balkan peninsula. One strain, Lactobacillus bulgaricus GLB44, is extracted from the leaves of the Galanthus nivalis (snowdrop flower) in Bulgaria. The bacterium is also grown artificially in many countries.

== Use ==
Lactobacillus delbrueckii subsp. bulgaricus is commonly used alongside Streptococcus thermophilus as a starter for making yogurt. The Lb. bulgaricus 2038 strain has been used for decades for yogurt fermentation. The two species work in synergy, with L. d. bulgaricus producing amino acids from milk proteins, which are then used by S. thermophilus. This relationship is considered to be symbiotic. Both species produce lactic acid, which gives yogurt its tart flavor and acts as a preservative. The resulting decrease in pH also partially coagulates the milk proteins, such as casein, resulting in yogurt's thickness. While fermenting milk, L. d. bulgaricus produces acetaldehyde, one of the main yogurt aroma components. Some strains of L. d. bulgaricus, such as L. bulgaricus GLB44, also produce bacteriocins, which have been shown to kill undesired bacteria in vitro. The viability of Lactobacillus delbrueckii subsp. bulgaricus is extremely important in that it is necessary for it to be efficient at fermentation and to effectively keep the food products it produces from spoiling. Freeze-drying is the preferred method of preserving the viability of the cells, but not all cells survive this process.

Due to its usefulness in natural fermentation processes, specifically in how it makes fermented food products out of cow's milk, it has great economic importance. Some of the biggest importers of the bacterium are Japan, the United States, and the European Union.

It has also been considered a contaminant of beer due to its homofermentative production of lactic acid, an off-flavor in many styles of beer. In other styles of beer, however, lactic acid bacteria can contribute to the overall appearance, aroma, taste, and/or mouthfeel, and generally produce an otherwise pleasing sourness.

== History ==
Lactobacillus delbrueckii subsp. bulgaricus was first identified in 1905 by Stamen Grigorov, who named it Bacillus bulgaricus.

Ilya Metchnikoff, a professor at the Pasteur Institute in Paris, researched the relationship between the longevity of Bulgarians and their consumption of yogurt. He had the idea that aging is caused by putrefactive activity, or proteolysis, by microbes that produce toxic substances in the intestine.

Proteolytic bacteria such as clostridia, which are part of the normal intestinal flora, produce toxic substances including phenols, ammonia and indols by digestion of proteins. These compounds are responsible for what Metchnikoff called intestinal auto-intoxication, which, according to him, was the cause of the physical changes associated with old age. It was already known at that time that fermentation with lactic acid bacteria inhibits the deterioration of milk because of its low pH.

Metchnikoff's research also noted that rural populations in Southeastern Europe and the Russian steppes daily consume milk fermented with lactic acid bacteria and live relatively longer than other populations. Based on these data Metchnikoff proposed that consumption of fermented milk seeds the intestine with harmless lactic acid bacteria increasing intestinal acidity and suppressing the growth of proteolytic bacteria. His results were questioned after a 1920 study showed that the bacterium could not survive in the human intestines, but the idea nevertheless started the research into actually useful probiotics.

Lactobacillus bulgaricus is a constituent in VSL#3.

In 2012 it was declared India's national microbe.

=== Taxonomic history ===
In bacterial taxonomy, the basionym for L. d. bulgaricus was "Thermobacterium bulgaricum" Orla-Jensen 1919. The entity became Lactobacillus bulgaricus in 1973 with the work of Rugosa and Hansen, and was reclassified as a subspecies under Lactobacillus delbrueckii in 1984.

== Research ==
=== Quantification in cow's milk cheese via real-time polymerase chain reaction assay ===
In 2017, there was a study involving the development of a real-time polymerase chain reaction (qPCR) assay for quantifying Lactobacillus delbrueckii subsp. bulgaricus as well as Streptococcus thermophilus in cow's milk cheese. The goal of this study was to create a way to identify and quantify Lactobacillus delbrueckii subsp. bulgaricus and Streptococcus thermophilus, two lactic acid producing species crucial to the fermentation and ripening of cheese, in a timely manner through the use of qPCR. Two assays using lacZ gene targeting PCR primers resulted from this study and were deemed compatible with the two lactic acid bacteria (LAB) species. This allowed for the direct quantification of Lactobacillus delbrueckii subsp. bulgaricus and Streptococcus thermophilus in cheese produced from unpasteurized cow's milk.

=== Effects on antigenicity of milk proteins ===
A study in 2012 posed the question of whether or not Lactobacillus delbrueckii subsp. bulgaricus had any effect on the antigenicity of four kinds of milk proteins, being α-lactalbumin (α-LA), β-lactoglobulin (β-LG), α-casein (α-CN), and β-casein (β-CN). These proteins are the main proteins found in cow's milk and are known to have antigenic properties in humans, especially young children and infants. 2–5% of young children and infants experience cow's milk protein allergy (CMPA), which has harmful effects on their development and may even result in death. This allergy is facilitated through the antigenicity of the milk proteins, which is the ability of the proteins to trigger an immune response in the body that can result in a number of possible allergic reactions. The study was performed by simulating digestion of unfermented milk and milk that was fermented through exposure to Lactobacillus delbrueckii subsp. bulgaricus to compare their antigenicities in order to see if fermentation had any effect on the antigenicity of the proteins. The antigenicities were measured through an enzyme-linked immunosorbent assay (ELISA). The results claimed that the fermentation of cow's milk by Lactobacillus delbrueckii subsp. bulgaricus reduced the antigenicity of α-LA and β-CN. However, it also increased the antigenicity of α-CN while β-LG was not impacted.

=== Subcellular membrane fluidity under cold and osmotic stress ===
The efficiency of lactic acid bacteria cryopreservation is not consistent and may lead to cell death. Lactobacillus delbrueckii subsp. bulgaricus has adapted to defend against cold stress. The way most cells react to the cold is by changing the fluidity of the cellular membrane, but this particular bacterium has acquired different tactics to fight against cold stress. The first way to cope with the cold is to increase viscosity by taking in compounds such as disaccharides, polysaccharides, amino acids and antioxidants. The second strategy used is performed by inducing active responses during the fermentation or post-fermentation processes. By modifying these it will change the temperature, pH and medium composition. This results in specific metabolic pathways becoming active, with the synthesis of cold shock proteins.

=== Survival during freeze-drying processes ===
In 2017, a study was done to see the effects of six different substances on the growth and freeze- drying of Lactobacillus. Using Lactobacillus as starter cultures for the dairy industry depends on the number of viable and active cells. Currently, the preferred method to preserve the bacterial cells is through freeze-drying, however this also results in some strains being killed. This is due to various complications of freeze-drying, including the formation of ice crystals, loss of membrane fluidity, and the denaturation of important macromolecules. Regardless, freeze-drying has been used for decades in microbiological research as a way to store and stabilize cultures. Six substances, being sodium chloride, sorbitol, mannitol, mannose, monosodium glutamate, and betaine were tested to determine if they had any effect on the survivability of the cells after freeze-drying. Three of the six substances added had a positive effect on the growth and freeze-drying of Lactobacillus, being sodium chloride, sorbitol, and sodium glutamate. The results suggest that these substances have protective effects on Lactobacillus delbrueckii subsp. bulgaricus in small concentrations, but have little effect or even some harmful effects in higher concentrations. The optimal concentrations for sorbitol, sodium chloride and sodium glutamate for the desired protective effects were 0.15%, 0.6%, and 0.09% respectively. This was shown to increase cell viability drastically.

=== Immunotherapy for cancer ===
According to Helen Nauts from Cancer Research Institute, on a monograph reviewing the effects of bacterial infections on multiple types of cancer, Ivan Bogdanov, a Bulgarian physician, allegedly produced a vaccine consisting of lactobacillus bulgaricus and used it to treat two patients with myeloma, inducing remission in the two cases, one dying 18 months later due to influenza, and another living 45 months (survival median at the time was about 12–18 months). However, references are internal documents and conversations among hospitals; there's no mention in English medical literature. An article from a commercial site and an alleged documentary are available (in Bulgarian).

== Bibliography ==
- Grigoroff, Stamen (1905). "Etude sur le lait fermenté comestible : le 'Kissélo-mléko' de Bulgarie". Revue Médicale de la Suisse Romande (in French). Genève: Libraires-Éditeurs. Librairie de L'Université. OCLC 717162535.
- Balows A, Truper HG, Dworkin M, Harder W, Schleifer KH (1992). "70". The Prokaryotes: A Handbook on the Biology of Bacteria (2nd ed.). New York: Springer-Verlag. p. 1547. ISBN 978-3-540-97258-7. OCLC 23767548.
