= Stamen Grigorov =

Bulgarian physician and microbiologist

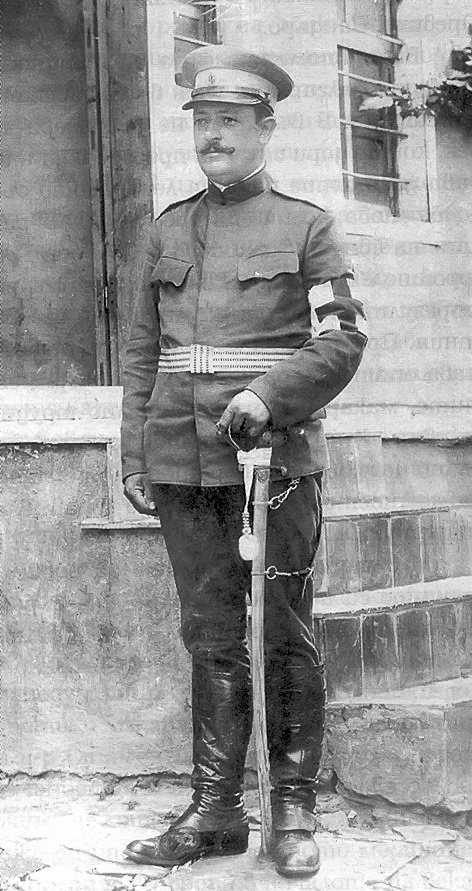
- Born: 27 October 1878; Studen Izvor, Principality of Bulgaria
- Died: 27 October 1945 (aged 67); Sofia, Kingdom of Bulgaria
- Education: University of Montpellier; University of Geneva
- Known for: Lactobacillus bulgaricus, tuberculosis treatment
- Scientific career
- Fields: Microbiology, medicine

Stamen Gigov Grigorov (Bulgarian: Стамен Гигов Григоров; 27 October 1878 – 27 October 1945) was a prominent Bulgarian physician and microbiologist. He discovered the Lactobacillus bulgaricus bacillus, used in the making of yogurt.

== Life ==
Stamen Grigorov was born in the village of Studen Izvor (lit. "Cold Spring"), Tran Municipality, Pernik Province, Bulgaria. He completed his secondary education in natural sciences in Montpellier, France and medical science in Geneva, Switzerland. In 1905, at the age of 27, Grigorov made the discovery for which he is best known. In the microbiological laboratory of Professor Léon Massol in Geneva, he discovered that a certain strain of bacillus is the basis of yogurt. In recognition the strain was called by the scientific community Lactobacillus bulgaricus.

In the 1950s, the Bulgarian, state-owned yogurt company patented and promoted a specific blend of bacterial strains to create an "official Bulgarian yoghurt". This blend continues to be exported to yogurt producers in many countries.

Apart from the discovery of Lactobacillus bulgaricus, Grigorov contributed to the creation of a tuberculosis treatment in 1906, along with Albert Calmette. This used Penicillium mold for the treatment of tuberculosis. Through his scientific experiments in-vitro and in-vivo on lab animals and later on human patients, Grigorov demonstrated the healing effect of Penicillium fungi in the treatment of tuberculosis.

Grigorov died on 27 October 1945, his 67th birthday.

== Legacy ==
Grigorov Glacier on Brabant Island in Palmer Archipelago, Antarctica is named after Stamen Grigorov.

On 27 October 2020, Stamen was honoured by Google as the Google Doodle of the day.
