= Microbiomes of the built environment =

Communities of microorganisms that live in human constructed environments

Microbiomes of the built environment is a field of inquiry into the communities of microorganisms that live in human constructed environments like houses, cars and water pipes. It is also sometimes referred to as microbiology of the built environment.

- The field has accelerated somewhat in recent years, with significant funding from the Alfred P. Sloan Foundation and with the increase attention being given to microbiomes and communities of microbes generally.
- The National Academies of Sciences, Engineering, and Medicine of the USA is conducting a study of this field with the study entitled "Microbiomes of the Built Environment: From Research to Application".
- The American Association for the Advancement of Science ran a symposium on the topic in 2014.
- The American Academy of Microbiology had a colloquium on this topic in September 2015 and published a report "Microbiology of Built Environments".

A 2016 paper by Brent Stephens highlights some of the key findings of studies of "microbiomes of the indoor environment". These key findings include those listed below:

- "Culture-independent methods reveal vastly greater microbial diversity compared to culture-based methods"
- "Indoor spaces often harbor unique microbial communities"
- "Indoor bacterial communities often originate from indoor sources."
- "Humans are also major sources of bacteria to indoor air"
- "Building design and operation can influence indoor microbial communities."

The microbiomes of the built environment are being studied for multiple reasons including how they may impact the health of humans and other organisms occupying the built environment but also some non health reasons such as diagnostics of building properties, for forensic application, impact on food production, impact on built environment function, and more.

== Studied environments ==
Extensive research has been conducted on individual microbes found in the built environment. More recently there has been a significant expansion in the number of studies that are examining the communities of microbes found in the built environment. Such studies have covered a range of environments.

- Buildings. Examples include homes, dormitories, offices, hospitals, operating rooms, NICUs, classrooms, transportation facilities such as train and subway stations, food production facilities (e.g. dairies, wineries, cheesemaking facilities, sake breweries and beer breweries, aquaria, libraries, cleanrooms, zoos, animal shelters, farms, and chicken coops and housing.
- Vehicles. Examples include airplanes, ships, trains, automobiles and space vehicles including the International Space Station, MIR, the Mars Odyssey, the Herschel Spacecraft.
- Water Systems. Examples include shower heads, children's paddling pools, municipal water systems, recirculating aquaculture systems, drinking water and premise plumbing systems and saunas.
- Other. Examples include art and cultural heritage items, clothing, kitchen sponges, and household appliances such as dishwashers and washing machines.

== Findings ==
=== General biogeography ===
Overall the many studies that have been conducted on the microbiomes of the built environment have started to identify some general patterns regarding the microbes are found in various places. Different areas and kinds of buildings are linked to different sorts of microbiota. Pakpour et al. in 2016 reviewed the patterns relating to the presence of archaea in indoor environments (based on analysis of rRNA gene sequence data).

=== Human health ===
Many studies have documented possible human health implications of the microbiomes of the built environment.

- Newborn colonization. The microbes that colonize newborns come in part from the built environment (e.g., hospital rooms). This appears to be especially true for babies born by C-section (see for example Shin et al. 2016) and also babies that spend time in a NICU.
- Risk of allergy and asthma. The risk of allergy and asthma is correlated to differences in the built environment microbiome. Some experimental tests (e.g., in mice) have suggested that these correlations may actually be causal (i.e., the differences in the microbiomes may actually lead to differences in risk of allergy or asthma). Review papers on this topic include Casas et al. 2016 and Fujimura and Lynch 2015. The microbiome of household dust is correlated to the childhood risk of allergy, asthma and phenotypes connected to these ailments. The impact of the microbiome of the built environment on the risk of allergy and asthma and other inflammatory or immune conditions is a possible mechanism underlying what is known as the hygiene hypothesis.
- Mental health. In a 2015 review Hoisington et al. discuss possible connections between the microbiology of the built environment and human health. The concept presented in this paper is that more and more evidence is accumulating that the human microbiome has some impact on the brain and thus if the built environment either directly or indirectly impacts the human microbiome, this in turn could have impacts on human mental health.
- Pathogen transmission. Many pathogens are transmitted in the built environment and may also reside in the built environment for some period of time. Good examples include influenza, norovirus, legionella, and MRSA. The study of the transmission and survival of these pathogens is a component of studies of microbiomes of the built environment.
- Indoor Air Quality. The study of indoor air quality and the health impact of such air quality is linked at least in part to microbes in the built environment since they can impact directly or indirectly indoor air quality.

=== Components of the Built Environment that Likely Impact Microbiomes ===
A major component of studies of microbiomes of the built environment involves determining how components of the built environment impact these microbes and microbial communities. Factors that are thought to be important include humidity, pH, chemical exposures, temperature, filtration, surface materials, and air flow. There has been an effort to develop standards for what built environment "metadata" to collect associated with studies of the microbial communities in the built environment. A 2014 paper reviews the tools that are available to improve the built environment data that is collected associated with such studies. Data covered in this review include building characteristics and environmental conditions, HVAC system characteristics and ventilation rates, human occupancy and activity measurements, surface characterizations and air sampling and aerosol dynamics.

=== Impact of Microbiomes on the Built Environment ===
Just as the built environment has an impact on the microbiomes found therein, the microbial communities of the built environment can impact the built environment itself. Examples include degradation of building materials, altering fluid and airflow, generating volatiles, and more.

=== Possible Uses in Forensics ===
The microbiome of the built environment has some potential for being used as a feature for forensic studies. Most of these applications are still in the early research phase. For example, it has been shown that people leave behind a somewhat diagnostic microbial signature when they type on computer keyboards, use phones or occupy a room.

=== Odor ===
There has been a significant amount of research on the role that microbes play in various odors in the built environment. For example, Diekmann et al. examined the connection between volatile organic emissions in automobile air conditioning units. They reported that the types of microbes found were correlated to the bad odors found. Park and Kim examined which microbes found in an automobile air conditioner could produce bad smelling volatile compounds and identified candidate taxa producing some such compounds.

== Methods ==
Many methods are used to study microbes in built environment. A review of such methods are some of the challenges in using them was published by NIST. Hoisington et al. in 2014 reviewed methods that could be used by building professionals to study the microbiology of the built environment. Methods used in the study of microbes in the built environment include culturing (with subsequent studies of the cultured microbes), microscopy, air, water and surface sampling, chemical analyses, and culture independent DNA studies such as ribosomal RNA gene PCR and metagenomics.

== See also ==
- Building science
- Microbial biogeography
- Microbial ecology
- Indoor air quality
