= Microbial biogeography =

Study of the distribution of microorganisms across space and time

Microbial biogeography is a subset of biogeography, a field that concerns the distribution of organisms across space and time. Although biogeography traditionally focused on plants and larger animals, recent studies have broadened this field to include distribution patterns of microorganisms. This extension of biogeography to smaller scales—known as "microbial biogeography"—is enabled by ongoing advances in genetic technologies.

The aim of microbial biogeography is to reveal where microorganisms live, at what abundance, and why. Microbial biogeography can therefore provide insight into the underlying mechanisms that generate and hinder biodiversity. Microbial biogeography also enables predictions of where certain organisms can survive and how they respond to changing environments, making it applicable to several other fields such as climate change research.

== History ==
Schewiakoff (1893) theorized about the cosmopolitan habitat of free-living protozoans. In 1934, Lourens Baas Becking, based on his own research in California's salt lakes, as well as work by others on salt lakes worldwide, concluded that "everything is everywhere, but the environment selects". Baas Becking attributed the first half of this hypothesis to his colleague Martinus Beijerinck (1913).

Baas Becking hypothesis of cosmopolitan microbial distribution would later be challenged by other works.

== Microbial vs macro-organism biogeography ==
The biogeography of macro-organisms (i.e., plants and animals that can be seen with the naked eye) has been studied since the eighteenth century. For macro-organisms, biogeographical patterns (i.e., which organism assemblages appear in specific places and times) appear to arise from both past and current environments. For example, polar bears live in the Arctic but not the Antarctic, while the reverse is true for penguins; although both polar bears and penguins have adapted to cold climates over many generations (the result of past environments), the distance and warmer climates between the north and south poles prevent these species from spreading to the opposite hemisphere (the result of current environments). This demonstrates the biogeographical pattern known as "isolation with geographic distance" by which the limited ability of a species to physically disperse across space (rather than any selective genetic reasons) restricts the geographical range over which it can be found.

The biogeography of microorganisms (i.e., organisms that cannot be seen with the naked eye, such as fungi and bacteria) is an emerging field enabled by ongoing advancements in genetic technologies, in particular cheaper DNA sequencing with higher throughput that now allows analysis of global datasets on microbial biology at the molecular level. When scientists began studying microbial biogeography, they anticipated a lack of biogeographic patterns due to the high dispersibility and large population sizes of microbes, which were expected to ultimately render geographical distance irrelevant. Indeed, in microbial ecology the oft-repeated saying by Lourens Baas Becking that "everything is everywhere, but the environment selects" has come to mean that as long as the environment is ecologically appropriate, geological barriers are irrelevant. However, recent studies show clear evidence for biogeographical patterns in microbial life, which challenge this common interpretation: the existence of microbial biogeographic patterns disputes the idea that "everything is everywhere" while also supporting the idea that environmental selection includes geography as well as historical events that can leave lasting signatures on microbial communities.

Microbial biogeographic patterns are often similar to those of macro-organisms. Microbes generally follow well-known patterns such as the distance decay relationship, the abundance-range relationship, and Rapoport's rule. This is surprising given the many disparities between microorganisms and macro-organisms, in particular their size (micrometers vs. meters), time between generations (minutes vs. years), and dispersibility (global vs. local). However, important differences between the biogeographical patterns of microorganism and macro-organism do exist, and likely result from differences in their underlying biogeographic processes (e.g., drift, dispersal, selection, and mutation). For example, dispersal is an important biogeographical process for both microbes and larger organisms, but small microbes can disperse across much greater ranges and at much greater speeds by traveling through the atmosphere (for larger animals dispersal is much more constrained due to their size). As a result, many microbial species can be found in both northern and southern hemispheres, while larger animals are typically found only at one pole rather than both. Furthermore, microorganisms, such as bacteria, are affected by conditions at very small scales that may differ from the scales that are typically considered for macro-organisms. For example, soil bacterial diversity is shaped by the carbon input and connectivity in microscale aqueous habitats.

== Distinct patterns ==
=== Reversed and non-monotonous latitudinal diversity gradients ===
Larger organisms tend to exhibit latitudinal gradients in species diversity, with larger biodiversity existing in the tropics and decreasing toward more temperate polar regions. In contrast, studies on indoor fungal communities and global topsoil microbiomes found microbial biodiversity to be significantly higher in temperate zones than in the tropics. Interestingly, different buildings exhibited the same indoor fungal composition in any given location, where similarity increased with proximity. Thus, despite human efforts to control indoor climates, outside environments appear to be the strongest determinant of indoor fungal composition. On the other hand, the strong biogeographical pattern of soil bacteria is typically attributed to changes in environmental factors such as soil pH. However, soil pH may be a biogeographical proxy that is affected by a soils climatic water balance, which mediates carbon inputs and the connectivity of bacterial aqueous habitats.

=== Bipolar latitude distributions ===
Certain microbial populations exist in opposite hemispheres and at complementary latitudes. These 'bipolar' (or 'antitropical') distributions are much rarer in macro-organisms; although macro-organisms exhibit latitude gradients, 'isolation by geographic distance' prevents bipolar distributions (e.g., polar bears are not found at both poles). In contrast, a study on marine surface bacteria showed not only a latitude gradient, but also complementarity distributions with similar populations at both poles, suggesting no "isolation by geographic distance". This is likely due to differences in the underlying biogeographic process, dispersal, as microbes tend to disperse at high rates and far distances by traveling through the atmosphere.

=== Seasonal variations ===
Microbial diversity can exhibit striking seasonal patterns at a single geographical location. This is largely due to dormancy, a microbial feature not seen in larger animals that allows microbial community composition to fluctuate in relative abundance of persistent species (rather than actual species present). This is known as the "seed-bank hypothesis" and has implications for our understanding of ecological resilience and thresholds to change.

== Applications ==
=== Directed panspermia ===
Panspermia suggests that life can be distributed throughout outer space via comets, asteroids, and meteoroids. Panspermia assumes that life can survive the harsh space environment, which features vacuum conditions, intense radiation, extreme temperatures, and a dearth of available nutrients. Many microorganisms are able to evade such stressors by forming spores or entering a state of low-metabolic dormancy. Studies in microbial biogeography have even shown that the ability of microbes to enter and successfully emerge from dormancy when their respective environmental conditions are favorable contributes to the high levels of microbial biodiversity observed in almost all ecosystems. Thus microbial biogeography can be applied to panspermia as it predicts that microbes are able to protect themselves from the harsh space environment, know to emerge when conditions are safe, and also take advantage of their dormancy capability to enhance biodiversity wherever they may land.

Directed panspermia is the deliberate transport of microorganisms to colonize another planet. If aiming to colonize an Earth-like environment, microbial biogeography can inform decisions on the biological payload of such a mission. In particular, microbes exhibit latitudinal ranges according to Rapoport's rule, which states that organisms living at lower latitudes (near the equator) are found within smaller latitude ranges than those living at higher latitudes (near the poles). Thus the ideal biological payload would include widespread, higher-latitude microorganisms that can tolerate of a wider range of climates. This is not necessarily the obvious choice, as these widespread organisms are also rare in microbial communities and tend to be weaker competitors when faced with endemic organisms. Still, they can survive in a range of climates and thus would be ideal for inhabiting otherwise lifeless Earth-like planets with uncertain environmental conditions. Extremophiles, although tough enough to withstand the space environment, may not be ideal for directed panspermia as any given extremophile species requires a very specific climate to survive. However, if the target was closer to Earth, such as a planet or moon in the Solar System, it may be possible to select a specific extremophile species for the well-defined target environment.

== See also ==
- Microbiomes of the built environment
- Microbial ecology
