= Alloscardovia omnicolens =

Scientific classification
- Domain: Bacteria
- Kingdom: Bacillati
- Phylum: Actinomycetota
- Class: Actinomycetes
- Order: Bifidobacteriales
- Family: Bifidobacteriaceae
- Genus: Alloscardovia
- Species: A. omnicolens

Binomial name
- Alloscardovia omnicolens (Huys et al. 2007)

Species of gram-positive bacterium

Alloscardovia omnicolens is a Gram-positive, rod-shaped bacterium within the family Bifidobacteriaceae that has been isolated from a number of human clinical samples. Though typically thought to be commensal in humans, A. omnicolens may be associated with urinary tract infections.

== Etymology ==
The genus name Alloscardovia comes from "allos", the Greek word for different, and "Scardovia", the name of a closely-related bacterial genera. This aligns with the naming convention of other relatives, Scardovia, Aeriscardovia, and Parascardovia. Omnicolens derives from "omnis", Latin for every and "colens", Neo-Latin for dwelling, because A. omnicolens dwells in many places in the human body.

== Taxonomy and phylogenetics ==
Alloscardovia omnicolens was previously classified as an atypical member of the Bifidobacterium genus. Huys et al. 2007 reclassified A. omnicolens within the new genus Alloscardovia, one of nine genera within the family Bifidobacteriaceae. This organism's closest relatives are other members of Alloscardovia, which also includes A. criceti, A. macacae, A.venturai, and A. theropitheci. 16s rRNA analysis, or comparison of the sequence of the small, highly conserved gene that codes for the 16s subunit of the ribosome, shows that A. omnicolens shares 96%-97.8% similarity with other members of the genus; its closest relative is A. criceti at 97.8% similarity. Other closely related species include Parascardovia denticolens and Scardovia inopinata, which share 93.0-93.2% and 92.9-93.1% 16s rRNA similarity, respectively.

== Discovery ==
Alloscardovia omnicolens was proposed as the type species for Alloscardovia as the first discovered species of its genus in 2007 following analysis of twelve isolated samples collected from tonsils, urethra, urine, and blood. The researchers were based in Belgium and Sweden at Ghent University, University of Göteborg, and University of Louvain at the time of publication.

=== Isolation ===
Huys et al. isolated and identified the Alloscardovia genus, along with specific species within the genus. Researchers obtained the strains from clinical samples at the University of Göteborg. Although the clinical samples were collected across decades (from 1978 to 2005), isolation and analysis of the samples and publication of findings did not occur until 2007. The strains were grown on modified Columbia agar plates with special peptone, starch, sodium chloride, and L-cysteine hydrochloride for isolation.

=== Methodology ===
The isolated strains were compared to known Bifidobacterium strains. The first method for comparison involved repetitive PCR fingerprinting, a process where primers, markers that target specific DNA sequences, form visual bands in gel electrophoresis that are used to compare DNA from various strains. The results from two primers provided evidence that the isolated strains were not Bifidobacterium. Potential phylogenetic trees were constructed by sequencing the genes for 16s rRNA and HSP60, another highly conserved protein that protects against protein misfolding in high heat. Lastly, DNA-DNA hybridization, a method where different strains' DNA is tested for similarity, yielded results that supported the four selected strains were the same species, which was named Alloscardovia omnicolens.

== Growth conditions ==
Unlike some members of the Bifidobacteriaceae family, A. omnicolens is able to grow under aerobic conditions, although anaerobic conditions are optimal. In anaerobic conditions, growth occurred after 24 hours on modified Columbia agar. Contrastingly, it took 72 hours for bacterial growth in aerobic conditions. A. omnicolens can grow at as low as 28 °C, optimally grows at 37 °C, and cannot grow at 50 °C.

=== Metabolism ===
All Alloscardovia species can ferment glucose, aesculin, salicin, maltose, melibiose, sucrose and raffinose, which differentiates them from other Bifidobacteriaceae. Fermentation of L-arabinose, raffinose, salicin, and D-xylose results in acid production, unique to A. omnicolens compared to other Bifidobacteriaceae. Alloscardovia species do not possess the catalase enzyme, meaning they cannot break down hydrogen peroxide. A. omnicolens is positive for β-galactosidase, an enzyme that breaks down lactose.

== Genomics ==
The reference genome of A. omnicolens from NCBI indicates a size of 1.8Mbp. A. omnicolens has 1,616 genes, with 1,528 of them coding for proteins. According to Huys et al., the G+C content of A. omnicolens DNA is between 47.3 and 48.3%mol. The G+C content of an organism is the amount of guanine and cytosine bases in the DNA sequence, increased amounts may indicate more stability. Killer et al. obtained the same results as Huys et al. for the species and concluded that the Alloscardovia genus has a range of 47.3 to 53%mol across three different species: A. omnicolens, A. macacae, and A. criceti.

== Ecology ==
Members of the Bifidobacteriaceae family are predominantly located in animal hosts. Bifidobacteriaceae ferment carbohydrates in the gastrointestinal tract, a potentially beneficial quality for their hosts' digestion. Since its discovery in 2007, A. omnicolens has been isolated only from human clinical samples, such as urine, tonsils, lungs, and the oral cavity. This is consistent with its family classification and indicates that the bacteria primarily survives in the human body. Research on the role of A. omnicolens in the human body has considered it commensal for the GI tract and oral cavity, a relationship where the bacteria populate their human host without causing harm. However, some research suggests A. omnicolens has a role in causing urinary tract infections.

== Clinical significance ==
A. omnicolens has been identified in samples from various locations of the human body, including the oral cavity, the urethra, urine, blood, and abscesses of the lung and the aortic valve. This organism is often thought to be a normal flora of the human oral cavity, gastrointestinal tract, and urogenital tract, but may play a pathogenic role in urinary tract infections. Of known instances of pure or predominant growth of A. omnicolens in urine cultures, some have co-occurred with UTIs. In a small number of those instances, A. omniocolens was identified as a possible or probable causative agent for the infection. The majority of clinical cases involving this organism have been in women, giving it special importance as an agent in women's health. Additionally, Ogawa et al. 2016 reported the first known case of bacteremia caused by A. omnicolens in a 70-year-old female patient with a urinary tract infection. Further study is needed in order to determine the true clinical significance of this organism in relation to UTIs, but its presence in urine cultures of patients with possible urinary tract infections, especially in female patients, should be carefully considered by clinicians.
