= Postbiotic =

Soluble factors released by bacteria

Postbiotics are preparations of dead microorganisms and/or their components that are believed to confer a health benefit on the host. Most such preparations are derived from bacteria believed to be beneficial (so-called probiotics), with most purported benefits having to do with the digestive tract.

In 2021, the International Scientific Association for Probiotics and Prebiotics (ISAPP) issued a consensus definition that helped align terminology across research and applications. The definition states that a postbiotic is "a preparation of inanimate microorganisms and/or their components that confers a health benefit on the host". Under this consensus, postbiotics include inactivated microbial cells or cell components, with or without co-present metabolites, but exclude substantially purified metabolites alone, vaccines, filtrates devoid of cell components, and purely synthetic compounds. The microbial source should be defined, and the inactivation process and matrix characterized.

== Terminology ==
Before the ISAPP consensus, related terms such as paraprobiotics (inactivated or non-viable microbial cells or their crude extracts), modified probiotics, ghost probiotics, and tyndallized probiotics were used in the literature. When the ISAPP criteria are met, postbiotic is recommended as the unifying term; paraprobiotics can be considered a subset emphasizing cellular components.

== Preparation ==
Postbiotics are obtained by deliberate inactivation of well-characterized microorganisms. In manufacturing for foods and supplements, physical inactivation methods are preferred to ensure safety and avoid chemical residues. Common approaches to killing include thermal processing (e.g., pasteurization, tyndallization) and non-thermal methods such as high-pressure processing, irradiation, and sonication.

=== Composition ===
Preparations may contain cell wall fragments (e.g., peptidoglycan, teichoic acids), surface proteins (e.g., S-layer proteins, pili), exopolysaccharides, and metabolites present in the matrix. Transparent reporting of the starting strain(s), inactivation method, and matrix is recommended.

=== Classification ===
==== IPA framework ====
The International Probiotics Association (IPA) proposed an industry-oriented decision tree and four subcategories for non-viable microbial ingredients used in foods/dietary supplements:

CX (complex non-viable microbial preparations)
unpurified culture medium containing intentionally inactivated cells and/or cell fractions
IC (intact non-viable microbial cells)
intentionally inactivated whole cells separated from the culture medium
FC (fragmented microbial cells)
intentionally fragmented cells (e.g., lysates/extracts) separated from the culture medium
MM (microbial metabolic products)
metabolic products in unpurified or partially purified culture medium.

Nature-identical synthetic components and single purified molecules are excluded and microbial origin is required. This framework aims to harmonize nomenclature, standardization and labeling in commercial contexts, and its scope may not fully align with all academic definitions.

== Research ==
Emerging evidence suggest that postbiotics have effects similar to probiotics.

=== Clinical research ===
Evidence is emerging across pediatric and adult populations, with reviews summarizing potential roles in gastrointestinal health (e.g., symptom management in functional bowel disorders), immune support (e.g., reducing common infections), and other areas. Small randomized trials in oral health have reported increased salivary IgA and improvements in oral hygiene outcomes with heat-killed strains or postbiotic lozenges.

Paraprobiotics/postbiotics have been evalulated for:

- Gastrointestinal diseases (bloating, paediatric disorders, infantile colic, diarrhea, extra-intestinal diseases)
- Upper respiratory tract infections
- Ocular disorders including eye fatigue

=== Preclinical research ===
In mouse models of loperamide-induced constipation, multi-strain probiotic formulations with a defined postbiotic added relieved constipation-related endpoints and were associated with shifts in gut microbiota composition, gastrointestinal regulatory transmitters, inflammatory cytokines, and fecal short-chain fatty acids. Separately, in vitro work with a mixed postbiotic preparation supports anti-inflammatory, antioxidant, and barrier-supporting activities, along with growth promotion of beneficial bacteria. These findings warrant confirmation in well-designed human studies.

There is a body of pre-clinical evidence suggesting the use of paraprobiotics in:

- Colitis-associated colorectal cancer
- Type 2 Diabetes (improved glycemic parameters)
- Liver injury
- Atopic dermatitis
- Influenza viruses
- Cardiac injury

== Proposed mechanisms ==
Proposed mechanisms include modulation of mucosal immune responses via microbe-associated molecular patterns interacting with host pattern-recognition receptors; support of epithelial barrier function (e.g., tight-junction signaling); antagonism against microbes via bacteriocins or organic acids; and systemic signaling influencing metabolic pathways. In vitro findings with a mixed postbiotic preparation have reported anti-inflammatory and antioxidant effects, increased expression of epithelial tight-junction genes, and promotion of beneficial bacteria.

== Safety and regulation ==
Because postbiotics are non-viable, they avoid risks related to microbial translocation or infection associated with live microbes. Nonetheless, safety should be evaluated case-by-case (e.g., endotoxin levels, processing residuals, immunological responses). Postbiotics are not a distinct regulatory category; products are typically evaluated under existing frameworks (e.g., foods, dietary ingredients, or medicines) [1, 4].

== Commonly used taxa ==
- Bifidobacteriales
- Bifidobacterium
  - Bifidobacterium breve
  - Bifidobacterium infantis
  - Bifidobacterium longum
- Lactobacillales
  - Enterococcus faecalis
  - Lactobacillaceae
    - Lactobacillus
      - Lactobacillus acidophilus
        - L. acidophilus fermentation product is approved as an over-the-counter drug in China under the name 乳酸菌素 (official English name: lacidophilin). It was invented in 1978.
      - Lactobacillus bulgaricus
      - Lactobacillus johnsonii
      - Lactococcus lactis
    - Lacticaseibacillus casei
    - Lacticaseibacillus paracasei
    - Lactiplantibacillus plantarum
    - Levilactobacillus brevis
    - Limosilactobacillus reuteri
    - Limosilactobacillus fermentum
    - Ligilactobacillus salivarius
  - Streptococcus salivarius subsp. thermophilus
