= Bifidobacterium thermacidophilum =

Scientific classification
- Domain: Bacteria
- Kingdom: Bacillati
- Phylum: Actinomycetota
- Class: Actinomycetes
- Order: Bifidobacteriales
- Family: Bifidobacteriaceae
- Genus: Bifidobacterium
- Species: B. thermacidophilum

Binomial name
- Bifidobacterium thermacidophilum Dong et al. 2000

Species of bacterium

Bifidobacterium thermacidophilum is a Gram-positive, rod-shaped species of bacteria. Strains of this species were originally isolated from an anaerobic digester used to treat wastewater from a tofu farm. The species is thermophilic and can grow at a temperature of 49.5 °C.

Strains of B. thermacidophilum have been experimentally used as probiotics. It was effective in reducing damage to the gut in a mouse model of E. coli infection.

B. thermacidophilum has been divided into two subspecies: subsp. Porcinum and subsp. Thermacidophilum.
