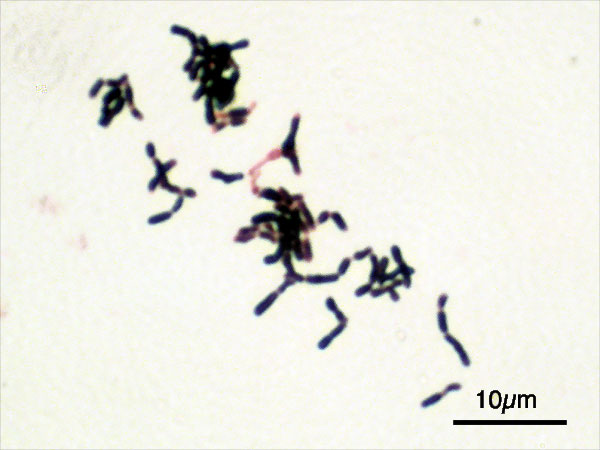
- Bifidobacterium adolescentis Gram stain

Scientific classification
- Domain: Bacteria
- Kingdom: Bacillati
- Phylum: Actinomycetota
- Class: Actinomycetes
- Order: Bifidobacteriales
- Family: Bifidobacteriaceae
- Genus: Bifidobacterium
- Species: B. adolescentis

Binomial name
- Bifidobacterium adolescentis Reuter 1963 (Approved Lists 1980)

= Bifidobacterium adolescentis =

Species of bacterium

Bifidobacterium adolescentis is an anaerobic species of bacteria found in the gastrointestinal tracts of humans and other primates. It is one of the most abundant and prevalent Bifidobacterium species detected in human populations, especially in adults.

== Research into health benefits ==
Bifidobacterium adolescentis has been studied for its health benefits, as strains have been shown to potentially protect against or improve recovery from several diseases, including liver-related, metabolic, allergic airway, colitis, arthritis, and bacterial infections. Strains have also been demonstrated to possess anti-inflammatory, anxiolytic, antioxidant, antidepressant, and/or antiviral activity.

In addition, B. adolescentis strains have been of interest for their ability to metabolize various compounds. This includes prebiotics such as arabinoxylan, XOS, and GOS. Some strains of B. adolescentis are also adept at metabolizing lactose, and may reduce symptoms associated with lactose intolerance. Like other bifidobacteria, B. adolescentis typically produce acetic acid and lactic acid, though the exact ratio depends on the bacterial strain, the carbohydrate being metabolized, and the growth conditions. Production of short chain fatty acids and lactic acid in the colon is associated with health benefits.

Bifidobacterium adolescentis contributes to the production of GABA, a neurotransmitter that plays a role in reducing stress and anxiety. Some B. adolescentis strains can also synthesize B vitamins, such as folic acid. One strain has been shown to be bifidogenic in the GI tract. That is, the presence of one B. adolescentis strain enhances the growth of all bifidobacteria, a group that generally confers positive health benefits and is important for healthy aging.

Some B. adolescentis have been shown to strengthen the intestinal barrier that is important in preventing pathogenic bacteria and toxins from traveling from the gut lumen into the body. Another study suggested the opposite effect: an undefined B. adolescentis strain was observed to disrupt gut barrier functions in colonic epithelial cell cultures.

Multiple probiotics are marked as containing B. adolescentis, however there are a limited number of commercially available strains (PRL2019, iVS‑1) with published scientific studies supporting their health claims.
