= Bifidobacterium ruminantium =

Scientific classification
- Domain: Bacteria
- Kingdom: Bacillati
- Phylum: Actinomycetota
- Class: Actinomycetes
- Order: Bifidobacteriales
- Family: Bifidobacteriaceae
- Genus: Bifidobacterium
- Species: B. ruminantium

Binomial name
- Bifidobacterium ruminantium Biavati and Mattarelli 1991

Species of bacterium

Bifidobacterium ruminantium is a bacterium found in bovine rumens.
