= Neoscardovia arbecensis =

Scientific classification
- Domain: Bacteria
- Kingdom: Bacillati
- Phylum: Actinomycetota
- Class: Actinomycetes
- Order: Bifidobacteriales
- Family: Bifidobacteriaceae
- Genus: Neoscardovia
- Species: N. arbecensis

Binomial name
- Neoscardovia arbecensis García-Aljaro et al. 2015

Species of bacterium

Neoscardovia arbecensis is a Gram-positive bacterial species, named as a new member of the family Bifidobacteriaceae, which already contained the genus Scardovia. It was isolated from pig slurries in the Spanish village of Arbeca as part of experiments identifying how feces cause water pollution. This species has also been isolated from farms producing traditional Iranian butter, capable of high cholesterol reduction while withstanding bile acids during digestion.

N. arbecensis is an anaerobic and mesophilic species, growing at 37°C, and its genome has 57% GC-content.
