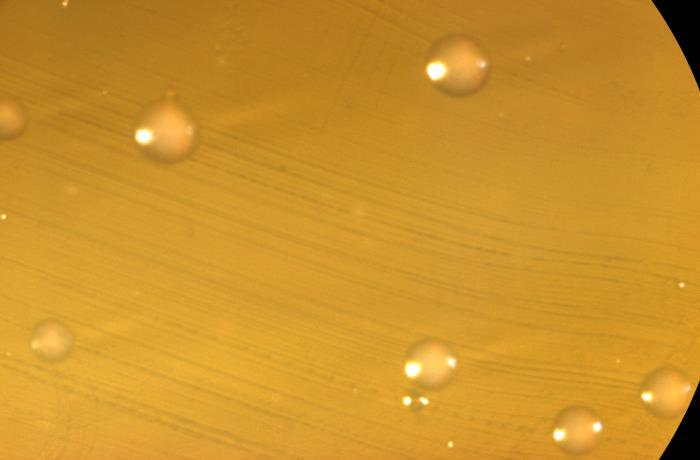
- Close view of Petri dish culture plate containing brain heart infusion (BHI) agar growth medium, inoculated with Bifidobacterium bifidum which, after a 42–72hr incubation period, has developed dewdrop-type bacterial colonies

Scientific classification
- Domain: Bacteria
- Kingdom: Bacillati
- Phylum: Actinomycetota
- Class: Actinomycetes
- Order: Bifidobacteriales
- Family: Bifidobacteriaceae
- Genus: Bifidobacterium
- Species: B. bifidum

Binomial name
- Bifidobacterium bifidum (Tissier 1900) Orla-Jensen 1924 (Approved Lists 1980)

Synonyms
- Tissieria bifida (Tissier 1900) Pribram 1929; Nocardia bifida (Tissier 1900) Vuillemin 1931; Lactobacillus parabifidus Weiss and Rettger 1938; Lactobacillus bifidus type II Weiss and Rettger 1938; Cohnistreptothrix bifidus (Tissier 1900) Negroni and Fischer 1944; Bifidibacterium bifidum (Tissier 1900) Prévot 1938; Bifidobacter bifidus; Bacteroides bifidus (Tissier 1900) Castellani and Chalmers 1919; Bacterium bifidum (Tissier 1900) Lehmann and Neumann 1927; Bacillus bifidus communis Tissier 1900; Bacillus bifidus Tissier 1900; Actinomyces parabifidus (Weiss and Rettger 1938) Pine and Georg 1965; Actinomyces bifidus (Tissier 1900) Nannizzi 1934; Actinobacterium bifidum (Tissier 1900) Puntoni 1937

= Bifidobacterium bifidum =

Species of bacterium

Bifidobacterium bifidum is a bacterial species of the genus Bifidobacterium. B. bifidum is one of the most common probiotic bacteria that can be found in the body of mammals, including humans.

== Structure and characteristics ==
B. bifidum is a Gram-positive, anaerobic bacterium that is neither motile nor spore-forming. The bacterium is rod-shaped and can be found living in clusters, pairs, or even independently. The majority of the population of B. bifidum is found in the colon, lower small intestine, breast milk, and often in the vagina.

B. bifidum (along with B. longum and B. breve) dominates in breastfed infants. With age, this composition alters in favor of other bifidobacteria species, and the total bifidobacteria population declines to lower but relatively stable levels.

B. bifidum is an essential bacteria found in the human intestine. When it is low or altogether absent in the human intestine, it is an indication of being in an unhealthy state. Intestinal flora can be improved if someone takes oral B. bifidum. Also, oral B. bifidum is used for other things such as therapy for enteric and hepatic disorders, for activating the immune response, and for preventing some cancers.

== Benefits ==
Various strains of B. bifidum have been shown to confer significant health benefits to their human host.

- Antibacterial activity: B. bifidum BF-1 and CECT 7366 exhibit activity against pathogens, including Helicobacter pylori.
- Gut health improvement: B. bifidum MIMBb75 and DSM 20082 help alleviate symptoms of irritable bowel syndrome (IBS) and certain chronic large bowel dysfunctions.
- Reduction of apoptosis: B. bifidum OLB6378 reduces apoptosis in the intestinal epithelium of infants with necrotizing enterocolitis.
- Immune modulation: ATCC 86321 and S17 influence immune responses by balancing inflammatory and anti-inflammatory activity.

Additionally, B. bifidum demonstrates strong adhesion to intestinal epithelial cells, a critical feature for its persistence in the gastrointestinal tract and its ability to provide health-promoting effects. This species also plays an essential role in establishing a balanced intestinal microbiota in newborns, working alongside B. breve and B. longum subsp. infantis.

== Health concerns ==
The manipulation of the gut flora is complex and may cause bacteria-host interactions. Although probiotics, in general, are considered safe, there are concerns about their use in certain cases. Some people, such as those with compromised immune systems, short bowel syndrome, central venous catheters, heart valve disease and premature infants, may be at higher risk for adverse events. Rarely, consumption of probiotics may cause bacteremia, and sepsis, potentially fatal infections in children with lowered immune systems or who are already critically ill.

== Maternal inheritance and persistence in gut microbiota ==
B. bifidum is among the first microbial colonizers of the infant gut, introduced through maternal transmission during birth and breastfeeding. This vertical transmission process facilitates the establishment of B. bifidum and other bifidobacteria, which are commonly found in both the mother's gut and milk. Studies using metagenomics and profiling techniques have identified specific strains of B. bifidum shared between mothers and infants, persisting in the infant gut for up to a year. Such maternal inheritance highlights the evolutionary relationship between bifidobacteria and their hosts, with maternal milk serving as a critical vector for colonization. This process can be disrupted under non-natural conditions like cesarean delivery or formula feeding.

Beyond early life, B. bifidum exhibits persistence in the human gut, albeit at lower abundances, throughout life. Its ability to persist is attributed to unique genomic features, including genes for extracellular structures like exopolysaccharides, pili, and enzymes involved in carbohydrate metabolism. These features enable B. bifidum to utilize complex dietary carbohydrates and host-derived glycans, such as mucin and human milk oligosaccharides (HMOs), providing a competitive advantage for colonization and resilience in the gut environment. Strains capable of metabolizing HMOs and mucin demonstrate higher resilience and are better equipped for long-term colonization, making B. bifidum a crucial contributor to gut health and microbial stability across life stages. Research suggests that the surface protein transaldolase (TAL) allows B. bifidum to bind to mucins MUC1 and MUC2, allowing metabolism of mucins as well as aiding in binding and colonization of the intestinal epithelium where B. bifidum can have contribute to gut health.

== Research on different Bifidobacterium strains ==
=== MIMBb75 ===
B. bifidum MIMBb75 is a probiotic strain isolated from a healthy adult. It is recognized for its strong adhesion to intestinal cells and its role in immune system modulation. The strain has demonstrated effectiveness in reducing symptoms of irritable bowel syndrome (IBS) and is available as a pharmaceutical probiotic product in encapsulated form.

=== BGN4 ===
B. bifidum BGN4 has been used in health products and dairy production since 2000. It offers multiple health benefits, including supporting immune health, reducing IBS symptoms, and aiding in eczema treatment. Research has also suggested anti-cancer properties and interactions with plant-based compounds. Recent genomic studies highlight its potential for broader applications.

=== PRL2010 ===
B. bifidum PRL2010 is noted for its immune-boosting effects, helping balance inflammation and promoting gut health. It can metabolize complex sugars in the gut, facilitating its colonization of the intestine. This strain also produces pili, which enhance its ability to adhere to intestinal surfaces and inhibit the adhesion of pathogens such as E. coli.

=== E3 ===
B. bifidum E3 in combination with B. longum subsp. infantis E4 has shown probiotic effect, aiding in reducing intestinal inflammation and improving gut microbiota in mice. Inflammation was reduced via suppression of NFκB/MAPK pathways and lower levels of pro-inflammatory cytokines (IL-1β, IL-6, and TNF-α). In vitro research into recombinant TAL protein of B. bifidum E3 suggests that this protein is able to inhibit this NF-κB pathway by preventing p65 nuclear translocation while upregulating PI3K and AKT signaling pathways. TAL therefore suppresses pro-proinflammatory cytokine IL-8, while also upregulating anti-inflammatory cytokine IL-10.
