= Bifidobacterium tsurumiense =

Scientific classification
- Domain: Bacteria
- Kingdom: Bacillati
- Phylum: Actinomycetota
- Class: Actinomycetes
- Order: Bifidobacteriales
- Family: Bifidobacteriaceae
- Genus: Bifidobacterium
- Species: B. tsurumiense

Binomial name
- Bifidobacterium tsurumiense Okamoto et al. 2008

Species of bacterium

Bifidobacterium tsurumiense is a Gram-positive, rod-shaped species of bacteria. Strains of this species were originally isolated from dental plaques from golden hamsters.
