= Cerelac =

Cereal brand

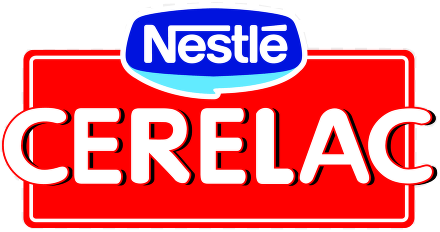
- Product type: Instant cereal
- Current owner: Nestlé
- Country: Switzerland
- Introduced: 1949; 77 years ago
- Website: nestle.com/cerelac

Cerelac is a brand of instant cereal made by Nestlé. The cereal is promoted for infants between 6 and 24 months old, as a supplement to breast milk when it is no longer the sole item in an infant's diet. Cerelac is not a substitute for breast milk, and it is advised to continue breast feeding or infant formula along with Cerelac. The product is also sold with the brand name Nestum.

The brand was first registered in 1949 and is sold in many countries.

== Ingredients ==
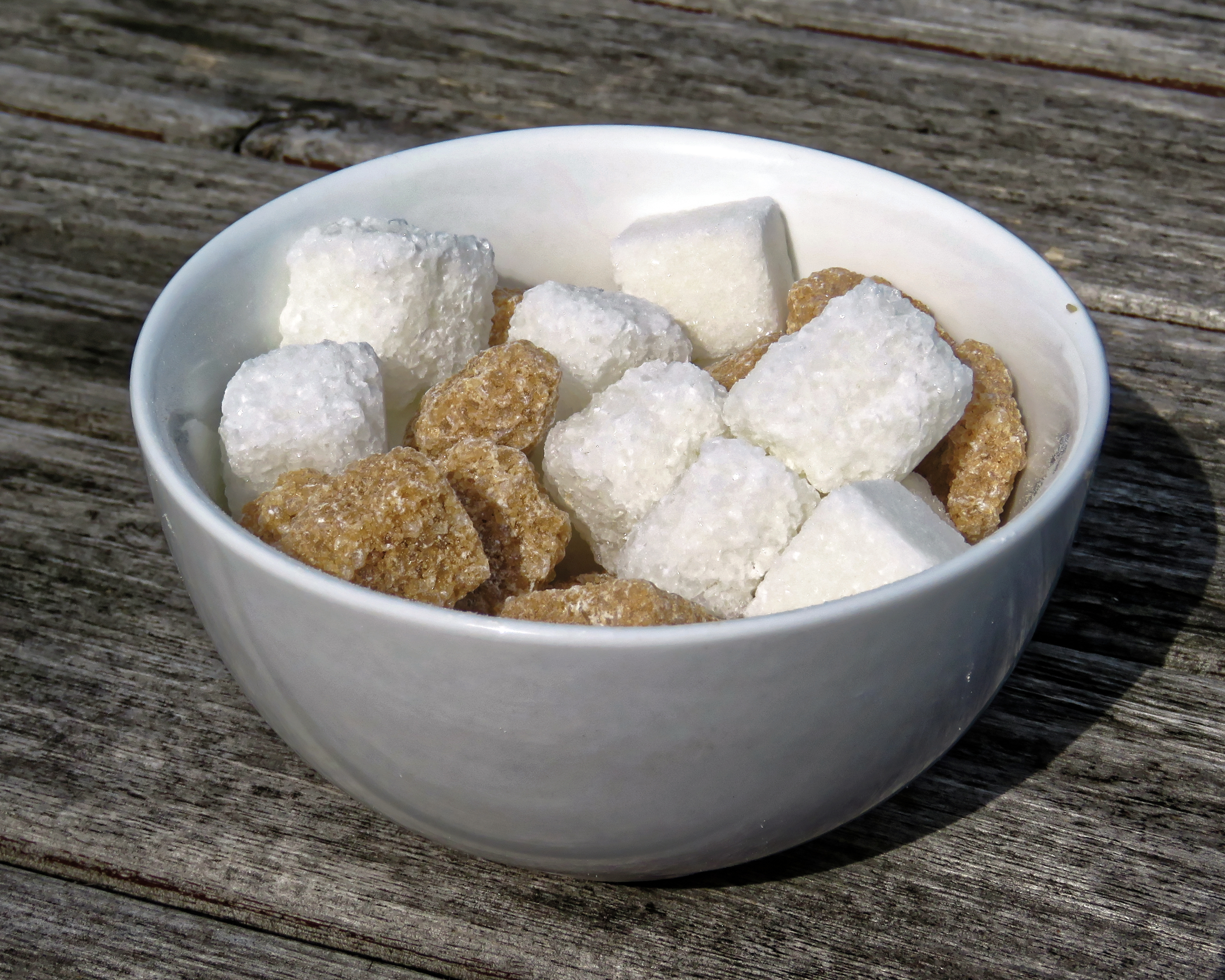
In developing countries, Cerelac contains, on average, as much added sugar as if one of these sugar cubes had been added to each serving.

Like any fortified infant cereal, Cerelac contains some vitamins and minerals such as iron, along with essential fatty acids. Cerelac products also contain probiotics that are found in the digestive tracts of breastfed babies.

The ingredients depend on which country the product is being sold in; specifically, Nestlé usually adds sugar to the cereal when it is being sold in poorer countries, which are not included when selling it in wealthier countries, to take advantage of the lenient laws.

However, the actual ingredients vary from place to place. In countries of Africa, Asia, and Latin America – but not the United States, the United Kingdom, and Germany – Cerelac usually contains between two and seven grams of added sugar. Laboratory testing indicates that, on average, the amount of added sugar per serving of cereal is similar to adding one sugar cube to each serving. There is no medical benefit to these empty calories, and it is believed that the added sugar promotes tooth decay and childhood obesity.

In many countries, sugar is legally allowed to be added to baby food, and the amount of added sugar is not legally required to be disclosed; Nestlé complies with the minimum requirements of the local laws, so it adds sugar when allowed and does not disclose the amount of added sugar on the packaging except when required to.

== History ==
Developed by Henri Nestlé to reduce infant mortality in the 1860s, he invented infant cereals using existing nutritional science and technology. The first product was called Farine Lactée and was alleged to have saved the life of premature baby boy named Wanner. By 1874, these infant cereals were sold in 18 countries. In the same year, vitamins were added. By 1948, they were marketed across the world. The brand was first registered in 1949.

As of 2014, Cerelac is currently sold in Kenya, Tanzania, Belgium, Denmark, Germany, Spain, Portugal, South America, Central America, North America, India, the Middle East, Nigeria, North Africa, Malawi, Nepal, Pakistan, Philippines, Ghana, Ivory Coast, South Africa, South East Asia, United Kingdom, Australia, Zambia and Zimbabwe.

After the non-profit Public Eye reported the widespread inclusion of sugar and honey in Cerelac against advice from the World Health Organization and medical experts, Nestlé India announced it would reduce the amount of added sugar by 30%.

== Marketing and sales ==
Nestlé uses undisclosed sponsorships by influencers on social media to promote their products. The company claims that their products help babies and young children grow stronger and become smarter and healthier. They have also used healthcare professionals to promote their products.

In 2022, sales for Cerelac exceeded US$1 billion worldwide, with India and Brazil being the biggest buyers. In Brazil, Cerelac is sold under the brand name Mucilon.

== Products ==
Cerelac baby cereals are available in 4 stages

Stage 1: (At 6–7 months old) is formulated for babies from 6 months onwards and is available in variants of CERELAC Wheat, CERELAC Rice and CERELAC Maize. This can be given to the baby as a baby's first food during the 6th month as these cereals are gelatin free and can be easily digested.

Stage 2: (7–8 months old,) can also be fed to infants from 6 months onwards and is available in CERELAC Banana and CERELAC Honey.

Stage 3: (8–12 months old) is available as CERELAC 3 Fruits and can be given to infants from 8 months onwards. This cereal contains real fruit pieces for different textures and tastes for babies who have chewing ability.

Stage 4 (12 months to 18 months) is for babies who are accomplished eaters and are ready to try food the family is eating. Stage 4 is available in options like multi-grain and fruits, multi-grain and Dal Veg and other variants. It also has the iron plus bundle (iron, Vitamin C, iodine, omega 3 and Vitamin B1) which can help in brain and cognitive development. The products in this stage also contain Bifidus BL probiotics that strengthen the baby's immune system and helps with his growth and development.

Stage 5 (After 18 months to 2 years) contains five grains and fruits combination which is made with fruits in textured shapes which are developmentally suitable for babies. Also contains wholegrain oats. The value added minerals, vitamins and fats enables the infant to gain health along with nutrition and taste.
