= Bifidobacterium dentium =

Scientific classification
- Domain: Bacteria
- Kingdom: Bacillati
- Phylum: Actinomycetota
- Class: Actinomycetes
- Order: Bifidobacteriales
- Family: Bifidobacteriaceae
- Genus: Bifidobacterium
- Species: B. dentium

Binomial name
- Bifidobacterium dentium Scardovi and Crociani 1974 (Approved Lists 1980)

Species of bacterium

Bifidobacterium dentium is a Gram-positive, non-spore forming, and nonmotile species of bacteria in the genus Bifidobacterium. B. dentium is usually identified in the oral cavity of humans where it is associated with the development of plaque and dental caries. It can transiently pass to the intestine leading to its detection in faecal samples. There are at least 38 different strains isolated from mammals. Genomic analysis have shown that B.dentium strains are highly conserved, with over 98.2% DNA sequence similarity across isolates from different mammals. Many strains possess CRISPR-Cas and restriction-modification systems, providing defense against viral infections and foreign genetic material.

B. dentium strains can be differentiated from other bifidobacteria based on their patterns of sugar fermentation. It is commonly isolated from the faecal samples of healthy babies and is found in both the adult and infant intestinal microbiome.

Bifidobacterium species, including B.dentium, are among the dominant members of the human intestinal microbiota and are widely considered beneficial bacteria. In addition to contributing to metabolic and immune functions, certain Bifidobacterium strains have been associated with reducing abdominal symptoms and improving tolerance to discomfort in functional gastrointestinal disorders such as irritable bowel syndrome.

== Microbiology ==
A study by Engevik, M.A., et al (2021) concluded that B. dentium encodes a range of enzymes that are utilised in the fermentation of pentose sugars. It also suggests that it can metabolize a number of growth substrates including sugars and amino acids. The study showed that in the absence of glucose, B. dentium can use 14 different sugars to sustain itself and aid growth, and can utilise 4 different amino acids as carbon sources to aid growth. The bacteria's flexibility in the growth substrates it can metabolize is likely what allows successful colonization of the GI tract.

== Habitat ==
=== Oral cavity ===
Scientists have shown that B. dentium can cause tooth decay in humans and so is considered an opportunistic cariogen. B. dentium is highly adapted for its niche in the human oral cavity. Its high tolerance to the acidic environment of the human mouth (pH 4.5) means B. dentium can sustain growth in the oral cavities, cause harm to the teeth, and break down sugars. Exposure to the full contents of ingested food means oral microbiota possess extensive catabolic ability for carbohydrates. B. dentium has a large glycobiome – a large number of genes allowing for the breakdown of sugars. Additionally, the B. dentium genome contains many genes for enzymes that assist in breaking down salivary glycoproteins.

The genome of the B.dentium Bd1 strain consists of a circular chromosome of 2.64 million base pairs and it is one of the largest among bifidobacteria, with 2143 genes. Its genome shows few signs of recent horizontal gene transfer, suggesting adaptation through vertical evolution. The genome encodes numerous genes enabling survival in acidic environments (down to pH 4), as well as genes for adhesive structures, exoenzymes, and proteases that contribute to its cariogenic potential.

=== Gastrointestinal tract ===
B. dentium is also a member of the gut flora, although it is likely not a dominant component of the mucosa-associated bifidobacteria. It adheres to the intestinal mucus layer which allows it to colonize, where it has been found to produce acetate and other metabolites.

== Use in identification of source of water pollution ==
The degradation of aquatic environments and potential risk to humans caused by faecal pollution makes it important to determine the source of the pollution. Detection of certain Bifidobacterium species in a sample can discriminate between human and animal faecal pollution. Two different rDNA probes can be used to identify the source of the pollution. One probe recognising the genetic material in a human exclusive strain of B. dentium, the other detecting other Bifidobacterium species in warm-blooded animals.

== Role in the microbiome ==
=== Mucin production ===
In the gastrointestinal tract mucins secreted by goblet cells form a protective like gel on the epithelium. Low levels of mucins are associated with inflammation. B. dentium adheres to intestinal mucus and secrets metabolites that upregulate major mucin MUC2 and modulate goblet cell function, leading to an increase in mucin production. Human derived B. dentium does not degrade mucin glycans, as it lacks the necessary enzymes.

=== GABA production ===
B. dentium has been identified by researchers at Baylor College of Medicine and Texas Children's Hospital as producing a neurotransmitter that may play a role in preventing or treating inflammatory bowel diseases such as Crohn's disease. This molecule, gamma-aminobutyric acid (GABA), is a major inhibitory neurotransmitter in the central and enteric nervous systems. GABA produced by B. dentium could have a role in decreasing inflammation associated with inflammatory bowel diseases. GABA has roles in many other biological processes.

Recent research has been conducted to see if GABA produced by B. dentium can reduce visceral hypersensitivity which is a key factor in conditions such as irritable bowel syndrome (IBS). B.dentium synthesises GABA via enzymatic decarboxylation of glutamate by the enzyme GadB (specifically required for production of GABA), which also contributes to acid resistance in the oral cavity.Studies have shown that GABA from B.dentium can reduce nerve sensitivity in the colon, suggesting potential probiotic applications for managing abdominal pain and functional gastrointestinal disorders.

=== Serotonergic system ===
The neurotransmitter serotonin (5-hydroxytryptamine) regulates gastrointestinal function. Enterochromaffin cells surrounding the gut release serotonin in response to food in the lumen, making the gut contract around the food. Some members of the human gut microbiome, such as B. dentium, can regulate production of serotonin. B. dentium production of acetate stimulates serotonin production from the enterochromaffin cells.

B. dentium is able to modulate the serotonergic system in the brain as well as the intestine. In mice, colonisation of the gut with B. dentium leads to increased serotonin receptor, Hrt2a, expression in the hippocampus. This change results in partial normalisation the abnormal reduced-anxiety phenotype found in germ-free mice which lack a gut microbiome.
