= LNBP =

LNBP may refer to:

- 1,3-beta-galactosyl-N-acetylhexosamine phosphorylase, an enzyme
- Liga Nacional de Baloncesto Profesional (LNBP), professional basketball league in Mexico
