= Bifidobacterium merycicum =

Scientific classification
- Domain: Bacteria
- Kingdom: Bacillati
- Phylum: Actinomycetota
- Class: Actinomycetes
- Order: Bifidobacteriales
- Family: Bifidobacteriaceae
- Genus: Bifidobacterium
- Species: B. merycicum

Binomial name
- Bifidobacterium merycicum Biavati & Mattarelli 1991

Species of bacterium

Bifidobacterium merycicum is a bacterium found in bovine rumens.
