= Bifidobacterium asteroides =

Scientific classification
- Domain: Bacteria
- Kingdom: Bacillati
- Phylum: Actinomycetota
- Class: Actinomycetes
- Order: Bifidobacteriales
- Family: Bifidobacteriaceae
- Genus: Bifidobacterium
- Species: B. asteroides

Binomial name
- Bifidobacterium asteroides Scardovi and Trovatelli 1969 (Approved Lists 1980)

Synonyms
- "Bacillus constellatus" White 1921

Species of bacterium

Bifidobacterium asteroides is a gram-positive, rod-shaped species of bacteria. Various strains of this species have been isolated from the hindguts of honey bees. Prior to 1969, this species was referred to as strains of Bacillus constellatus.
