= UTP—hexose-1-phosphate uridylyltransferase =

Class of enzymes

UTP:galactose-1-phosphate uridylyltransferase
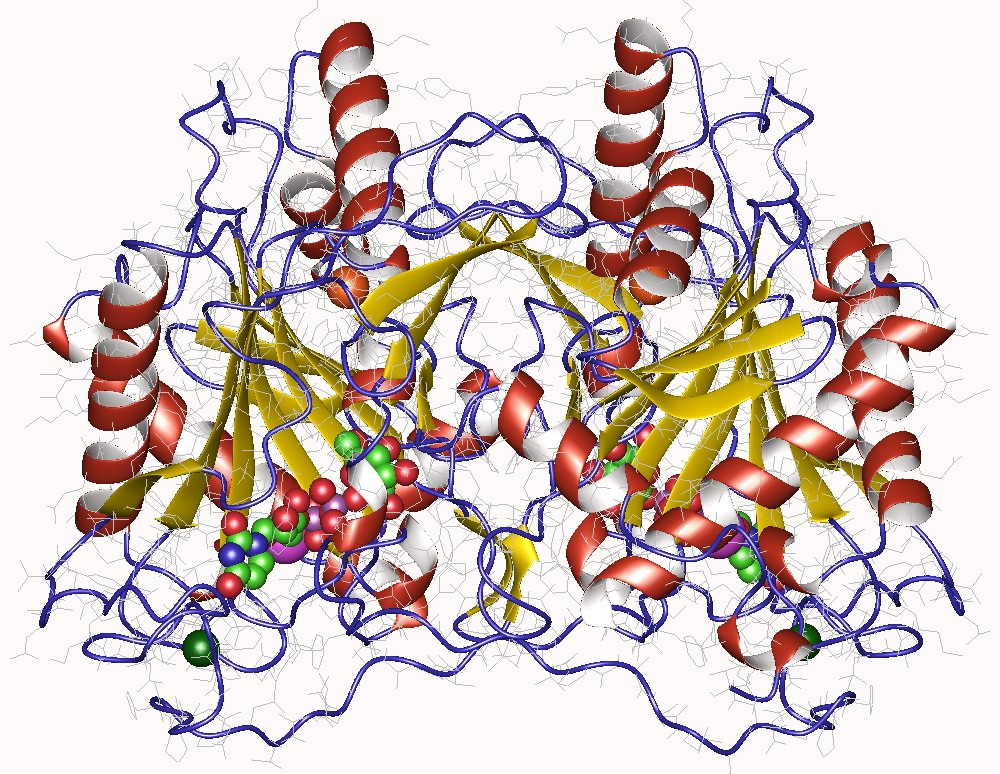
- UTP—galactose-1-phosphate uridylyltransferase homodimer, E.Coli

Identifiers
- EC no.: 2.7.7.10
- CAS no.: 9016-11-9

Databases
- IntEnz: IntEnz view
- BRENDA: BRENDA entry
- ExPASy: NiceZyme view
- KEGG: KEGG entry
- MetaCyc: metabolic pathway
- PRIAM: profile
- PDB structures: RCSB PDB PDBe PDBsum
- Gene Ontology: AmiGO / QuickGO
Search
- PMC: articles
- PubMed: articles
- NCBI: proteins

UTP—hexose-1-phosphate uridylyltransferase (EC 2.7.7.10) is an enzyme that catalyzes the chemical reaction

uridine triphosphate
+
galactose 1-phosphate
PP_{i}
uridine diphosphate galactose

The enzyme characterised from Bifidobacterium bifidum and Entamoeba histolytica combines uridine triphosphate and galactose 1-phosphate to give uridine diphosphate galactose, with pyrophosphate (PP_{i}) as a byproduct.

== Nomenclature ==
This enzyme is a transferase, specifically one transferring phosphorus-containing nucleotide groups (nucleotidyltransferases). The systematic name of this enzyme class is UTP:alpha-D-hexose-1-phosphate uridylyltransferase. Other names in common use include galactose-1-phosphate uridylyltransferase, galactose 1-phosphate uridylyltransferase, alpha-D-galactose 1-phosphate uridylyltransferase, galactose 1-phosphate uridyltransferase, UDPgalactose pyrophosphorylase, uridine diphosphate galactose pyrophosphorylase, and uridine diphosphogalactose pyrophosphorylase.

== Structural studies ==
As of late 2007, three structures have been solved for this class of enzymes, with PDB accession codes PDB: 1GUP, PDB: 1GUQ, and PDB: 1HXP.
