= Scardovia wiggsiae =

Scientific classification
- Domain: Bacteria
- Kingdom: Bacillati
- Phylum: Actinomycetota
- Class: Actinomycetes
- Order: Bifidobacteriales
- Family: Bifidobacteriaceae
- Genus: Scardovia
- Species: S. wiggsiae

Binomial name
- Scardovia wiggsiae Downes et al. 2011

Species of bacterium

Scardovia wiggsiae is a species of bacterium in the family Bifidobacteriaceae. In 2011, a study carried out using anaerobic culture conditions allowed the identification of a newly named species, Scardovia wiggsiae [], which was significantly associated with severe ECC (Early childhood caries, a particularly severe manifestation of carious pathology affecting children between birth and 71 months of age). The paper of Bossù et al. 2020 [] shows that S. wiggsiae forms biofilm and illustrates for the first time with high resolution scanning electron microscopy images the morphology of this bacterium and its biofilm. Images were obtained using original scanning electron microscopy protocol, the OsO_{4}-RR-TA-IL treatment. The biofilm had an intricate three-dimensional architecture made of Eps trabeculae, in this structure a complex micro-canalicular system was developed. S. wiggsiae has the aspect of an elongated bacterium, without pili or fimbriae. It forms clusters of bacteria embedded in the Eps scaffold.
