= Alloscardovia =

Scientific classification
- Domain: Bacteria
- Kingdom: Bacillati
- Phylum: Actinomycetota
- Class: Actinomycetes
- Order: Bifidobacteriales
- Family: Bifidobacteriaceae
- Genus: Alloscardovia; Huys et al. 2007

Type species
- Alloscardovia omnicolens

Genus of bacteria

Alloscardovia is a genus in the phylum Actinomycetota (Bacteria).

== Etymology ==
The name Alloscardovia derives from: Greek adjective allos, different; New Latin feminine gender noun Scardovia, a bacterial generic name; New Latin feminine gender noun Alloscardovia, organism related to, but different from, Scardovia and related genera.

== Species ==
The genus contains a single species, namely A. omnicolens ( Huys et al. 2007, (Type species of the genus).; Latin adjective omnis, every; Latin v. colere, to dwell; Latin participle adjective colens, dwelling; New Latin participle adjective omnicolens.
