= Proteobiotics =

Metabolites produced by probiotics

Proteobiotics are natural metabolites which are produced by fermentation process of specific probiotic strains. These small oligopeptides were originally discovered in and isolated from culture media used to grow probiotic bacteria and may account for some of the health benefits of probiotics.

Several genera of probiotic bacteria are known to produce proteobiotics, including Lactococcus spp., Pediococcus spp. Lactobacillus spp. and Bifidobacterium spp.

== Mode of action ==
Recent studies have explored mode of action of proteobiotics and their potential benefits in maintaining the ratio of beneficial bacteria, lowering bacterial imbalance, and improving gut function. However, any of the statements based on research have not been evaluated by the US Food and Drug Administration.

Unlike other molecules produced by probiotic bacteria, such as organic acids and bacteriocins, proteobiotics are natural metabolites which interfere with quorum sensing, the cell-to-cell communications which occur between bacterial cells, mainly by interfering with the LuxS quorum sensing system. These quorum-sensing systems allow bacteria to respond to changes in their environment and play a role in the ability of pathogens to evade host defence mechanisms. By interfering with quorum sensing, proteobiotics inhibit the cascade of events leading to adhesion to, and invasion of, host cells. This is achieved through reduced expression of specific virulence genes (typically found on pathogenicity islands) that facilitate the infection process. Specifically, proteobiotics inhibit virulence genes involved in toxin production, biofilm formation, cell adhesion and invasion. In enterohemorrhagic E. coli and Salmonella spp., genes associated with Type 3 Secretion Systems seem to be the main targets.

The degree to which proteobiotics can reduce virulence-gene expression depends on the pathogen and the source of the proteobiotics. Lactobacillus acidophilus-derived proteobiotics down-regulate virulence genes in enterohemorrhagic Escherichia coli, Clostridioides difficile, Salmonella Typhimurium, Listeria monocytogenes and Campylobacter jejuni. Whereas those produced by Bifidobacterium spp. have been shown to impact virulence gene expression in Campylobacter jejuni, enterohemorrhagic Escherichia coli, Clostridioides difficile, Clostridium perfringens, and Salmonella Typhimurium.
