= Bifidobacterium breve =

Scientific classification
- Domain: Bacteria
- Kingdom: Bacillati
- Phylum: Actinomycetota
- Class: Actinomycetes
- Order: Bifidobacteriales
- Family: Bifidobacteriaceae
- Genus: Bifidobacterium
- Species: B. breve

Binomial name
- Bifidobacterium breve Reuter 1963 (Approved Lists 1980)

Species of bacterium

Bifidobacterium breve is a bacterial species of the genus Bifidobacterium which has probiotic properties. Bifidobacteria are a type of bacteria that live symbiotically in the intestines of humans. They are Gram-positive, anaerobic, and non-motile, exhibiting a bifid (Y-shaped) morphology, as is characteristic of the genus. B. breve also shows a stronger affinity for immature bowels than other species, evidencing in its strong capabilities as a probiotic.

It is a dominant species in the gut of breast-fed infants and can be isolated from human milk. It has antimicrobial activity against human pathogens and does not possess transmissible antibiotic resistance traits. Not being cytotoxic, B. breve has immune-stimulating abilities to prevent side infections in preterm newborns along with chemotherapy and during antibiotic treatments. Paediatric diseases in which symptoms have improved upon B. breve strains being administrated include: Infant colic, Celiac Disease, Obesity, constipation, infant prematurity and NEC.

B. breve strain Yakult is another widely used probiotic strain and it is one of the first strains shown to have the ability to modulate the intestinal microbiota by reducing the count of several pathogenic bacteria such as campylobacter, Candida and Enterococcus.

== Clinical research ==
B. breve has been researched and linked to a number of conditions. Bifidobacterium breve administered in combination with prebiotics or other probiotics and standard therapy has shown some beneficial effect. B. breve is a constituent in the therapeutic, nutritional treatment of IBD. This proprietary standardized formulation of live bacteria is used to treat ulcerative colitis and may require a prescription.

B. breve may be linked to chronic obesity. A growing pool of evidence suggests that variations in the human gut microbiome correlate with excess weight gain. B. breve is a strong candidate for research concerning this issue. A study published in the Bioscience of Microbiota, Food and Health (BMFH) suggests that treating pre-obese patients with the B-3 strain of B. breve may stop or reverse obesity. However larger studies need to be performed to confirm these results.

Bifidobacteria and its link to stomach health are being researched along with its link to the brain through the microbiota gut–brain axis. Strain A1 of B. breve has undergone research concerning its effect on Alzheimer's. This research has consisted of mouse trials, and to date, shows promise in slowing or reversing the disease.

Gut colonisation begins at birth and there is evidence suggesting the existence of intrauterine transmission of maternal bacteria to the foetus. The way of childbirth strongly influences the first microbial colonisation of newborns gut. Children born by natural delivery tend to have an intestinal microbial profile that is similar to their mothers vaginal one while children born by caesarean develop a microbiota similar to that of the mothers skin.

Research also found that the type of feeding also affects the colonisation of microbial groups in the gut. The gut microbiota of forumal fed infants contain a lower amount of Bifidobacterium Breve with respect to breast-fed infants and this could be due to the abundance of these genera which have a more acidic pH in the colon of breast-fed infants.

For its properties as a probiotic, B. breve has also been found in food technology in the fermentation of milk. The positive effects associated to B. breve fermented soymilk has been reported in several studies, showing how it improves lipid metabolism, alcohol metabolism and mammary carcinogenesis in mice models.

== History ==
B. breve strains were originally isolated from the feces of human infants and represents one of the most used probiotics in infants. In 1971, Bifidobacterium parvulorum and Bifidobacterium breve were merged under the name Bifidobacterium breve. Bifidobacterium breve administered in combination with prebiotics, probiotics and standard therapy has shown some beneficial effect on gut health. B. breve is a constituent in the therapeutic, nutritional treatment of IBD. This proprietary, standardized, formulation of live bacteria is used to treat ulcerative colitis and may require a prescription.

== Characteristics ==
B. breve strains can ferment mannitol and sorbitol, but not arabinose or xylose.
