= Probiotics in children =

Overview of effect of probiotics on children

Probiotics are live microorganisms promoted with claims that they provide health benefits when consumed, generally by improving or restoring the gut flora. Probiotics are considered generally safe to consume, but may cause bacteria-host interactions and unwanted side effects in rare cases. There is little evidence that probiotics bring the health benefits claimed for them.

== Health effects ==
=== Diarrhea ===
As many prevention methods for diarrhea have adverse effects (e.g. intestinal intussusception in the usage of rotavirus vaccine), scientists are now turning to probiotics in hope of using it as a supplement to treat acute diarrhea. In a review that covered 34 masked, randomized, placebo-controlled trials related to diarrhea and probiotics, it was concluded that there was an overall reduction of 52% in antibiotic associated diarrhea, an 8% reduction in traveller's diarrhea, and a 34% reduction in other types of acute diarrhea. These numbers reflect a protective effect against diarrhea in subjects including both adults and children. In terms of children (age < 18 years), seven out of the 12 trials conducted in a health care setting showed a reduction in acute diarrhea of 57%. There was no significant difference in the protective effect of strains, namely Saccharomyces boulardii, Lactobacillus rhamnosus GG, Lactobacillus acidophilus, and Lactobacillus bulgaricus.

Probiotics were found to be effective in treating acute, infectious diarrhea in children when a review was completed in 2001, involving > 700 children aged from one to 48 months with acute diarrhea. A 2002 review showed that Lactobacillus reduced the average duration of acute diarrhea by 0.7 days and stool frequency by 1.6 on the second day of treatment. Dosage was most effective at more than ten billion colony-forming units of Lactobacillus during the first 48 hours of diarrhea. Moreover, there has been evidence showing that probiotics can prevent children and infants from gastroenteritis (also known as stomach flu), which may also cause diarrhea to occur.

==== Antibiotic-associated diarrhea ====
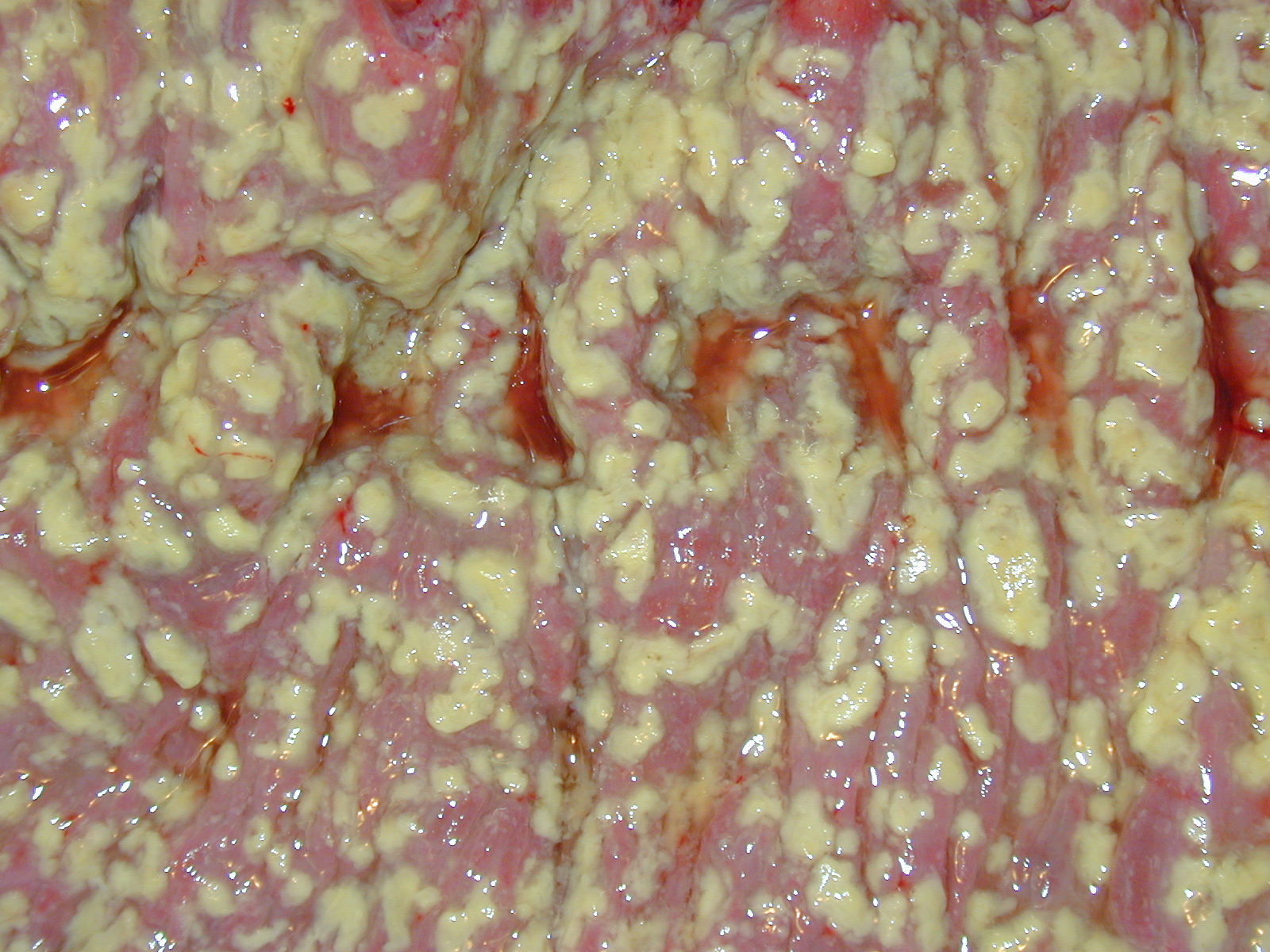
Pseudomembranous colitis.

This illness can generally be accounted for by Clostridioides difficile, a bacterium that can sometimes cause severe diarrhea known as pseudomembranous colitis. In a review of six trials related to antibiotic-associated diarrhea in 766 children aged one month to six years, there was an overall reduction in AAD when children were fed probiotics. The reduction, when compared to placebo, was seen to be from 28.5% to 11.9%; in fact, when patients were fed probiotics along with their dose of antibiotics, one fewer patient would develop AAD out of every seven. Antibiotics fed to the children in the trials included amoxicillin, penicillin and erythromycin. Evidence suggests that S. boulardii is best at preventing AAD in children, Lactobacillus GG ranking second, and a mixture of S. thermophilus and B. lactis relatively ranking last. No conclusion can be made on how probiotics can reduce the risk of AAD from any specific types of antibiotic.

One of the proposed mechanisms of how probiotics protect from AAD is by regulating the composition of organisms in the intestines. Studies involving L. acidophilus and Bifidobacterium suggest that these microbes inhibit the growth of facultative anaerobic bacteria, which tends to increase during antibiotic treatment. As a result, it is seen that probiotics can alter and prevent changes in the intestinal microflora caused by antibiotics.

==== Viral diarrhea ====
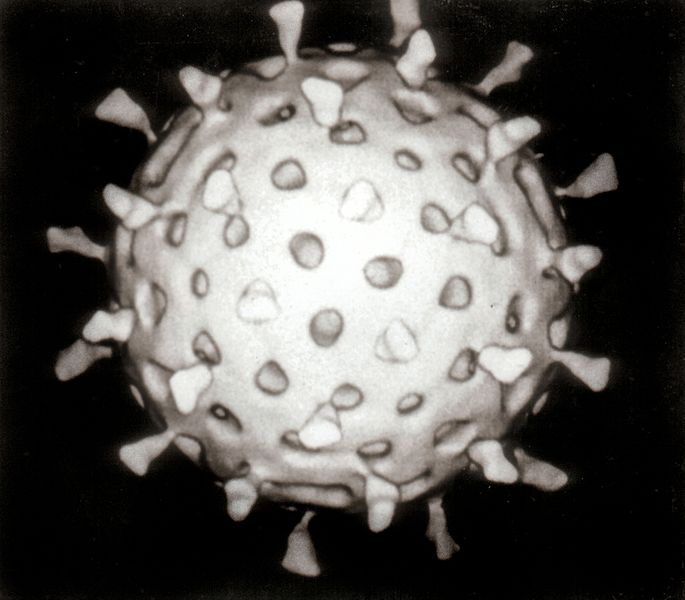
a three dimensional model of Rotavirus.

Viral diarrhea refers to the type of diarrhea that is caused by a rotavirus, a virus often impacting toddlers and infants. A meta-analysis of nine previously conducted studies (those studies were conducted in Canada, Thailand, and Finland) has shown that certain types of probiotics are also effective in treating viral diarrhea in hospital-admitted children. Subjects of those studies ranged from one to above 36 months old. The study results showed that the duration of the illness was shortened by 0.7 days on average when placing the children on Lactobacillus therapy.

Although it is still largely unknown as to how probiotics do this, two mechanisms have been currently proposed. The first mechanism suggests that Lactobacilli augment the development of intestinal mucins (glyosylated proteins), which consequently protect the body from intestinal infections.

==== Persistent diarrhea ====
A 2013 review suggested probiotics are effective in treating persistent diarrhea in children, though more research is needed. Persistent diarrhea is an episode that starts acutely but then lasts for 14 days or more; In developing countries it is an important cause of morbidity and mortality in children under five years old. The study showed average duration reduced by four days and shorter hospital stay; stool frequency was reduced on the fifth day.

=== Allergy ===
Probiotics are commonly given to breast-feeding mothers and their young children to prevent eczema, but some doubt exists over the strength of evidence supporting this practice.

== Safety ==
"Documented correlations between systemic infections and probiotic consumption are few and all occurred in patients with underlying medical conditions." Rarely, consumption of probiotics may cause bacteremia, fungemia and sepsis in children with lowered immune systems who are already critically ill. There are no adverse effects from Lactobacillus ingestion.
