= 1,3-beta-galactosyl-N-acetylhexosamine phosphorylase =

Class of enzymes

Identifiers
- EC no.: 2.4.1.211

Databases
- IntEnz: IntEnz view
- BRENDA: BRENDA entry
- ExPASy: NiceZyme view
- KEGG: KEGG entry
- MetaCyc: metabolic pathway
- PRIAM: profile
- PDB structures: RCSB PDB PDBe PDBsum
- Gene Ontology: AmiGO / QuickGO
Search
- PMC: articles
- PubMed: articles
- NCBI: proteins

1,3-beta-galactosyl-N-acetylhexosamine phosphorylase (EC 2.4.1.211) is an enzyme that catalyzes the chemical reaction

lacto-N-biose
P_{i}
galactose 1-phosphate
+
N-acetyl-D-glucosamine

The two substrates of this enzyme characterised from Bifidobacterium bifidum are lacto-N-biose (β-D-galactopyranosyl-(1->3)-N-acetyl-D-glucosamine) and orthophosphate (P_{i}). Its products are galactose 1-phosphate and N-acetyl-D-glucosamine.

This enzyme belongs to the family of glycosyltransferases, specifically the hexosyltransferases. The systematic name of this enzyme class is beta-D-galactopyranosyl-(1->3)-N-acetyl-D-hexosamine:phosphate galactosyltransferase.
