= Aeriscardovia aeriphila =

Scientific classification
- Domain: Bacteria
- Kingdom: Bacillati
- Phylum: Actinomycetota
- Class: Actinomycetes
- Order: Bifidobacteriales
- Family: Bifidobacteriaceae
- Genus: Aeriscardovia; Simpson et al. 2004
- Species: A. aeriphila

Binomial name
- Aeriscardovia aeriphila Simpson et al. 2004

Type strain
- DSM 22365; JCM 15959; LMG 21773; NCIMB 13939; T6

Species of bacteria

Aeriscardovia aeriphila is a species of bacteria in the phylum Actinomycetota.

== Etymology ==
The name Aeriscardovia derives from: Latin masculine gender noun aer aeris, air; Neo-Latin feminine gender noun Scardovia, a bacterial generic name to honor Vittorio Scardovi, an Italian microbiologist; Neo-Latin feminine gender noun Aeriscardovia, cells similar to the genus Scardovia that can grow in air.

The species epithet (aeriphila) drives from: Latin masculine gender noun aer aeris, air; Neo-Latin adjective philus from Greek adjective philos (φίλος) meaning friend, loving; Neo-Latin feminine gender adjective aeriphila, air-loving.)

This species was isolated from the intestines of a pig.

== See also ==
- Bacterial taxonomy
- Microbiology
