= Escherichia coli Nissle 1917 =

Escherichia coli strain Nissle 1917

Scientific classification
- Domain: Bacteria
- Kingdom: Pseudomonadati
- Phylum: Pseudomonadota
- Class: Gammaproteobacteria
- Order: Enterobacterales
- Family: Enterobacteriaceae
- Genus: Escherichia
- Species: E. coli
- Strain: E. c. strain Nissle 1917

Trionomial name
- Escherichia coli strain Nissle 1917

Strain of bacteria

Escherichia coli Nissle 1917 (brand name Mutaflor) is a strain of Escherichia coli that was isolated from the feces of a German soldier in 1917 by the German researcher Alfred Nissle. Nissle isolated the bacteria from a soldier that appeared to be unaffected by Shigella bacteria. Nissle suspected this soldier to carry an antagonistically strong E. coli strain that might have protected him from catching dysentery. In fact, this soldier carried an E. coli strain (later named strain Nissle 1917) that in laboratory tests showed strong antagonistic activity against pathogenic gut bacteria. Since that time it has been widely studied as a probiotic and several marketed probiotics include it and naturally colonizes the human intestines and has positive probiotic properties. In one small study, 4 out of 7 people who took it daily for a week had detectable amounts in their feces. The exact reasons for colonization are unknown. It is known that the F1C fimbriae are important for colonization.
