= Bifidus factor =

Biochemistry compound

A bifidus factor (bifidogenic factor) is a compound that specifically enhances the growth of bifidobacteria in either a product or in the intestines of humans and/or animals. Several products have been marketed as bifidogenic factors, such as several prebiotics and methyl-N-acetyl D-glucosamine in human milk.

== Background ==
Originally, fructose-based carbohydrates inulin and fructooligosaccharides, showed a strong selective stimulation of bifidobacteria so a ‘prebiotic effect’ was considered the same as a ‘bifidogenic effect.

== Breast milk ==
Human breast milk contains unique and highly diverse human milk oligosaccharides. These oligosaccharides are considered to be a "Bifidus Factor" because they form highly desired intestinal bacteria; it is for this reason that baby formula contains added oligosaccharides in order to help build a child's immune system. Studies showed that infants who were bottle fed lacked intestinal colonization of bifidobacteria. This lack of bacteria made the babies susceptible to other infectious bacteria and ailments. The infants who were breast fed had higher concentration of the bacteria and their vulnerability to infections was significantly lower. Breast milk had high amounts of oligosaccharides, and so, oligosaccharides were added to milk formula. This method worked and the colonization of bifidobacteria leveled. This suggested that the oligosaccharides found in human milk were candidates for the bifidus factor.

== Composition and function ==
The bifidus factor might be lacto-N-biose I [LNB], which is a derivative of mucin sugars. However, the exact structure and mechanism behind the bifidus factor remains unknown.

The bacteria would break down lactic acid and acetic acid. The environment of the intestine would become acidic, preventing the growth of any harmful pathogens. The function of LBN is unknown and it is possible that oligosaccharides with terminals of Galβ1-3GlcNAc are the bifidus factors.

Bifidobacteria might suppress infections in infants and children.

== Other sources ==
- O'Callaghan, Amy; van Sinderen, Douwe (2016). Bifidobacteria and Their Role as Members of the Human Gut Microbiota. Frontiers in Microbiology, 7, doi:10.3389/fmicb.2016.00925
- Paul György; Robert F. Norris; Catharine S. Rose (1954). Bifidus factor. I. A variant of Lactobacillus bifidus requiring a special growth factor, 48 (1), 193–201. doi:10.1016/0003-9861(54)90323-9
