= Microbial drug delivery =

Form of drug administration

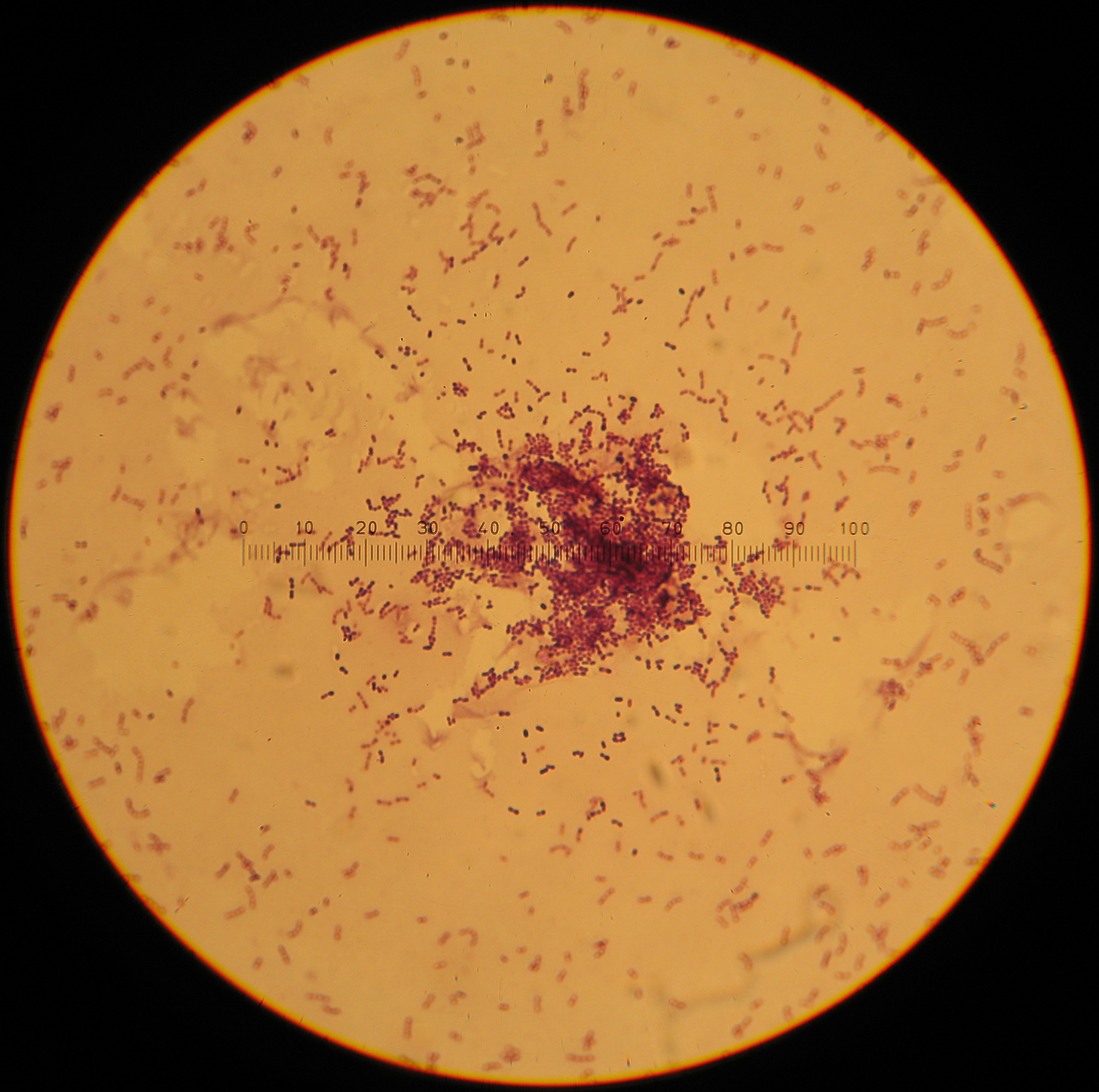
Lactococcus lactis, a species used in microbial drug delivery

Microbial drug delivery is an emerging form of drug administration characterized by the use of commensal microbes that have been genetically modified to produce medications for chronic diseases in humans. Only proteinaceous drugs can be produced by microbes, as DNA encodes for protein. Research into microbial drug delivery refers to this route of administration as topical, since the microbes release the drug directly to the surface of affected tissues, namely the gastrointestinal (GI) epithelium. Microbial drug delivery is not currently used as a standard route of drug administration due to its experimental nature. During clinical trials, it has been used to treat forms of inflammatory bowel disease (IBD). The most prominently studied vehicles of microbial drug administration are the bacterial species, Lactococcus lactis and Bacteroides ovatus.

== Medical usage ==
The usage of recombinant microbes (i.e. microorganisms designed to contain DNA from two or more different species) has applications in treating chronic diseases. In 2006, Braat et al. implemented microbial drug delivery with L. lactis in clinical trials, successfully treating Crohn's disease (CD), a form of IBD that causes inflammation and ulceration in the intestines. In this study, a recombinant strain of L. lactis containing complementary DNA (cDNA) for the human interleukin-10 (IL-10) gene was used to treat CD with IL-10, an anti-inflammatory cytokine. Patients consumed capsules containing the microbe to populate the intestines and received therapeutic doses of IL-10 directly from the recombinant bacteria. As this route of administration is experimental, it is currently not available as a standard treatment option.

In a 2013 animal study with B. ovatus as the vehicle for microbial drug delivery, researcher Zaed Hamady suggested that recombinant strains of B. ovatus containing transforming growth factor-beta (TGF-β) and keratinocyte growth factor-2 (KGF-2) are ready for clinical trials.

== Mechanism of drug administration ==
=== L. lactis mechanism ===
The L. lactis mechanism of microbial drug delivery described in the 2006 study of Braat et al. uses a form of recombinant L. lactis (LL-Thy12) which has replaced the gene, Thy12, with the gene for human IL-10. Removal of Thy12, which encodes for the production of thymidine, causes L. lactis to become dependent on dietary thymidine to maintain live colonies in the gut. The addition of the IL-10 gene allows for the production of human IL-10 to decreases gut inflammation. Secretion of IL-10 from L. lactis in the gut is considered to be a topical administration of the drug to the epithelium, permitting healing in local tissues damaged by inflammation. The administration of IL-10 topically avoids systemic effects, such as immunosuppression in non-target tissues. When using LL-Thy12, IL-10 secretion is dependent on the quantity of live LL-Thy12 in the GI tract. As the presence of dietary thymidine increases the quantity of LL-Thy12, the drug production increases proportionately. Reductions in dietary thymidine kill LL-Thy12, decreasing the production of IL-10. There is a delay of approximately 72-hours between a change in thymidine dosage and the production of IL-10. Due to LL-Thy12’s dependence on thymidine, they will die upon exiting the body through defecation.

=== B. ovatus mechanism ===
B. ovatus has been used in animal studies as a mode of microbial drug delivery due to its xylanase operon. Operons exist in bacteria to control gene expression and are composed of a DNA sequence containing an operator followed by the genes of interest. The operator in the xylanase operon prevents transcription of genes when bound to a repressor protein. The B. ovatus xylanase operon only functions in the presence of the starch, xylan, which removes the repressor and enables production of whichever proteins correlate with the genes located after the operator. For microbial drug delivery, the genes after the operator include those inserted as part of the genetic modification. Xylan is non-digestible to human gastric acid or digestive enzymes, so a predictable quantity of dietary xylan will reach the recombinant B. ovatus in the gut, hypothetically allowing for a precise quantity of drug to be produced by the recombinant B. ovatus. In mice, recombinant B. ovatus strains containing genes for growth factors TGF-β and KGF-2 within the xylanase operon have successfully treated ulcerative colitis (UC). The secreted drugs from B. ovatus are applied topically to the epithelial lining, affecting local tissues rather than acting systemically. Systemic administration of these growth factors could otherwise cause tumors and increased vascularization of tissues. When administered microbially, TGF-β and KGF-2 facilitate tissue repair only in the colon where they are released.

== Safety of microbial drug delivery ==
Safety is a major factor in the efficacy of microbial drug delivery. Depending on the type of drug being administered, a certain level of control is required for effective and safe treatment of colonic diseases. The L. lactis system has a 72-hour delay between ingesting thymidine and activating IL-10 production, while the B. ovatus system allows the drug to be produced once xylan reaches the bacteria. Regarding IL-10 secretions in L. lactis, the delay is acceptable for treatment of IBD, however any drug that requires a precise dosage and timing may necessitate B. ovatus for controlling drug output.

The safety of microbial drug delivery is tied to the microbes’ commensal capability and instance of pathogenesis. A highly pathogenic microbe would not be suitable for medical treatment due to an inherent infection risk. L. lactis is considered by the Food and Drug Administration (FDA) to be generally recognized as safe (GRAS), as it is commonly found in widely consumed dairy products, suggesting its safety in medical treatment. B. ovatus is naturally found in 10% of healthy human colons, demonstrating safety in its compatibility with the human gut microbiota; however, Bacteroides species are known in some cases to cause infections, typically resulting from surgery in the GI tract.

Concerns regarding the containment of recombinant microbes in the gut have been addressed through safety mechanisms in both L. lactis and B. ovatus. Containment refers to the inability of microbes to colonize the external environment, where they may have unknown consequences. LL-Thy12 will die upon removal from the body, as they depend on dietary thymidine for survival. B. ovatus is naturally an obligate anaerobe, so any recombinant strain is expected to die in the presence of oxygen once removed from the body.

== See also ==
- Gut flora
- Oral administration
- Mucous membrane
- Absorption (pharmacokinetics)
- List of human flora
- List of microorganisms used in food and beverage preparation
