= Lucille K. Georg =

Mycologist (died 1980)

Lucille K. Georg (died June 17, 1980) was the second mycologist hired by U.S. Centers for Disease Control and Prevention's Libero Ajello in 1947-48. She was a prolific and pioneering investigator of fungal diseases. In 1982, the International Society for Human & Animal Mycology (ISHAM) established the Lucille Georg Award in her honor. A memoriam about her life and accomplishments was published by Mycoses. To this day, a great many of the best quality images of fungal pathogens were contributed by Georg.
