= Antibiotic-associated diarrhea =

Antibiotic-associated diarrhea (AAD) results from an imbalance in the colonic microbiota caused by antibiotics. Microbiotal alteration changes carbohydrate metabolism with decreased short-chain fatty acid absorption and an osmotic diarrhea as a result. Another consequence of antibiotic therapy leading to diarrhea is an overgrowth of potentially pathogenic organisms such as Clostridioides difficile. It is defined as frequent loose and watery stools with no other complications. Antibiotic-associated diarrhea occurs in an estimated 5–35% of people exposed to antibiotics, with its frequency varying according to the class of antibiotic, the health of the patient, and exposure to pathogens.

== Cause ==
Clostridioides difficile, also known more commonly as C. diff, accounts for 10 to 20% of antibiotic-associated diarrhea cases, because the antibiotics administered for the treatment of certain disease processes such as inflammatory colitis also inadvertently kill a large portion of the gut flora, the normal flora that is usually present within the bowel. With this lower level of "healthy" bacteria present, the overgrowth of C. diff is then responsible "for elaborating the enterotoxin".

== Treatment ==
Meta-analyses have concluded that probiotics may protect against antibiotic-associated diarrhea in both children and adults. Evidence is insufficient, however, regarding an effect on rates of C. difficile colitis.

The efficacy of probiotic AAD prevention is dependent on the probiotic strain(s) used and on the dosage. Up to a 50% reduction of AAD occurrences has been found.
