= Scardovia =

Scientific classification
- Domain: Bacteria
- Kingdom: Bacillati
- Phylum: Actinomycetota
- Class: Actinomycetes
- Order: Bifidobacteriales
- Family: Bifidobacteriaceae
- Genus: Scardovia; Jian and Dong 2002

Type species
- Scardovia inopinata (Crociani et al. 1996) Jian and Dong 2002

Species
- S. inopinata (Crociani et al. 1996) Jian and Dong 2002; S. wiggsiae Downes et al. 2011

Genus of bacteria

Scardovia is a genus of bacteria in the family Bifidobacteriaceae that is associated with dental caries. The species of this genera are acidogenic and acid-tolerant.

Scardovia species are associated with white spot lesion development on the teeth after placement of fixed orthodontic appliances. The Scardovia wiggsiae is one of two caries-associated species implicated in severe-early childhood caries (along with Streptococcus mutans).
