= Fructose-6-phosphate phosphoketolase =

fructose-6-phosphate phosphoketolase

Identifiers
- EC no.: 4.1.2.22
- CAS no.: 37290-57-6

Databases
- IntEnz: IntEnz view
- BRENDA: BRENDA entry
- ExPASy: NiceZyme view
- KEGG: KEGG entry
- MetaCyc: metabolic pathway
- PRIAM: profile
- PDB structures: RCSB PDB PDBe PDBsum
- Gene Ontology: AmiGO / QuickGO
Search
- PMC: articles
- PubMed: articles
- NCBI: proteins

The enzyme fructose-6-phosphate phosphoketolase (EC 4.1.2.22) catalyzes the chemical reaction

D-fructose 6-phosphate + phosphate $\rightleftharpoons$ acetyl phosphate + D-erythrose 4-phosphate + H_{2}O

This enzyme belongs to the family of lyases, specifically the aldehyde-lyases, which cleave carbon-carbon bonds. The systematic name of this enzyme class is D-fructose-6-phosphate D-erythrose-4-phosphate-lyase (adding phosphate; acetyl-phosphate-forming). Other names in common use include D-fructose-6-phosphate D-erythrose-4-phosphate-lyase, and (phosphate-acetylating). This enzyme participates in pentose phosphate pathway.
