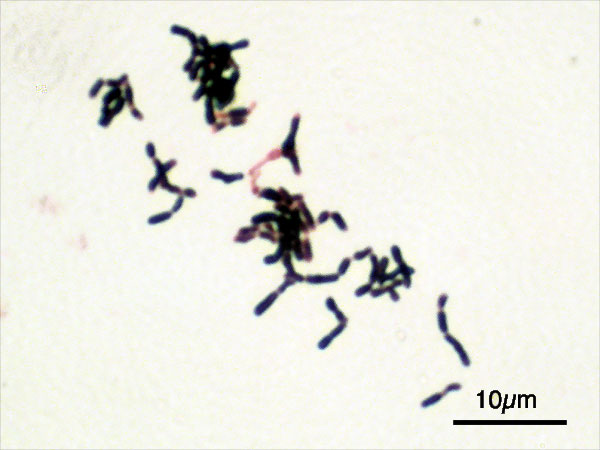
- Bifidobacterium adolescentis

Scientific classification
- Domain: Bacteria
- Kingdom: Bacillati
- Phylum: Actinomycetota
- Class: Actinomycetes
- Order: Bifidobacteriales
- Family: Bifidobacteriaceae
- Genus: Bifidobacterium; Orla-Jensen 1924 (Approved Lists 1980)

Type species
- Bifidobacterium bifidum (Tissier 1900) Orla-Jensen 1924 (Approved Lists 1980)

Species
- See text.

= Bifidobacterium =

Genus of bacteria

Bifidobacterium is a genus of gram-positive, nonmotile, often branched anaerobic bacteria. They are ubiquitous inhabitants of the gastrointestinal tract though strains have been isolated from the vagina and mouth (B. dentium) of mammals, including humans. Bifidobacteria are one of the major genera of bacteria that make up the gastrointestinal tract microbiota in mammals. Some bifidobacteria are used as probiotics.

Before the 1960s, Bifidobacterium species were collectively referred to as Lactobacillus bifidus.

== Mode of action ==
Underlying most of the beneficial effects of Bifidobacterium are improved immune system function and reduction in inflammation. Notably, Bifidobacterium increases regulatory T cells and improves the intestinal barrier. Bifidobacterium produces essential metabolites for use by other key bacteria. Bifidobacterium carbohydrate fermentation produces acetate and butyrate, which can protect against various diseases.

== History ==
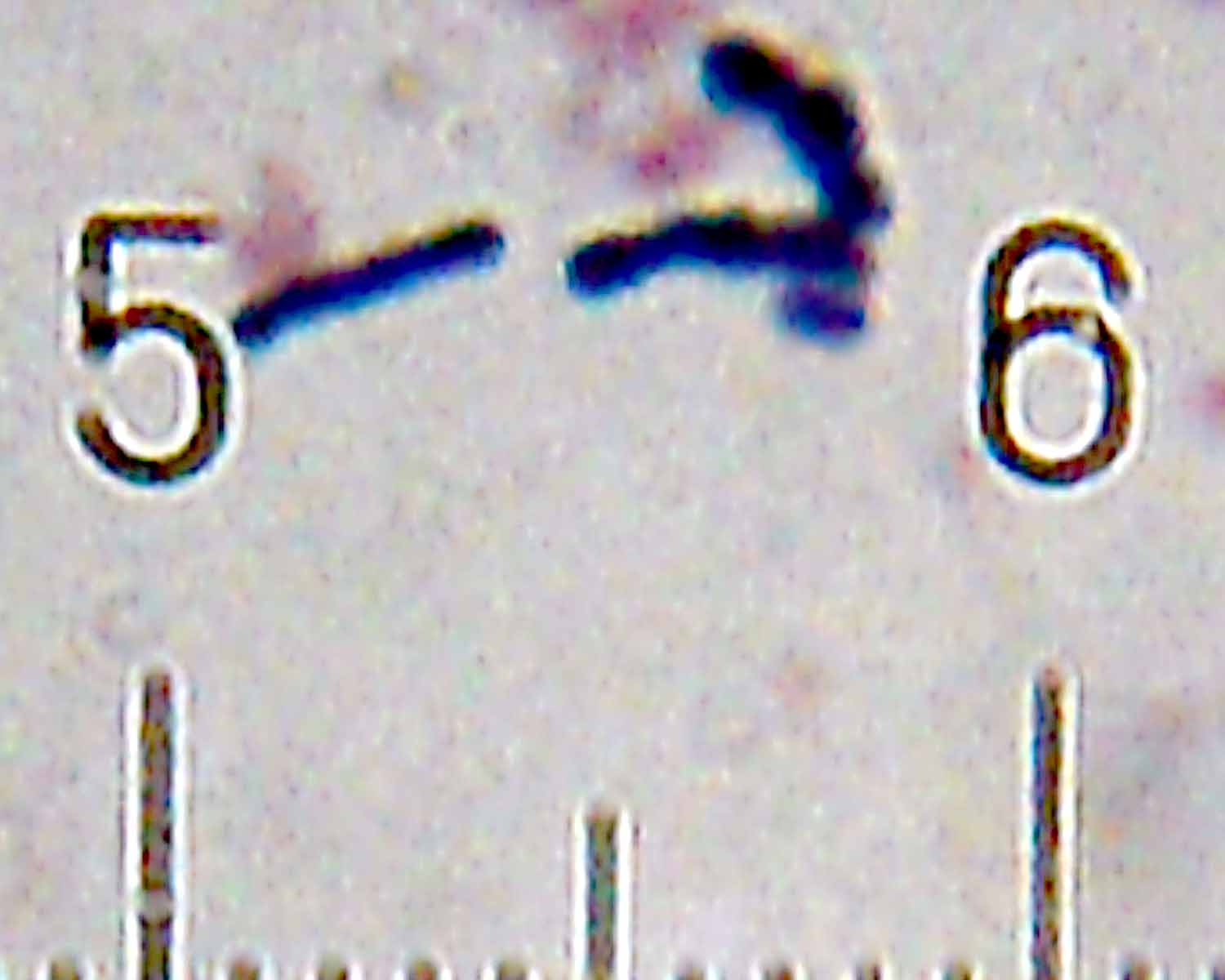
Some of the Bifidobacterium animalis bacteria found in a sample of Activia yogurt: The numbered ticks on the scale are 10 micrometres apart.

In 1899, Henri Tissier, a French pediatrician at the Pasteur Institute in Paris, isolated a bacterium characterised by a Y-shaped morphology ("bifid") in the intestinal microbiota of breast-fed infants and named it "bifidus". In 1907, Élie Metchnikoff, deputy director at the Pasteur Institute, propounded the theory that lactic acid bacteria are beneficial to human health. Metchnikoff observed that the longevity of Bulgarians was the result of their consumption of fermented milk products. Metchnikoff also suggested that "oral administration of cultures of fermentative bacteria would implant the beneficial bacteria in the intestinal tract".

== Metabolism ==
The genus Bifidobacterium possesses a unique fructose-6-phosphate phosphoketolase pathway employed to ferment carbohydrates.

Much metabolic research on bifidobacteria has focused on oligosaccharide metabolism, as these carbohydrates are available in their otherwise nutrient-limited habitats. Infant-associated bifidobacterial phylotypes appear to have evolved the ability to ferment milk oligosaccharides, whereas adult-associated species use plant oligosaccharides, consistent with what they encounter in their respective environments. As breast-fed infants often harbor bifidobacteria-dominated gut consortia, numerous applications attempt to mimic the bifidogenic properties of milk oligosaccharides. These are broadly classified as plant-derived fructooligosaccharides or dairy-derived galactooligosaccharides, which are differentially metabolized and distinct from milk oligosaccharide catabolism.

== Response to oxygen ==
The sensitivity of members of the genus Bifidobacterium to O_{2} generally limits probiotic activity to anaerobic habitats. Recent research has reported that some Bifidobacterium strains exhibit various types of oxic growth. Low concentrations of O_{2} and CO_{2} can have a stimulatory effect on the growth of these Bifidobacterium strains. Based on the growth profiles under different O_{2} concentrations, the Bifidobacterium species were classified into four classes: O_{2}-hypersensitive, O_{2}-sensitive, O_{2}-tolerant, and microaerophilic. The primary factor responsible for aerobic growth inhibition is proposed to be the production of hydrogen peroxide (H_{2}O_{2}) in the growth medium. A H_{2}O_{2}-forming NADH oxidase was purified from O_{2}-sensitive Bifidobacterium bifidum and was identified as a b-type dihydroorotate dehydrogenase. The kinetic parameters suggested that the enzyme could be involved in H_{2}O_{2} production in highly aerated environments.

== Genomes ==
Members of the genus Bifidobacterium have genome sizes ranging from 1.73 (Bifidobacterium indicum) to 3.25 Mb (Bifidobacterium biavatii), corresponding to 1,352 and 2,557 predicted protein-encoding open reading frames, respectively.

Functional classification of Bifidobacterium genes, including the pan-genome of this genus, revealed that 13.7% of the identified bifidobacterial genes encode enzymes involved in carbohydrate metabolism.

== Clinical uses ==
Adding Bifidobacterium as a probiotic to conventional treatment of ulcerative colitis has been shown to be associated with improved rates of remission and improved maintenance of remission. Some Bifidobacterium strains are considered as important probiotics and used in the food industry. Different species or strains of bifidobacteria may exert a range of beneficial health effects, including the regulation of intestinal microbial homeostasis, the inhibition of pathogens and harmful bacteria that colonize or infect the gut mucosa, the modulation of local and systemic immune responses, the repression of procarcinogenic enzymatic activities within the microbiota, the production of vitamins, and the bioconversion of a number of dietary compounds into bioactive molecules. Bifidobacteria improve the gut mucosal barrier and lower levels of lipopolysaccharide in the intestine.

Bifidobacteria may also improve abdominal pain in patients with irritable bowel syndrome (IBS) though studies to date have been inconclusive.

Naturally occurring Bifidobacterium spp. may discourage the growth of Gram-negative pathogens in infants.

A mother's milk contains high concentrations of lactose and lower quantities of phosphate (pH buffer). Therefore, when mother's milk is fermented by lactic acid bacteria (including bifidobacteria) in the infant's gastrointestinal tract, the pH may be reduced, making it more difficult for Gram-negative bacteria to grow.

== Bifidobacteria and the infant gut ==
The human infant gut is relatively sterile up until birth, where it takes up bacteria from its surrounding environment and its mother. The microbiota that makes up the infant gut differs from the adult gut. An infant reaches the adult stage of their microbiome at around three years of age, when their microbiome diversity increases, stabilizes, and the infant switches over to solid foods. Breast-fed infants are colonized earlier by Bifidobacterium when compared to babies that are primarily formula-fed. Bifidobacterium is the most common bacteria in the infant gut microbiome. There is more variability in genotypes over time in infants, making them less stable compared to the adult Bifidobacterium. Infants and children under three years old show low diversity in microbiome bacteria, but more diversity between individuals when compared to adults. Reduction of Bifidobacterium and increase in diversity of the infant gut microbiome occurs with less breast-milk intake and increase of solid food intake. Mammalian milk all contain oligosaccharides showing natural selection. Human milk oligosaccharides are not digested by enzymes and remain whole through the digestive tract before being broken down in the colon by microbiota. Bifidobacterium species genomes of B. longum, B. bifidum, B. breve contain genes that can hydrolyze some of the human milk oligosaccharides and these are found in higher numbers in infants that are breast-fed. Glycans that are produced by the humans are converted into food and energy for the B. bifidum. showing an example of coevolution.

== Species ==
The genus Bifidobacterium comprises the following species:

Bombiscardovia Group (all cultured from the hindgut of bees)

- B. actinocoloniiforme Killer et al. 2011
- B. apousia Chen et al. 2022
- B. asteroides Scardovi and Trovatelli 1969 (Approved Lists 1980)
- B. choladohabitans Chen et al. 2022
- B. indicum Scardovi and Trovatelli 1969 (Approved Lists 1980)
- B. polysaccharolyticum Chen et al. 2022
- B. xylocopae Alberoni et al. 2019

Bifidobacterium adolescentis Group

- B. adolescentis Reuter 1963 (Approved Lists 1980)
- B. catenulatum Scardovi and Crociani 1974 (Approved Lists 1980)
- B. dentium Scardovi and Crociani 1974 (Approved Lists 1980)
- B. moukalabense Tsuchida et al. 2014
- B. pseudocatenulatum Scardovi et al. 1979 (Approved Lists 1980)
- B. ruminantium Biavati and Mattarelli 1991

Bifidobacterium bifidium Group

- B. aerophilum Michelini et al. 2017
- B. amazonense Lugli et al. 2021
- B. biavatii Endo et al. 2012
- B. bifidum (Tissier 1900) Orla-Jensen 1924 (Approved Lists 1980)
- B. goeldii Duranti et al. 2019
- B. hapali Michelini et al. 2016
- B. jacchi Modesto et al. 2019
- B. leontopitheci Duranti et al. 2020
- B. ramosum Michelini et al. 2017
- B. samirii Duranti et al. 2019
- B. scardovii Hoyles et al. 2002

Bifidobacterium bombi Group (Milk and Honey)

- B. aemilianum Alberoni et al. 2019
- B. bohemicum Killer et al. 2011
- B. bombi Killer et al. 2009
- B. commune Praet et al. 2015
- B. minimum Biavati et al. 1982
- B. mongoliense Watanabe et al. 2009
- B. subtile Biavati et al. 1982
- B. tibiigranuli Eckel et al. 2020

Bifidobacterium boum Group

- B. apri Pechar et al. 2017
- B. boum Scardovi et al. 1979 (Approved Lists 1980)
- B. porcinum (Zhu et al. 2003) Nouioui et al. 2018
- B. thermacidophilum Dong et al. 2000
- B. thermophilum corrig. Mitsuoka 1969 (Approved Lists 1980)

Bifidobacterium longum Group

- B. aesculapii Modesto et al. 2014
- B. angulatum Scardovi and Crociani 1974 (Approved Lists 1980)
- B. avesanii Michelini et al. 2019
- B. breve Reuter 1963 (Approved Lists 1980)
- B. callitrichidarum Modesto et al. 2018
- B. callitrichos Endo et al. 2012
- B. cebidarum Duranti et al. 2020
- B. colobi Lugli et al. 2021
- B. erythrocebi Neuzil-Bunesova et al. 2021
- B. eulemuris Michelini et al. 2016
- B. felsineum Modesto et al. 2020
- B. lemurum Modesto et al. 2015
- B. longum Reuter 1963 (Approved Lists 1980)
- B. merycicum Biavati and Mattarelli 1991
- B. miconisargentati Lugli et al. 2021
- B. moraviense Neuzil-Bunesova et al. 2021
- B. myosotis Michelini et al. 2016
- B. oedipodis Neuzil-Bunesova et al. 2021
- B. olomucense Neuzil-Bunesova et al. 2021
- B. panos Neuzil-Bunesova et al. 2021
- B. parmae Lugli et al. 2018
- "B. platyrrhinorum" Modesto et al. 2020
- B. pongonis Lugli et al. 2021
- B. reuteri Endo et al. 2012
- B. rousetti Modesto et al. 2021
- B. saguini Endo et al. 2012
- B. saguinibicoloris Lugli et al. 2021
- B. santillanense Lugli et al. 2021
- B. scaligerum Modesto et al. 2020
- B. simiiventris Lugli et al. 2021
- B. stellenboschense Endo et al. 2012
- B. vespertilionis Modesto et al. 2021

Bifidobacterium pullorum Group (from birds and rabbits)

- B. pullorum Trovatelli et al. 1974 (Approved Lists 1980)
- "Bifidobacterium phasiani"

Bifidobacterium pseudolongum Group

- B. animalis (Mitsuoka 1969) Scardovi and Trovatelli 1974 (Approved Lists 1980)
- B. anseris Lugli et al. 2018
- B. canis Neuzil-Bunesova et al. 2020
- B. castoris Duranti et al. 2019
- B. choerinum Scardovi et al. 1979 (Approved Lists 1980)
- B. choloepi Modesto et al. 2020
- B. criceti Lugli et al. 2018
- B. cuniculi Scardovi et al. 1979 (Approved Lists 1980)
- B. dolichotidis Duranti et al. 2019
- B. gallicum Lauer 1990
- B. globosum (Scardovi et al. 1969) Biavati et al. 1982
- B. italicum Lugli et al. 2018
- B. magnum Scardovi and Zani 1974 (Approved Lists 1980)
- B. miconis Lugli et al. 2021
- B. pseudolongum Mitsuoka 1969 (Approved Lists 1980)

Bifidobacterium psychroarophilum Group

- B. aquikefiri Laureys et al. 2016
- "B. crudilactis" Delcenserie et al. 2007
- B. psychraerophilum Simpson et al. 2004

Bifidobacterium tissieri Group (from primates)

- B. callimiconis Duranti et al. 2019
- B. catulorum Modesto et al. 2018
- B.margollesii Lugli et al. 2018
- B. pluvialisilvae Lugli et al. 2021
- B. primatium Modesto et al. 2020
- "B. saimiriisciurei" Modesto et al. 2020
- B. simiarum Modesto et al. 2020
- B. tissieri corrig. Michelini et al. 2016
- B. vansinderenii Duranti et al. 2017

Ungrouped Bifidobacterium

- B. imperatoris Lugli et al. 2018
- B. tsurumiense Okamoto et al. 2008

== See also ==
- List of bacterial vaginosis microbiota
- Probiotic
- Proteobiotics
- Prebiotics
