= Probiotic =

Microorganism consumed in food

Probiotics are live microorganisms that are intended to support or improve the health and wellbeing of a host organism. They are commonly used in both humans and animals. Although the term refers to the microorganisms themselves, probiotics can be consumed through a range of products including yogurt, cheese, certain fermented foods (such as nattō), as well as capsules containing a single strain or a defined mixture of strains.

Probiotics are regarded as generally recognized as safe (GRAS) by the U.S. Food and Drug Administration (FDA), which supports their safety when used as intended, although this designation does not establish their effectiveness or specific health benefits. Many claimed health benefits, such as treating eczema or curing vaginal infections, lack substantial scientific support.

The first discovered probiotic was a certain strain of bacillus in Bulgarian yoghurt, called Lactobacillus bulgaricus. The discovery was made in 1905 by Bulgarian physician and microbiologist Stamen Grigorov. The modern-day theory is generally attributed to Russian Nobel Prize laureate Élie Metchnikoff, who postulated around 1907 that yoghurt-consuming Bulgarian peasants lived longer.

A growing probiotics market has led to the need for stricter requirements for scientific substantiation of putative benefits conferred by microorganisms claimed to be probiotic. Although some evidence claimed benefits are marketed towards using probiotic, such as reducing gastrointestinal discomfort, improving immune health, relieving constipation, or avoiding the common cold, such claims are strain-specific and cannot be extrapolated to other strains. As of 2019, numerous applications for approval of health claims by European manufacturers of probiotic dietary supplements have been rejected by the European Food Safety Authority for insufficient evidence of beneficial mechanism or efficacy.

== Definition ==
An October 2001 report by the World Health Organization (WHO) defines probiotics as "live microorganisms which when administered in adequate amounts confer a health benefit on the host." Following this definition, a working group convened by the Food and Agriculture Organization (FAO)/WHO in May 2002 issued the Guidelines for the Evaluation of Probiotics in Food. A consensus definition of the term probiotics, based on available information and scientific evidence, was adopted after the aforementioned joint expert consultation between the FAO of the United Nations and the WHO. This effort was accompanied by local governmental and supra-governmental regulatory bodies' requirements to better characterize health claims substantiations.

That first global effort was further developed in 2010; two expert groups of academic scientists and industry representatives made recommendations for the evaluation and validation of probiotic health claims. The same principles emerged from those two groups as were expressed in the "Guidelines" of FAO/WHO in 2002. This definition, though widely adopted, is not acceptable to the European Food Safety Authority because it embeds a health claim that is not measurable.

A group of scientific experts assembled in Canada in October 2013 to discuss the scope and appropriate use of the term "probiotic", adjusting the definition to be "live microorganisms that, when administered in adequate amounts, confer a health benefit on the host."

== In food ==
Live probiotic cultures are part of fermented dairy products, other fermented foods, and probiotic-fortified foods.

Lactic acid bacteria, which are food-fermenting bacteria, have the ability to prevent food spoilage and can improve the nutritive value of the foods they inhabit. Acid fermentation (as well as salting), remains one of the most practical methods of preservation of fresh vegetables, cereal gruels, and milk-cereal mixtures due to its low cost and energy requirements.

Fermented products that contain lactic acid bacteria include vegetables such as pickled vegetables, kimchi, pao cai, and sauerkraut; sourdough bread or bread-like products made without wheat or rye flour, amino acid/peptide meat-flavored sauces and pastes produced by fermentation of cereals and legumes; fermented cereal-fish-shrimp mixtures and fermented meats; soy products such as tempeh, miso, and soy sauce; dairy products such as yogurt, kefir, buttermilk; and non-dairy products such as bee pollen.

More precisely, sauerkraut contains the bacteria Leuconostoc mesenteroides, Lactobacillus plantarum, Pediococcus pentosaceus, Lactobacillus brevis, Leuconostoc citreum, Leuconostoc argentinum, Lactobacillus paraplantarum, Lactobacillus coryniformis, and Weissella spp. Kimchi contains the bacteria Leuconostoc spp., Weissella spp., and Lactobacillus spp. Pao cai contains L. pentosus, L. plantarum , Leuconostoc mesenteroides , L. brevis, L. lactis, and L. fermentum. Kefir contains Lactobacillus acidophilus, Bifidobacterium bifidum, Streptococcus thermophilus, Lactobacillus delbrueckii subsp. bulgaricus, Lactobacillus helveticus, Lactobacillus kefiranofaciens, Lactococcus lactis, and Leuconostoc species. Buttermilk contains either Lactococcus lactis or L. bulgaricus. Other acidic bacteria, said to be probiotic, can be found in kombucha, including Gluconacetobacter xylinus, Zygosaccharomyces sp., Acetobacter pasteurianus, Acetobacter aceti, and Gluconobacter oxydans.

== Dosage ==
Probiotics are measured in colony forming units (CFU), which indicates the number of viable microorganisms in a product. The effective dose depends on the intended use with typical amounts ranging from 1 - 10 billion CFU/dose.

== Side effects ==
The manipulation of the gut microbiota is complex and may cause bacteria-host interactions. Though probiotics are considered safe, some have concerns about their safety in certain cases. Some people, such as those with immunodeficiency, short bowel syndrome, central venous catheters, and cardiac valve disease, and premature infants, may be at higher risk for adverse events. In severely ill people with inflammatory bowel disease, a risk exists for the passage of viable bacteria from the gastrointestinal tract to the internal organs (bacterial translocation) as a consequence of bacteremia, which can cause adverse health consequences. Rarely, consumption of probiotics by children with lowered immune system function or who are already critically ill may result in bacteremia or fungemia (i.e., bacteria or fungi in the blood), which can lead to sepsis, a potentially fatal disease.

Probiotic supplements typically contain between one and ten billion colony-forming units per dose. A higher number of CFUs does not provide additional probiotic effects, but may have unintended consequences of causing digestive discomfort, such as bloating, gas, and diarrhea.

Lactobacillus species have been suggested to contribute to obesity in humans, but no evidence of this relationship has been found.

== Consumption ==
In 2015, the global retail market value for probiotics was US$41 billion, including sales of probiotic supplements, fermented milk products, and yogurt, which alone accounted for 75% of total consumption. Innovation in probiotic products in 2015 was mainly from supplements, which produced US$4 billion and was projected to grow 37% globally by 2020. Consumption of yogurt products in China has increased by 20% per year since 2014.

== Regulation ==
As of 2019, the European Food Safety Authority has rejected all petitions by commercial manufacturers for health claims on probiotic products in Europe due to insufficient evidence for a cause-and-effect mechanism for benefit, thus inconclusive proof of effectiveness. The European Commission placed a ban on putting the word "probiotic" on the packaging of products because such labeling misleads consumers to believe a health benefit is provided by the product when no scientific proof exists to demonstrate that health effect.

For food labeling in Canada, the federal government requires product labels using the term "probiotic" to have a government-approved health claim about the live specific microorganism(s) contained in the food.

In the United States, the Food and Drug Administration (FDA) and Federal Trade Commission (FTC) have issued warning letters and imposed punishment on various manufacturers of probiotic products whose labels claim to treat a disease or condition. Food product labeling requires language approved by the FDA, so probiotic manufacturers have received warning letters for making disease or treatment claims. The FTC has taken punitive actions, including a US$21 million fine coordinated by 39 different state governments against a major probiotic manufacturer for deceptive advertising and exaggerated claims of health benefits for yogurt and a probiotic dairy drink.

In Vietnam, the Vietnam Food Administration (VFA) under the Ministry of Health, in collaboration with other relevant authorities, oversees and addresses violations related to probiotic products. This includes issuing warnings, imposing administrative penalties, demanding product recalls and coordinating with other agencies.

=== Yogurt labeling ===
The National Yogurt Association (NYA) of the United States gives a "Live & Active Cultures Seal" to refrigerated yogurt products that contain 100 million cells per gram, or frozen yogurt products that contain 10 million cells per gram at the time of manufacture. In 2002, the FDA and WHO recommended that "the minimum viable numbers of each probiotic strain at the end of the shelf-life" be reported on labeling, but most companies that give a number report the viable cell count at the date of manufacture, a number that could be much higher than that which exists at consumption. Because of the variability in storage conditions and time before eating, exactly how many active culture cells remain at the time of consumption is difficult to determine. The survival of probiotics was strongly dependent on the storage temperature and remarkable viability loss occurred in room temperature compared to refrigerated storage.

== History ==
Probiotics have received renewed attention in the 21st century from product manufacturers, research studies, and consumers. The history of probiotics dates back to ancient times, with the consumption of fermented foods being a common practice across various civilizations. Different types of fermented milk products were invented in different generations, such as Kefir in 5000 BC and Yeast usage in 5000 BC. Their history can be traced to the first use of cheese and fermented products, which were well-known to the Greeks and Romans who recommended their consumption. The fermentation of dairy foods represents one of the oldest techniques for food preservation.

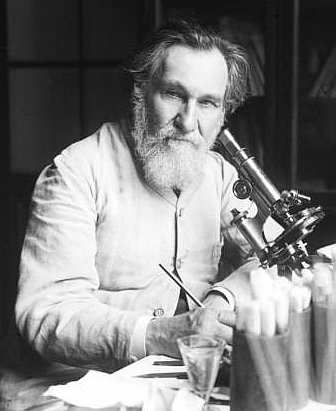
Élie Metchnikoff first suggested the possibility of colonizing the gut with beneficial bacteria in the early 20th century.

The original modern hypothesis of the positive role played by certain bacteria was first introduced by Russian scientist and Nobel Prize laureate Élie Metchnikoff, who in 1907 suggested that it would be possible to modify the gut microbiota and to replace harmful microbes with useful microbes. Metchnikoff proposed that consumption of fermented milk would "seed" the intestine with harmless lactic-acid bacteria and decrease the intestinal pH, and that this would suppress the growth of proteolytic bacteria.

Bifidobacteria was first isolated from a breastfed infant by Henry Tissier, who also worked at the Pasteur Institute. The isolated bacterium named Bacillus bifidus communis was later renamed to the genus Bifidobacterium. Tissier found that bifidobacteria are dominant in the gut microbiota of breast-fed babies and he observed clinical benefits from treating infant diarrhea with bifidobacteria.

During an outbreak of shigellosis in 1917, German professor Alfred Nissle isolated a strain of Escherichia coli from the feces of a soldier who was not affected by the disease. Methods of treating infectious diseases were needed at that time when antibiotics were not yet available, and Nissle used the E. coli Nissle 1917 strain in acute gastrointestinal infectious salmonellosis and shigellosis.

In 1920, Rettger and Cheplin reported that Metchnikoff's "Bulgarian Bacillus", later called Lactobacillus delbrueckii subsp. bulgaricus, could not live in the human intestine. They conducted experiments involving rats and humans volunteers, feeding them with Lactobacillus acidophilus. They observed the disappearance of the pathogenic protist Balantidium coli as well as of other gas-producing bacteria. Rettger further explored the possibilities of L. acidophilus, and reasoned that bacteria originating from the gut were more likely to produce the desired effect in this environment. In 1935, certain strains of L. acidophilus were found very active when implanted in the human digestive tract.

Contrasting antibiotics, probiotics were defined as microbially derived factors that stimulate the growth of other microorganisms. In 1989, Roy Fuller suggested a definition of probiotics that have been widely used: "A live microbial feed supplement which beneficially affects the host animal by improving its intestinal microbial balance." Fuller's definition emphasizes the requirement of viability for probiotics and introduces the aspect of a beneficial effect on the host.

The term "probiotic" originally referred to microorganisms that have effects on other microorganisms. The concept of probiotics involved the notion that substances secreted by one microorganism stimulated the growth of another microorganism. The term was used again to describe tissue extracts that stimulated microbial growth. The term probiotics was taken up by Parker, who defined the concept as, "Organisms and substances that have a beneficial effect on the host animal by contributing to its intestinal microbial balance." Later, the definition was improved by Fuller, whose explanation was similar to the Fuller description of probiotics as a "live microbial feed supplement which beneficially affects the host animal by improving its intestinal microbial balance." He stressed two important claims for probiotics: the viable nature of probiotics and the capacity to help with intestinal balance.

In the following decades, intestinal lactic-acid bacterial species with alleged health-beneficial properties were introduced as probiotics, including Lactobacillus rhamnosus, Lactobacillus casei, and Lactobacillus johnsonii.

=== Etymology ===
Some literature gives the word a Greek etymology, but it appears to be a composite of the Latin preposition pro, meaning 'for', and the Greek adjective βιωτικός (biōtikos), meaning 'fit for life, lively', the latter deriving from the noun βίος (bios), meaning 'life'.

== Research ==
As food products or dietary supplements, probiotics are under preliminary research to evaluate if they provide any effect on health. In all cases proposed as health claims to the European Food Safety Authority, the scientific evidence remains insufficient to prove a cause-and-effect relationship between consumption of probiotic products and any health benefit. There is no scientific basis for extrapolating an effect from a tested strain to an untested strain. Improved health through gut flora modulation appears to be directly related to long-term dietary changes. Claims that some lactobacilli may contribute to weight gain in some humans remain controversial.

=== Acute otitis media ===
There is inconsistency in the results of different groups of 3488 children as reported in a Cochrane review. Also, it shows no significant difference regarding the adverse effects between probiotic and the other comparators.

=== Allergies ===
Only limited, low-quality evidence exists to indicate that probiotics are helpful for treating people with milk allergy. A 2015 review showed low-quality evidence that probiotics given directly to infants with eczema, or in infants whose mothers used probiotics during the last trimester of pregnancy and breastfeeding, had lower risk of eczema.

=== Asthma ===
It is unclear whether probiotic supplementation helps with childhood asthma, as the quality of research evidence is low.

=== Antibiotic-associated diarrhea ===
Antibiotics are a common treatment for children, with 11% to 40% of antibiotic-treated children developing diarrhea. Antibiotic-associated diarrhea (AAD) results from an imbalance in the colonic microbiota caused by antibiotic therapy. These microbial community alterations result in changes in carbohydrate metabolism, with decreased short-chain fatty acid absorption and osmotic diarrhea as a result. A 2015 Cochrane review concluded that a protective effect of some probiotics existed for AAD in children. The known risks of using probiotics for treating Clostridioides difficile outweigh the uncertain benefits.

Probiotic treatment might reduce the incidence and severity of AAD as indicated in several meta-analyses. For example, treatment with probiotic formulations including L. rhamnosus may reduce the risk of AAD, improve stool consistency during antibiotic therapy, and enhance the immune response after vaccination.

The potential efficacy of probiotics to treat AAD depends on the probiotic strains and dosage. One review recommended for children L. rhamnosus or Saccharomyces boulardii at 5 to 40 billion colony-forming units/day, given the modest number needed to treat and the likelihood that adverse events are very rare. The same review stated that probiotic use should be avoided in pediatric populations at risk for adverse events, such as severely debilitated or immune-compromised children.

=== Bacterial vaginosis ===
Probiotic treatment of bacterial vaginosis is the application of bacterial species found in the healthy vagina to outcompete bacteria present causing bacterial vaginosis. This treatment is based on the observation that 70% of healthy females have a group of bacteria in the genus Lactobacillus that dominate the population of organisms in the vagina. Specific strains of lactobacilli inhibit the growth of bacteria causing BV by producing H_{2}O_{2}, lactic acid, and/or bacteriocins, and/or inhibit the adherence of Gardnerella vaginalis to the vaginal epithelium, which prevents the infection from occurring in the vagina. Currently, the success of probiotic treatment has been mixed, since the use of probiotics to restore healthy populations of Lactobacillus has not been standardized. Often, standard antibiotic treatment is used at the same time that probiotics are being tested. In addition, some groups of women respond to treatment based upon ethnicity, age, number of sexual partners, pregnancy, and the pathogens causing bacterial vaginosis. In 2013, researchers found that administration of hydrogen peroxide-producing strains, such as L. acidophilus and L. rhamnosus, were able to normalize vaginal pH and rebalance the vaginal microbiota, preventing and alleviating bacterial vaginosis.

=== Blood pressure ===
As of 2017, only limited evidence indicated any direct link between high blood pressure and gut microbiota.

=== Cholesterol ===
A 2002 meta-analysis that included five double-blind trials examining the short-term (2–8 weeks) effects of a yogurt with probiotic strains on serum cholesterol levels found little effect of 8.5 mg/dL (0.22 mmol/L) (4% decrease) in total cholesterol concentration, and a decrease of 7.7 mg/dL (0.2 mmol/L) (5% decrease) in serum LDL concentration.

=== Depression and anxiety ===
A 2019 meta-analysis found low-quality evidence for probiotics having a small improvement in depression and anxiety. A 2020 review found probiotics might improve depression, but more studies are needed.

=== Diarrhea ===
Some probiotics are suggested as a possible treatment for various forms of gastroenteritis. As a treatment for infectious diarrhea, probiotics are of no benefit to people who have the condition for more than two days, and there is no evidence they lessen the duration of diarrhea overall.

=== Dermatitis ===
Probiotics are commonly given to breastfeeding mothers and their young children to prevent eczema (dermatitis), but no good evidence shows efficacy for this purpose. There is little evidence to support the use of probiotics to treat atopic dermatitis, and some risk of adverse effects. The American Academy of Dermatology stated: "The use of probiotics/prebiotics for the treatment of patients with established atopic dermatitis is not recommended due to inconsistent evidence".

=== Acne ===
A review of probiotics and synbiotics in acne indicate that several preparations for reducing inflammatory acne lesions are under preliminary research, showing potential to reduce acne lesions, improve skin barrier function, and decrease inflammatory markers.

=== Glycemic control ===
According to an umbrella review of meta-analyses of randomized controlled trials, probiotics supplementation reduces glucose homeostasis. This can be an effective therapy for lowering high blood sugar levels unless the body becomes hypoglycemic; caution and glucose monitoring are necessary to avoid this.

=== Helicobacter pylori ===
Some strains of lactic acid bacteria (LAB) may affect Helicobacter pylori infections (which may cause peptic ulcers) in adults when used in combination with standard medical treatments, but no standard in medical practice or regulatory approval exists for such treatment. The only peer-reviewed treatments for H. pylori to date all include various Antibiotic Regimens.

=== Immune function and infections ===
Some strains of LAB may affect pathogens by means of competitive inhibition (i.e., by competing for growth) and some evidence suggests they may improve immune function by increasing the number of IgA-producing plasma cells and increasing or improving phagocytosis, as well as increasing the proportion of T lymphocytes and natural killer cells. LAB products might aid in the treatment of acute diarrhea and possibly affect rotavirus infections in children and travelers' diarrhea in adults, but no products are approved for such indications. There are weak evidence probiotics might lower the incidence of acute upper respiratory tract infections in adults, they were better than placebo or no treatment.

Probiotics do not appear to change the risk of infection in older people.

=== Inflammatory bowel disease ===
The use of oral probiotic supplements to modify the composition and behavior of the microbiome has been considered as a possible therapy for both induction and maintenance of remission in people with Crohn's disease and ulcerative colitis. A Cochrane review in 2020 did not find clear evidence of improved remission likelihood, nor lower adverse events, in people with Crohn's disease, following probiotic treatment.

For ulcerative colitis, there is low-certainty evidence that probiotic supplements may increase the probability of clinical remission. People receiving probiotics were 73% more likely to experience disease remission and over 2x as likely to report improvement in symptoms compared to those receiving a placebo, with no clear difference in minor or serious adverse effects. Although there was no clear evidence of greater remission when probiotic supplements were compared with 5‐aminosalicylic acid treatment as a monotherapy, the likelihood of remission was 22% higher if probiotics were used in combination with 5-aminosalicylic acid therapy. Whereas in people who are already in remission, it is unclear whether probiotics help to prevent future relapse, either as a monotherapy or combination therapy.

=== Irritable bowel syndrome ===
Probiotics are under study for their potential to affect irritable bowel syndrome, although uncertainty remains around which type of probiotic works best, and around the size of possible effect.

=== Necrotizing enterocolitis ===
Several clinical studies provide evidence for the potential of probiotics to lower the risk of necrotizing enterocolitis and mortality in premature infants. One meta-analysis indicated that probiotics reduce these risks by more than 50% compared with controls but that further, large, high-quality trials were needed to inform policy and practice.

=== Pregnancy ===
A Cochrane systematic review found no good evidence that probiotics were of benefit in reducing the risk of gestational diabetes, but good evidence that they increased the risk of pre-eclampsia. For this reason, the use of probiotics in pregnancy was advised against.

=== Recurrent abdominal pain ===
A 2017 review based on moderate to low-quality evidence suggests that probiotics may be helpful in relieving pain in the short term in children with recurrent abdominal pain, but the proper strain and dosage are not known.

=== Dry eye ===
A clinical study investigating the impact of probiotics in relieving the signs and symptoms of dry eye revealed promising results for the ophthalmic formulation of Latilactobacillus sakei, while the oral probiotic demonstrated no discernible benefits.

=== Urinary tract ===
There is limited evidence indicating probiotics are of benefit in the management of infection or inflammation of the urinary tract. One literature review found Lactobacillus probiotic supplements appeared to increase vaginal lactobacilli levels, thus reducing the incidence of vaginal infections in otherwise healthy adult women.

== General research ==
=== Formulations ===
Supplements such as tablets, capsules, powders, and sachets containing bacteria have been studied. However, probiotics taken orally can be destroyed by the acidic conditions of the stomach. As of 2010, a number of microencapsulation techniques were being developed to address this problem.

=== Multiple probiotics ===
Preliminary research is evaluating the potential physiological effects of multiple probiotic strains, as opposed to a single strain. As the human gut may contain tens of thousands of microbial species, one theory indicates that this diverse environment may benefit from consuming multiple probiotic strains, an effect that remains scientifically unconfirmed.

=== Strains ===
Only preliminary evidence exists for most probiotic health claims. Even for the most studied probiotic strains, few have been sufficiently developed in basic and clinical research to warrant approval for health claim status by a regulatory agency such as the FDA or EFSA, and as of 2010, no claims had been approved by those two agencies. Some experts are skeptical about the efficacy of different probiotic strains and believe that not all subjects benefit from probiotics.

=== Storage temperature ===
Multiple studies have shown that there is a significant difference in the survival rate of Lactobacillus and Bifidobacterium under refrigerated (4 °C) and room temperature (25 °C) storage conditions. At room temperature (25±1 °C), the number of probiotics decreased by 5 to 6 logarithmic units (down to 1/100,000) after 90 days of storage. In contrast, no significant change in the number of probiotics was observed under refrigerated conditions (4 ± 1 °C).

== Scientific guidelines for testing ==
First, probiotics must be alive when administered. One of the concerns throughout the scientific literature resides in the viability and reproducibility on a large scale of observed results for specific studies, as well as the viability and stability during use and storage, and finally the ability to survive in stomach acids and then in the intestinal ecosystem.

Second, probiotics must have undergone controlled evaluation to document health benefits in the target host. Only products that contain live organisms shown in reproducible human studies to confer a health benefit may claim to be probiotic. The correct definition of health benefit, backed with solid scientific evidence, is a strong element for the proper identification and assessment of the effect of a probiotic. This aspect is a challenge for scientific and industrial investigations because several difficulties arise, such as variability in the site for probiotic use (oral, vaginal, intestinal) and mode of application.

Third, the probiotic candidate must be a taxonomically defined microbe or combination of microbes (genus, species, and strain level). It is commonly admitted that most effects of probiotics are strain-specific and cannot be extended to other probiotics of the same genus or species. This calls for precise identification of the strain, i.e. genotypic and phenotypic characterization of the tested microorganism.

Fourth, probiotics must be safe for their intended use. The 2002 FAO/WHO guidelines recommend that, though bacteria may be generally recognized as safe (GRAS), the safety of the potential probiotic be assessed by the minimum required tests:

- Assessment of certain metabolic activities (e.g. D-lactate production, bile salt deconjugation)
- Assessment of side effects in human studies
- Determination of antibiotic resistance patterns
- Epidemiological surveillance of adverse incidents in consumers (aftermarket)
- If the strain under evaluation belongs to a species known to produce toxins in mammals, it must be tested for toxin production. One possible scheme for testing toxin production has been recommended by the EU Scientific Committee on Animal Nutrition.
- If the strain under evaluation belongs to a species with known hemolytic potential, determination of hemolytic activity is required.

In Europe, EFSA adopted a premarket system for the safety assessment of microbial species used in food and feed productions to set priorities for the need for risk assessment. The assessment is made for certain microorganisms; if the result is favorable, it leads to "Qualified Presumption of Safety" status.

== See also ==
- Dysbiosis
- Fecal bacteriotherapy
- Functional food
- Microbial drug delivery
- Microbial food cultures
- Postbiotic
- Probiotics in pediatrics
- Proteobiotics
- Psychobiotic
- Synbiotics
