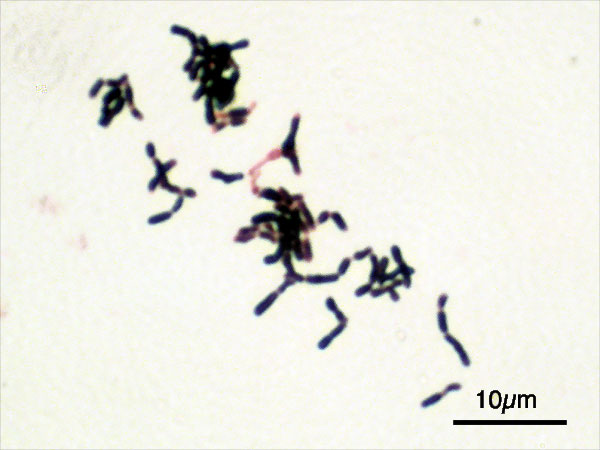
- Bifidobacterium adolescentis

Scientific classification
- Domain: Bacteria
- Kingdom: Bacillati
- Phylum: Actinomycetota
- Class: Actinomycetes
- Order: Bifidobacteriales; Stackebrandt et al. 1997
- Family: Bifidobacteriaceae; Stackebrandt et al. 1997

Type genus
- Bifidobacterium Orla-Jensen 1924 (Approved Lists 1980)

Genera
- Aeriscardovia Simpson et al. 2004; Alloscardovia Huys et al. 2007; Bifidobacterium Orla-Jensen 1924 (Approved Lists 1980); Bombiscardovia Killer et al. 2014; Galliscardovia Pechar et al. 2017; Gardnerella Greenwood and Pickett 1980; Neoscardovia García-Aljaro et al. 2015; Parascardovia Jian and Dong 2002; Pseudoscardovia Killer et al. 2014; Scardovia Jian and Dong 2002

= Bifidobacteriaceae =

Family of bacteria

The Bifidobacteriaceae are the only family of bacteria in the order Bifidobacteriales.

The family Bifidobacteriaceae stain [Gram-positive], range from obligate to faculatively anaerobic, are non-motile, non-filamentous and non-spore forming. Their morphology is varied and ranges from Y- or V-shaped (from which the bifidobacteria derived their name) to ones with enlarged or flattened ends (club- or spatula-shaped). The branching nature of Bifidobacteria can change with different starins and media. These rods appear as a solitary bacilli or as aggregates in chains or in clumps.

These chemoorganotrophic microorganisms are saccharolytic acid producers and do not produce gas.

The Bifidobacteriaceae family is divided into ten genera ( Bifidobacterium, Aeriscardovia, Alloscardovia, Bombiscardovia, Galliscardovia, Gardnerella, Neoscardovia, Parascardovia, Pseudoscardovia, and Scardovia, with three candidate genera Candidatus Ancillula, Candidatus Opitulatrix, and Candidatus Servula.

== Genomics ==
All Bifidobacteraceae contain a peculiar metabolic pathway to catabolise six-carbon sugars (hexoses) involving the key enzyme Fructose-6-phosphate phosphoketolase (EC 4.1.2.2), known as the fructose-6-phosphate pathway or the 'bifid shunt'.

Comparative analysis of aligned protein sequences has led to the discovery of two conserved signature indels which are specific for the order Bifidobacteriales. The first indel, a 1 amino acid deletion in ribosomal protein L13, is found in all Bifidobacteriales species and no other Actinomycetota, providing a potential molecular marker for the entire Bifidobacteriales order. The second indel that has been identified is a 1 amino acid insertion in glucose-6-phosphate dehydrogenase found in all Bifidobacterium species and G. vaginalis, but not in any other Actinomycetota. This indel is thus characteristic of the clade consisting of Bifidobacterium species and G. vaginalis and can be used to distinguish these genera from the rest of the order Bifidobacteriales. 16 conserved signature proteins have also been identified which are unique to the order Bifidobacteriales and can be used as molecular markers for this order. Additionally, 6 conserved signature proteins which are unique to Bifidobacterium and Gardnerella have been identified, providing further evidence that species from these two genera are closely related and providing molecular markers for the clade consisting of these genera.

== Phylogeny ==
The currently accepted taxonomy is based on the List of Prokaryotic names with Standing in Nomenclature (LPSN). The phylogeny is based on whole-genome analysis.

- - Bifidobacteriales
    - - - Candidatus Nutricula
        - - Candidatus Ancillula
          - - Candidatus Opitulatrix
            - Candidatus Servula
      - - Aeriscardovia
        - - - Pseudoscardovia
            - - Alloscardovia
              - - Scardovia
                - Parascardovia
          - - Galliscardovia
            - - - Bifidobacterium
                - Bombiscardovia
              - Gardnerella
- outgroup
  Actinomycetales
