= Fodinibacter luteus =

Scientific classification
- Domain: Bacteria
- Kingdom: Bacillati
- Phylum: Actinomycetota
- Class: Actinomycetia
- Order: Micrococcales
- Family: Intrasporangiaceae
- Genus: Fodinibacter
- Species: F. luteus

Binomial name
- Fodinibacter luteus Wang et al. 2009

Type strain
- CCTCC AA 208036; DSM 21208; YIM C003

Species of bacterium

Fodinibacter luteus is a species of Gram positive, nonmotile, non-sporeforming bacteria. The bacteria are strictly aerobic and mesophilic, and the cells are irregular rods. It was originally isolated from a salt mine in Yunnan, China. The species name is derived from luteus (yellow), referring the bacterial colony color on agar. F. luteus is the type species of genus Fodinibacter.

The optimum growth temperature for F. luteus is 28 °C and can grow in the 15-37 °C range. The optimum pH is 6.5-7.5. The bacteria grow poorly in the absence of NaCl.
