= J. brevis =

J. brevis may refer to:

- Janibacter terrae, a Gram-positive bacterium, which includes the former species Janibacter brevis.
- Jeletzkytes brevis, an extinct genus of scaphatoid ammonite in the genus Jeletzkytes.
- Joculator brevis, a species of sea snail.
