= Phycicoccus =

Scientific classification
- Domain: Bacteria
- Kingdom: Bacillati
- Phylum: Actinomycetota
- Class: Actinomycetia
- Order: Micrococcales
- Family: Intrasporangiaceae
- Genus: Phycicoccus; Lee 2006

Type species
- Phycicoccus jejuensis Lee 2006

Species
- P. avicenniae Chen et al. 2022; P. duodecadis (Lochhead 1958) Nouioui et al. 2018; P. elongatus (Hanada et al. 2002) Nouioui et al. 2018; P. endophyticus Liu et al. 2016; P. flavus Chen et al. 2021; P. ginsengisoli Kang et al. 2016; P. jejuensis Lee 2006; "P. mangrovi" Chen et al. 2021; "P. ochangensis" Kim et al. 2012

Genus of bacteria

Phycicoccus is a genus of Gram positive, aerobic, non-endosporeforming bacteria. Species in this genus are mesophilic and have cells that are short rods or coccoid.

The genus was first proposed in 2006. The type species P. jejuensis was first isolated from dried seaweed from a beach in South Korea. The genus name is derived from Latin phycos (seaweed) and coccus, referring to the source of the original isolate and the shape of the cells. Other members of this genus have been initially isolated from air, soil, bark, and scoria.

Species from this genus produce yellow, white, or cream-colored colonies on R2A agar. All species are mesophilic; most species cannot grow at temperatures above 35-37 °C. P. jejuensis is the only psychrotrophs.

In 2018, several species were transferred to the genus Pedococcus.
