= Mesophilum =

Mesophilum may refer to:

- Intrasporangium mesophilum, species of bacteria
- Marininema mesophilum, species of bacteria
- Parafrigoribacterium mesophilum, species of bacteria
- Rubellimicrobium mesophilum, species of bacteria
- Tenacibaculum mesophilum, species of bacteria
