= T. australiensis =

T. australiensis may refer to:

- Tetrasphaera australiensis, a species of Gram-positive bacterium in the family Intrasporangiaceae
- Trichoglottis australiensis, the weeping cherub orchid, a species of clump-forming orchid
- Triops australiensis, the shield shrimp, a species of tadpole shrimp
- Trypaea australiensis, the Australian ghost shrimp, a species of ghost shrimp in the family Callianassidae
