= Kribbia =

Scientific classification
- Domain: Bacteria
- Kingdom: Bacillati
- Phylum: Actinomycetota
- Class: Actinomycetes
- Order: Micrococcales
- Family: Intrasporangiaceae
- Genus: Kribbia; Jung 2006

Species
- K. dieselivorans

Genus of bacteria

Kribbia is a genus of Gram positive, nonmotile, non-sporeforming bacteria. The bacteria are facultatively anaerobic and mesophilic. Cells of the genus can be irregular rods or coccoid. The genus is named after the Korea Research Institute of Bioscience and Biotechnology (KRIBB), where research on the type species was performed.

The type species of the genus, Kribbia dieselivorans, was originally isolated from tidal flat sediment collected from Kwangyang, South Korea during a survey for diesel-degrading bacteria. The genus is monospecific, with K. dieselivorans as the only species.
