= Ornithinibacter =

Scientific classification
- Domain: Bacteria
- Kingdom: Bacillati
- Phylum: Actinomycetota
- Class: Actinomycetes
- Order: Micrococcales
- Family: Intrasporangiaceae
- Genus: Ornithinibacter; Xiao et al. 2011

Species
- O. aureus

Genus of bacteria

Ornithinibacter is a genus of Gram positive, nonmotile, non-sporeforming bacteria. The bacteria are strictly aerobic and mesophilic. Cells of the genus are irregular rods that form branching hyphae. The genus name refers to L-Ornithine, the major diagnostic diamino acid in the peptidoglycan. The genus is monospecific, with O. aureus as the only species.
