= O. aureus =

O. aureus may refer to:

- Oreochromis aureus, a species of fish also known as the blue tilapia.
- Ornithinibacter aureus, a Gram-positive bacterium.
