= Pedococcus cremeus =

Scientific classification
- Domain: Bacteria
- Kingdom: Bacillati
- Phylum: Actinomycetota
- Class: Actinomycetes
- Order: Micrococcales
- Family: Intrasporangiaceae
- Genus: Pedococcus
- Species: P. cremeus

Binomial name
- Pedococcus cremeus (Zhang et al. 2011) Nouioui et al. 2018

Synonyms
- Phycicoccus cremeus Zhang et al. 2011

Species of bacteria

Pedococcus cremeus is a species of Gram positive, strictly aerobic, non-motile, non-endosporeforming bacterium. The species was first isolated from forest soil in the Changbai Mountains. The species was described in 2011. Its name refers to the cream-colored colonies the species produces on R2A agar.

P. cremeus grows opitmally at 29°C, within a temperature range of 14-35°C. It has an optimum pH of 7.0-8.0, but can grow in a broader pH range of 4.1-10.0.
