= Pedococcus dokdonensis =

Scientific classification
- Domain: Bacteria
- Kingdom: Bacillati
- Phylum: Actinomycetota
- Class: Actinomycetia
- Order: Micrococcales
- Family: Intrasporangiaceae
- Genus: Pedococcus
- Species: P. dokdonensis

Binomial name
- Pedococcus dokdonensis (Yoon et al. 2008) Nouioui et al. 2018

Synonyms
- Phycicoccus dokdonensis Yoon et al. 2008

Species of bacteria

Pedococcus dokdonensis is a species of Gram positive, strictly aerobic, non-motile, non-endosporeforming bacterium. The species was initially isolated from soil from the Liancourt Rocks, South Korea. The species was first described in 2008, and its name describes the species as coming from Dokdo (Korean name for the disputed Liancourt Rocks).

The optimum growth temperature for P. dokdonensis is 30 °C and can grow in the 10-36 °C range. The optimum pH is 6.5-7.5, and can grow in pH 5.0-8.5.
