= J. terrae =

J. terrae may refer to:

- Janibacter terrae, a Gram-positive bacterium.
- Jeotgalibacillus terrae, a Gram-positive bacterium in the genus Jeotgalibacillus.
