= Humibacillus xanthopallidus =

Scientific classification
- Domain: Bacteria
- Kingdom: Bacillati
- Phylum: Actinomycetota
- Class: Actinomycetia
- Order: Micrococcales
- Family: Intrasporangiaceae
- Genus: Humibacillus; Kageyama et al. 2008
- Species: H. xanthopallidus

Binomial name
- Humibacillus xanthopallidus Kageyama et al. 2008

Type strain
- DSM 21776; JCM 15923; KV-663; NBRC 101803; NRRL B-24471

Genus of bacteria

Humibacillus xanthopallidus is a species of Gram positive, nonmotile, non-sporeforming bacteria. The bacteria are strictly aerobic and mesophilic. Cells of the genus are irregular rods. Humibacillus xanthopallidus, was originally isolated from both a paddy field in Saitama Prefecture, Japan and from a sediment collected from Lake Jusanko, Aomori Prefecture, Japan.
