= Janibacter limosus =

Scientific classification
- Domain: Bacteria
- Kingdom: Bacillati
- Phylum: Actinomycetota
- Class: Actinomycetes
- Order: Micrococcales
- Family: Intrasporangiaceae
- Genus: Janibacter
- Species: J. limosus

Binomial name
- Janibacter limosus Martin et al. 1997

Species of bacteria

Janibacter limosus is a species of Gram positive, strictly aerobic, bacterium. The species was initially isolated from sludge from a wastewater treatment plant in Jena, Germany. The species was first described in 1997, and the species name is derived from Latin limosus (muddy). J. limosus was the first species assigned to Janibacter, and is the type species for the genus.

The optimum growth temperature for J. limosus is 28 °C, and can grow in temperatures in the 4-40 °C range. The optimum pH is 7.0-8.0, and can grow in 6.0-12.0.
