= Lapillicoccus jejuensis =

Scientific classification
- Domain: Bacteria
- Kingdom: Bacillati
- Phylum: Actinomycetota
- Class: Actinomycetia
- Order: Micrococcales
- Family: Intrasporangiaceae
- Genus: Lapillicoccus; Lee and Lee 2007
- Species: L. jejuensis

Binomial name
- Lapillicoccus jejuensis Lee and Lee 2007

Species of bacterium

Lapillicoccus jejuensis is a species of Gram positive, nonmotile, non-sporeforming bacteria. The bacteria are aerobic and mesophilic, and the cells are coccoid. The species was first described in 2007, and it was originally isolated a stone in Jeju, South Korea. The species name refers to the area (Jeju) from which it was first isolated. L. jejuensis is the type species of genus Lapillicoccus, and is currently the only species in the genus.

The optimum growth temperature for Lapillicoccus jejuensis is 30 °C and can grow in the 20-37 °C range. The optimum pH is 7.1, and can grow in the 4.1-11.1 range. Cells form bright yellow-pigmented colonies on agar.
