= Phycicoccus elongatus =

Scientific classification
- Domain: Bacteria
- Kingdom: Bacillati
- Phylum: Actinomycetota
- Class: Actinomycetes
- Order: Micrococcales
- Family: Intrasporangiaceae
- Genus: Phycicoccus
- Species: P. elongatus

Binomial name
- Phycicoccus elongatus (Hanada et al. 2002) Nouioui et al. 2018

Type strain
- Lp2^{T} JCM 11141^{T} DSM 14184^{T}

Synonyms
- Tetrasphaera elongata Hanada et al. 2002

Species of bacterium

Phycicoccus elongatus is a polyphosphate-accumulating bacterium. It is meso-diaminopimelic acid-containing, gram-positive, asporogenous oval- to rod-shaped and an aerobic chemoheterotroph.
