= Janibacter cremeus =

Scientific classification
- Domain: Bacteria
- Kingdom: Bacillati
- Phylum: Actinomycetota
- Class: Actinomycetes
- Order: Micrococcales
- Family: Intrasporangiaceae
- Genus: Janibacter
- Species: J. cremeus

Binomial name
- Janibacter cremeus Hamada et al. 2013

Species of bacterium

Janibacter cremeus is a species of Gram positive, facultatively anaerobic, bacterium. The species was initially isolated from sea sediment near Rishiri Island, Hokkaido, Japan. The species was first described in 2013, and the species name refers to its cream-pigmented colonies when grown on agar.

The optimum growth temperature for J. cremeus is 25 °C, and can grow in the 10-30 °C range. The optimum pH is 7.0, and can grow at 6.0-10.0.
