= Pedococcus bigeumensis =

Scientific classification
- Domain: Bacteria
- Kingdom: Bacillati
- Phylum: Actinomycetota
- Class: Actinomycetia
- Order: Micrococcales
- Family: Intrasporangiaceae
- Genus: Pedococcus
- Species: P. bigeumensis

Binomial name
- Pedococcus bigeumensis (Dastager et al. 2008) Nouioui et al. 2018

Synonyms
- Phycicoccus bigeumensis Dastager et al 2008

Species of bacteria

Pedococcus bigeumensis is a species of Gram positive, strictly aerobic, non-motile, non-endosporeforming bacterium. The species was initially isolated from soil on Bigeum Island, South Korea. The species was first described in 2013, and its name refers to the island from which it was first isolated.

The optimum growth temperature for P. bigeumensis is 28 °C and can grow in the 20-37 °C range. The optimum pH is 7.4, and can grow in pH 7.0-12.0.
