= Oryzihumus terrae =

Scientific classification
- Domain: Bacteria
- Kingdom: Bacillati
- Phylum: Actinomycetota
- Class: Actinomycetes
- Order: Micrococcales
- Family: Intrasporangiaceae
- Genus: Oryzihumus
- Species: O. terrae

Binomial name
- Oryzihumus terrae Lim et al. 2014

Type strain
- DSM 27161; KACC 16543; KIS22-12; NBRC 109596

Species of bacterium

Oryzihumus terrae is a Gram-positive and aerobic bacterium species from the genus Oryzihumus which has been isolated from soil from Baengnyongdo, Onjin County, Incheon, Korea.
