= Intrasporangium chromatireducens =

Scientific classification
- Domain: Bacteria
- Kingdom: Bacillati
- Phylum: Actinomycetota
- Class: Actinomycetia
- Order: Micrococcales
- Family: Intrasporangiaceae
- Genus: Intrasporangium
- Species: I. chromatireducens

Binomial name
- Intrasporangium chromatireducens Liu et al. 2012

Species of bacteria

Intrasporangium chromatireducens is a species of Gram positive, strictly aerobic bacterium. The species was initially isolated from manganese mining soil in Hunan Province, China. The species was first described in 2012, and its name refers to the species ability to reduce chromate.

The optimum growth temperature for I. chromatireducens is 37 °C and can grow in the 10-45 °C range. The optimum pH is 8.0 and can grow in pH 5.0-10.0.
