= I. calvum =

I. calvum may refer to:

- Intrasporangium calvum, a Gram-positive bacterium.
- Iseilema calvum, a species of grass in genus Iseilema
