= Oryzihumus soli =

Scientific classification
- Domain: Bacteria
- Kingdom: Bacillati
- Phylum: Actinomycetota
- Class: Actinomycetes
- Order: Micrococcales
- Family: Intrasporangiaceae
- Genus: Oryzihumus
- Species: O. soli

Binomial name
- Oryzihumus soli Kim et al. 2017

Type strain
- KACC 18485; KCTC 39705; NBRC 111450; Aerobe-19

Species of bacterium

Oryzihumus soli is a Gram-positive and aerobic bacterium species from the genus Oryzihumus which has been isolated from the lawn of Seoul National University in Korea.
