= Janibacter anophelis =

Scientific classification
- Domain: Bacteria
- Kingdom: Bacillati
- Phylum: Actinomycetota
- Class: Actinomycetes
- Order: Micrococcales
- Family: Intrasporangiaceae
- Genus: Janibacter
- Species: J. anophelis

Binomial name
- Janibacter anophelis Kämpfer et al. 2006

Species of bacterium

Janibacter anophelis is a species of Gram positive, strictly aerobic, bacterium. The species was initially isolated from the midgut of a Anopheles arabiensis mosquito. The species was first described in 2006, and the species name is derived from the mosquito genus Anopheles.

The optimum growth temperature for J. anophelis is 35 °C (95 °F), and can grow in the 20–40 °C (68–104 °F) range.
