= Streptomyces glauciniger =

Scientific classification
- Domain: Bacteria
- Kingdom: Bacillati
- Phylum: Actinomycetota
- Class: Actinomycetes
- Order: Streptomycetales
- Family: Streptomycetaceae
- Genus: Streptomyces
- Species: S. glauciniger

Binomial name
- Streptomyces glauciniger Huang et al. 2004

Type strain
- AS 4.1858, CGMCC 4.1858, DSM 41867, FXJ14, JCM 12278, Lanoot R-17701, Liu FXJ14, LMG 22082, NBRC 100913, NRRL B-24320

Species of bacterium

Streptomyces glauciniger is a mesophilic bacterium species from the genus of Streptomyces which has been isolated from soil in south China.

== See also ==
- List of Streptomyces species
