= Phycicoccus ginsengisoli =

Scientific classification
- Domain: Bacteria
- Kingdom: Bacillati
- Phylum: Actinomycetota
- Class: Actinomycetia
- Order: Micrococcales
- Family: Intrasporangiaceae
- Genus: Phycicoccus
- Species: P. ginsengisoli

Binomial name
- Phycicoccus ginsengisoli Kang 2016

Species of bacteria

Phycicoccus ginsengisoli is a species of Gram positive, strictly aerobic, non-endospore-forming bacterium. The species was initially isolated from soil from a ginseng field in Gochang County, South Korea. The species was first described in 2016, and its name refers to the source of isolation (ginseng soil).

The optimum growth temperature for P. ginsengisoli is 30 °C (86 °F) and can grow in the 10–37 °C (50–99 °F) range. The optimum pH is 7.0, and can grow in pH 6.0-9.0.
