= M. asiaticum =

M. asiaticum may refer to:

- Marihabitans asiaticum, a species of Gram-positive bacterium.
- Milnesium asiaticum, a species of Eutardigrades.
- Mycobacterium asiaticum, a species of bacteria.
