= P. endophyticus =

P. endophyticus may refer to:

- Phycicoccus endophyticus, a Gram-positive bacterium.
- Pseudoclavibacter endophyticus, a Gram-positive bacterium.
- Pseudogracilibacillus endophyticus, a Gram-positive bacterium.
- Pseudonocardia endophytica (synonym for Pseudonocardia endophyticus), a Gram-positive bacterium.
