= Janibacter indicus =

Scientific classification
- Domain: Bacteria
- Kingdom: Bacillati
- Phylum: Actinomycetota
- Class: Actinomycetia
- Order: Micrococcales
- Family: Intrasporangiaceae
- Genus: Janibacter
- Species: J. indicus

Binomial name
- Janibacter indicus Zhang et al. 2014

Species of bacteria

Janibacter indicus is a species of Gram positive, aerobic, bacterium. The species was initially isolated from hydrothermal sediment from the Indian Ocean. The species was first described in 2014, and the species named refers to the Indian Ocean.

The optimum growth temperature for J. indicus is 28-30 °C, and can grow in the 15-40 °C range. The optimum pH is 7.0-8.0, and can grow at 6.0-11.0.
