= Janibacter hoylei =

Scientific classification
- Domain: Bacteria
- Kingdom: Bacillati
- Phylum: Actinomycetota
- Class: Actinomycetes
- Order: Micrococcales
- Family: Intrasporangiaceae
- Genus: Janibacter
- Species: J. hoylei

Binomial name
- Janibacter hoylei Shivaji et al. 2009

Species of bacterium

Janibacter hoylei is a species of Gram positive, aerobic, bacterium. The species was initially isolated from cryovials that sampled high altitude air between 20 and 41 km above sea level. The species was first described in 2009, and the species is named after English astronomer Fred Hoyle. Two other new species were discovered during the same survey: Bacillus isronensis and Bacillus aryabhattai.

The optimum growth temperature for J. hoylei is 25-30 °C, and can grow in the 20-40 °C range. The optimum pH is 9.0, and can grow at 5.0-10.0. The species is more resistant to UV radiation than other members of Janibacter.

There are reported cases of Janibacter hoylei bacteriemia (presence of living bacteries in bloodstream).
