= P. jejuensis =

P. jejuensis may refer to:

- Pedobacter jejuensis, a Gram-negative bacterium of the genus Pedobacter.
- Phycicoccus jejuensis, a Gram-positive bacterium.
- Polaromonas jejuensis, a Gram-negative bacterium.
