= Functional ecology =

Branch of ecology

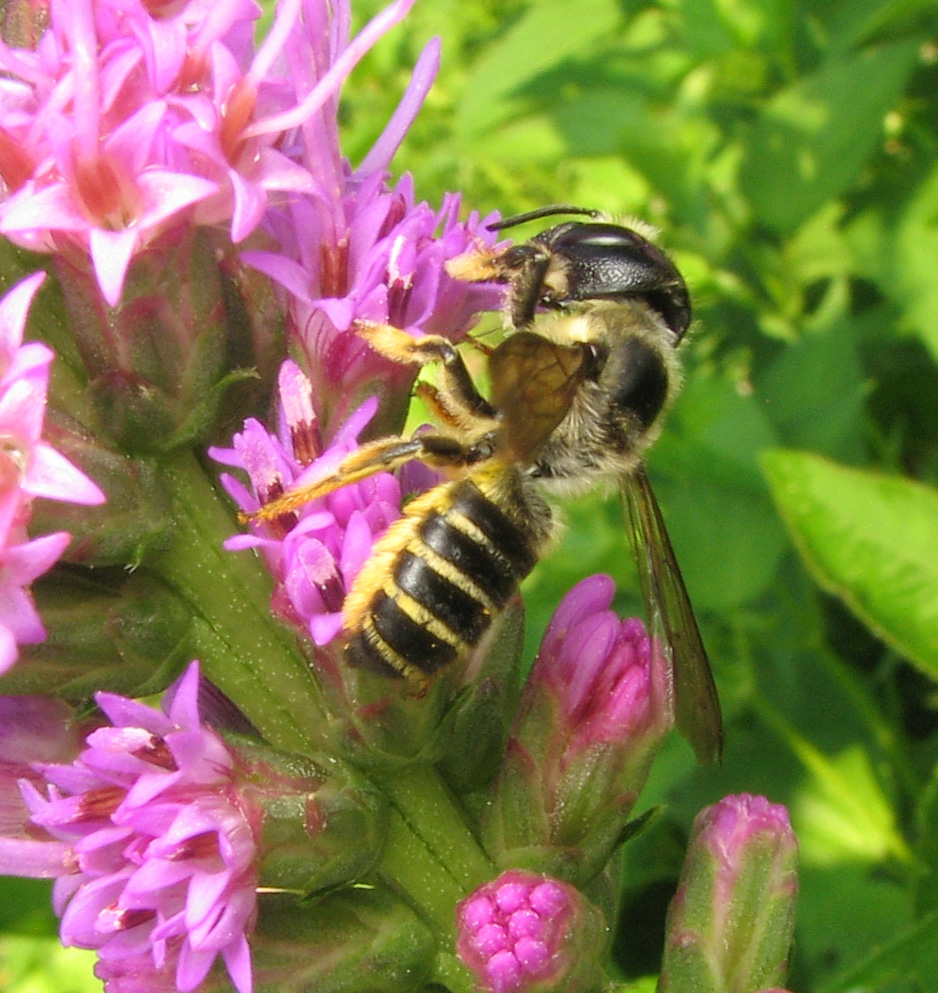
Bees serve the ecological function of pollinating flowers, maintaining flora reproduction and density in the ecosystem.

Functional ecology is a branch of ecology that focuses on the roles, or functions, that species play in the community or ecosystem in which they occur. In this approach, physiological, anatomical, and life history characteristics of the species are emphasized. The term "function" is used to emphasize certain physiological processes rather than discrete properties, describe an organism's role in a trophic system, or illustrate the effects of natural selective processes on an organism. This sub-discipline of ecology represents the crossroads between ecological patterns and the processes and mechanisms that underlie them.

Researchers use two different tools in functional ecology: screening, which involves measuring a trait across a number of species, and empiricism, which provides quantitative relationships for the traits measured in screening. Functional ecology often emphasizes an integrative approach, using organism traits and activities to understand community dynamics and ecosystem processes, particularly in response to the rapid global changes occurring in Earth's environment.

Functional ecology sits at the nexus of several disparate disciplines and serves as the unifying principle between evolutionary ecology, evolutionary biology, genetics and genomics, and traditional ecological studies. It explores such areas as "[species'] competitive abilities, patterns of species co-occurrence, community assembly, and the role of different traits on ecosystem functioning".

== History ==
The notion that ecosystems' functions can be affected by their constituent parts has its origins in the 19th century. Charles Darwin's On The Origin of Species is one of the first texts to directly comment on the effect of biodiversity on ecosystem health by noting a positive correlation between plant density and ecosystem productivity. In his influential 1927 work, Animal Ecology, Charles Elton proposed classifying an ecosystem based on the how its members utilize resources. By the 1950s, Elton's model of ecosystems was widely accepted, where organisms that shared similarities in resource use occupied the same 'guild' within an ecosystem.

Beginning in the 1970s, an increased interest in functional classification revolutionized functional ecology. 'Guilds' would be re-termed 'functional groups', and classification schemes began to focus more on interactions between species and trophic levels. Functional ecology became widely understood to be the study of ecological processes that concern the adaptations of organism within the ecosystem. In the 1990s, biodiversity became better understood as the diversity of species' ecological functions within an ecosystem, rather than simply a great number of different species present. Finally, in the 2000s researchers began using functional classification schemes to examine ecosystems' and organisms' responses to drastic change and disturbance, and the impact of function loss on the health of an ecosystem.

== Functional Diversity ==
Functional diversity is widely considered to be "the value and the range of those species and organismal traits that influence ecosystem functioning" In this sense, the use of the term "function" may apply to individuals, populations, communities, trophic levels, or evolutionary process (i.e. considering the function of adaptations). Functional diversity was conceived as an alternative classification to schemes using genetic diversity or physiological diversity to measure the ecological importance of species in an environment, as well as a way to understand how biodiversity affects specific ecosystem functions, where in this context, 'biodiversity' refers to the diversity of ecosystem functions present in a given system. Understanding ecosystems via functional diversity is as powerful as it is broadly applicable and gives insight into observable patterns in ecosystems, such as species occurrence, species competitive abilities, and the influence of biological communities on ecosystem functioning.

=== Impact on Ecosystem Health ===
A key interest of modern research in Functional Ecology is the impact of functional diversity on ecosystem health. Unsurprisingly, biodiversity has a positive impact on the productivity of an ecosystem. Increased functional diversity increases both the capacity of the ecosystem to regulate the flux of energy and matter through the environment (Ecosystem Functions) as well as the ecosystem's ability to produce resources beneficial to humans such as air, water, and wood (Ecosystem Services). Ecosystem Functions are drastically reduced with decreases in the diversity of genes, species and functional groups present within an ecosystem. In fact, reductions in functional diversity broadly impact the survivability of organisms in an environment regardless of functional group, trophic level, or species, implying that the organization and interaction of communities in an ecosystem has a profound impact on its ability to function and self-sustain. Furthermore, diversity improves environmental stability. The greater an ecosystem's diversity, the more resilient it is to changes in species composition (e.g. extinction events or invasive species) and extraneous changes to environmental conditions (e.g. logging, farming, and pollution). Moreover, the benefits that diversity provides to an environment scale non-linearly with the amount of diversity.

Unfortunately, this relationship also acts in the opposite direction. The loss of diversity non-linearly disrupts ecosystems (even stable ones); this negative impact is especially detrimental when the loss is across trophic levels. For, example, the loss of a single tertiary predator can have cascading effects on the food chain, resulting in reduction of plant biomass and genetic diversity. This in turn can alter the "vegetation structure, fire frequency, and even disease epidemics in a range of ecosystems". The effects of diversity on ecosystems are so powerful, that they can rival the impact of climate change and other global ecosystem stressors.

Alternatively, in rare situations, diversity has been shown to retard ecological productivity. In experimentally concocted microscopic environments, a diverse culture of bacteria was unable to out-produce a homogeneous culture of an 'efficient' control strain. However, the statistical validity and setup of these experiments have been questioned, and require further investigation to carry substantial merit. In general, the current consensus that diversity is beneficial to ecosystem health has much more theoretical and empirical support and is more widely applicable.

=== Scaling ===
Most models of complex functional diversity are only effective in a small range of spatial scales. However, by defining the functional trait probability density as a "function representing the distribution of probabilities of observing each possible trait value in a given ecological unit," the results of many models can be generalized to larger scales. At larger spatial scales, more environmental heterogeneity may increase opportunities for species to exploit more functional groups. Consistent with this conclusion, tests of theoretical models predict that the net effects of biodiversity on ecosystem functions grow stronger over time, over larger spatial scales, and with more heterogeneous natural resources. However, these results are expected to underestimate the actual relationshipm impling that large space and time scales coupled with diverse resources are more than necessary to sustain an ecosystem.

== Applications of Functional Ecology ==
A functional approach to understanding and dealing with environments provides numerous benefits to our understanding of biology and its applications in our lives. While the concept of functional ecology is still in its infancy, it has been widely applied throughout biological studies to better understand organisms, environments, and their interactions.

=== Species Detection and Classification ===
The notions of functional ecology have beneficial implications for species detection and classification. When detecting species, ecologically important traits, such as plant height, influence the probability of detection during field surveys. When holistically analyzing an environment, the systematic error of imperfect species detection can lead to incorrect trait-environment evolutionary conclusions as well as poor estimates of functional trait diversity and environmental role. For example, if small species of insects are less likely to be detected, researchers may conclude that they are much more scarce (and thus less impactful) in the environment than larger species of insects. This 'detection filtering' has major consequences on functional packaging and the defining functional groups in an ecosystem. Thankfully, correlations between environmental change and evolutionary adaptation are much larger than the effects of imperfect species detection. Nevertheless, approaching ecosystems with theoretical maps of functional relationships between species and groups can reduce the likelihood of improper detection and improve the robustness of any biological conclusions drawn.

=== Functional traits ===
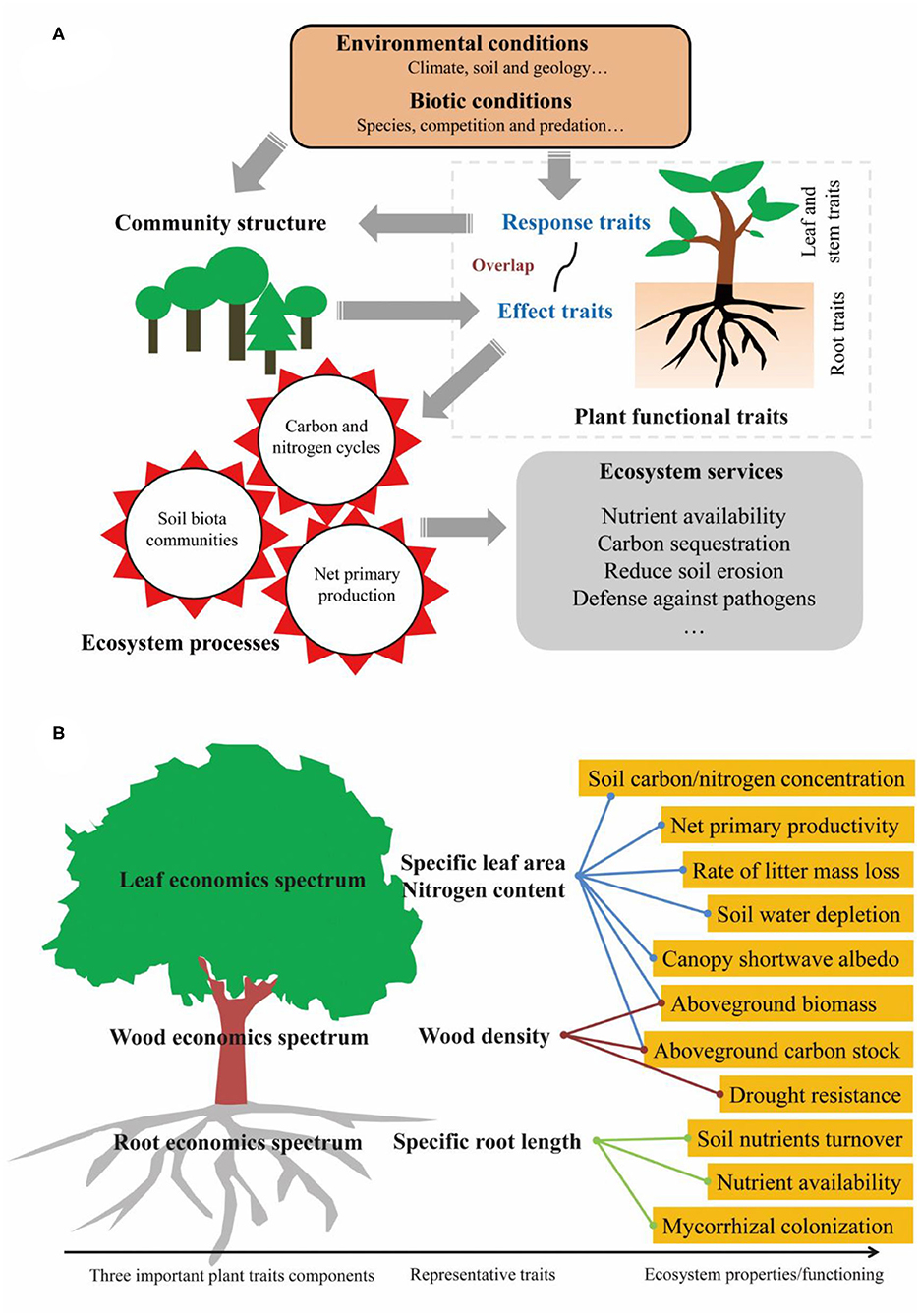
Interactions between functional traits and ecosystem functioning

A functional approach to defining traits can even help species classification. Trait focused schemes of taxonomy have long been used to classify species, but the number and type of 'trait' to consider is widely debated. Considering more traits in a classification scheme will separate species into more specific functional groups, but may lead to an overestimation of total functional diversity in the environment. However, considering too few traits runs the risk of classifying species as functionally redundant, when they are in fact vital to the health of the ecosystem. So, before one can classify organisms by traits, the definition of 'trait' must be settled. Rather than define traits as proxies for organism performance, as Darwin did, modern ecologists favor a more robust definition of traits often referred to as "functional traits". Under this paradigm, functional traits are defined as morpho-physiophenological traits which impact fitness indirectly via their effects on growth, reproduction and survival. Notice that is definition is not specific to species. Since larger biological organizations grow, reproduce and sustain just as individual organisms do, functional traits can be used to describe ecosystem processes and properties as well. To distinguish between functional traits at different scales, the classification scheme adopts the following nomenclature. Individual organisms have Ecophysiological traits and life-history traits; populations have demographic traits; communities have response traits; and ecosystems have effect traits. At each level, functional traits can directly and indirectly influence functional traits in the levels above or below them. For example, when averaged over an ecosystem, individual plants' heights can contribute to ecosystem productivity or efficiency.

Trait	Scale	Scope	Examples
Ecophysiological	Individual	Physiological quality that affects relative fitness	Leaf size can affect solar energy absorption
Life-history	Individual	Qualities that impact relative fitness and change over an individual's lifespan	Body size changes, lifespan, age to reproduction
Demographic	Population	Changes in a population over time	Birth and death rates
Response	Community	Community responses to environmental variables	Flora grow taller after a fire clears tree canopy
Effect	Ecosystem	Effects that involve an ecosystem functioning	The necessity of plants for an ecosystem to exist

=== Genomics ===
Functional Ecology is closely intertwined with genomics. Understanding the functional niches that organisms occupy in an ecosystem can provide clues to genetic differences between members of a genus. On the other hand, discovering the traits/functions that genes encode for yields insight into the roles that organisms perform in their environment. This kind of genomic study is referred to as genomic ecology or ecogenomics. Genomic ecology can classify traits on cellular and physiological levels leading to a more refined classification system. In addition, once genetic markers for functional traits in individuals are identified, predictions about the functional diversity and composition of an ecosystem can be made from the genetic data of a few species in a process called "reverse ecology". Reverse ecology can contribute to better taxonomy of organisms as well. Rather than defining species by genetic proximity alone, organisms can be additionally classified by the functions they serve in the same ecology.

This application of reverse ecology has proven especially useful in the classification of bacteria. Researchers were able to identify the correspondence between genetic variation and ecological niche function in the genus Agrobacterium and their greater biological implication on species distinction and diversity in the ecosystem. The researchers found that 196 genes specific to Agrobacterium fabrum coded for metabolic pathways specific to plants which allowed for the use of plant-specific compounds and sugars to avoid iron deficiency. This trait, unique to Agrobacterium fabrum, allowed it to avoid competition with closely related bacteria in Agrobacterium found within the same environment. Thus, understanding the genetics of Agrobacterium fabrum allowed researchers to infer that it evolved into the niche (i.e. ecological role) of a plant so that it could avoid competing with its close relatives. If this process can be shown to generalize, then the ecological functions of other organisms can be inferred simply from genetic information.

However, reverse ecology and genomic ecology face several hurdles before they can be accepted as rigorous and mainstream approaches to taxonomy or ecology. One of the major challenges is that technologies for the sequencing and comparison of transcriptomic data do not exist, making the acquisition of transcriptomic data dependent on environmental conditions. Additionally, as studied environments increase in complexity, transcriptomic data becomes harder to collect. Furthermore, the functions that many discovered genes encode for are still unknown making it difficult if not impossible to infer ecological function from a genome. Testing hypotheses concerning what functions given genes encode for is difficult experimentally and is expensive and time-consuming.

=== De-extinction ===
Functional ecology also has broad applications to the science of and debate over de-extinction, the resurrection of extinct species. Function ecology can be applied to strategically assess the resurrection of extinct species to maximize its impact on an environment. To avoid reintroducing a species that is rendered functionally redundant by one of its ancestors, a functional analysis of global ecosystems can be performed to determine which ecosystems would benefit most from the added functional diversity of the reintroduced species. These considerations are important because, while many species currently being considered for de-extinction are terrestrial, they are also functionally redundant in their former ecosystems. However, many extinct marine species have been identified as functionally unique in their environments, even today, which makes a strong case for their reintroduction. In fact, while some functions have been recovered by evolution, as is the case with many extinct terrestrial species, some functional gaps have widened over time. Reintroducing extinct species has the potential to close these gaps, making richer, more balanced ecosystems.

Furthermore, before a species goes extinct in the classical sense of the word, keeping a functional perspective in mind can avoid "functional extinction". Functional extinction is defined as "the point at which a species fails to perform its historical functional role". Endangered species such as species of tigers, tuna and sea otters usually qualify for this threshold. If functional ecology is considered, new species (not necessarily extinct) can be introduced into ecosystem where a species has become functionally extinct before any de-extinction action ever needs to be taken. This can be a key transformative process in ecological preservation and restoration because functional extinction can have cascading effects on the health of an ecosystem. For example, species that engineer ecosystems such as beavers are particularly unique functionally; their absence from an ecosystem could be devastating.

While functional arguments for reintroduction of extinct species may paint thoughtful reintroduction as an ecological boon, the ethical and practical debate over de-extinction has not left functional approaches unscathed. The main critique of functional arguments in favor of de-extinction are largely focused on contentions that ecological functions are often ambiguously defined and that it is unclear what functions must be present to define an ecosystem. These arguments suggest that reintroducing an extinct species could be drastically harm an ecosystem if conclusions about its function or the functions of the species it is intended to replace are incorrect. Additionally, even if an extinct species' function is well understood de-extinction could be equally harmful if the function served by the extinct species is no longer needed by the ecosystem.

== Journals ==
The scientific journal Functional Ecology is published by the British Ecological Society since 1986

== See also ==
- Community ecology
