= Tetrasphaera veronensis =

Scientific classification
- Domain: Bacteria
- Kingdom: Bacillati
- Phylum: Actinomycetota
- Class: Actinomycetes
- Order: Micrococcales
- Family: Intrasporangiaceae
- Genus: Tetrasphaera
- Species: T. veronensis

Binomial name
- Tetrasphaera veronensis McKenzie et al. 2006

Type strain
- DSM 17520; JCM 15592; NCIMB 14129; Ver 1

Synonyms
- "Candidatus Nostocoida limicola" Blackall et al. 2000; "Candidatus Nostocoides limicola" corrig. Blackall et al. 2000

Species of bacterium

Tetrasphaera veronensis is a bacterium species from the genus Tetrasphaera which has been isolated from activated sludge from Verona in Italy.
