= Janibacter corallicola =

Scientific classification
- Domain: Bacteria
- Kingdom: Bacillati
- Phylum: Actinomycetota
- Class: Actinomycetes
- Order: Micrococcales
- Family: Intrasporangiaceae
- Genus: Janibacter
- Species: J. corallicola

Binomial name
- Janibacter corallicola Kageyama et al. 2007

Species of bacterium

Janibacter corallicola is a species of Gram positive, strictly aerobic, bacterium. The species was initially isolated from coral (Acropora gemmifera) in Palau in 2002. The species was first described in 2007, and the species name refers to its original isolation from coral.

The optimum growth temperature for J. corallicola is 23-36 °C, and can grow in the 16-38 °C range. The optimum pH is 6.0-8.0, and can grow in the 5.0-9.0 range.
