= Fodinibacter =

Scientific classification
- Domain: Bacteria
- Kingdom: Bacillati
- Phylum: Actinomycetota
- Class: Actinomycetia
- Order: Micrococcales
- Family: Intrasporangiaceae
- Genus: Fodinibacter; Wang et al. 2009

Type species
- Fodinibacter luteus Wang et al. 2009

Species
- "Candidatus F. communicans" corrig. Bertin et al. 2011; F. luteus Wang et al. 2009

Synonyms
- "Candidatus Fodinabacter" Bertin et al. 2011; "Candidatus Fodinibacter" corrig. Bertin et al. 2011

Genus of bacteria

Fodinibacter is a genus of Gram positive, nonmotile, non-sporeforming bacteria. The bacteria are strictly aerobic and mesophilic. Cells of the genus are irregular rods and grow very poorly in the absence of NaCl. The genus name is derived from the Latin fodina (mine), referring to the salt mine from which the type of species was isolated.

The type species of the genus, Fodinibacter luteus, was originally isolated from a salt mine in Yunnan, China.
