= Janibacter massiliensis =

Scientific classification
- Domain: Bacteria
- Kingdom: Bacillati
- Phylum: Actinomycetota
- Class: Actinomycetia
- Order: Micrococcales
- Family: Intrasporangiaceae
- Genus: Janibacter
- Species: J. massiliensis

Binomial name
- Janibacter massiliensis Maaloum et al. 2019

Species of bacteria

"Janibacter massiliensis" is a species of Gram positive, aerobic, bacterium. The species was initially isolated from the vaginal discharge of a 45-year-old French woman with bacterial vaginosis. The species was first described in 2019, and the species name refers to Massilia, the ancient name for Marseille, the city from which the species was first isolated.

"J. massiliensis" can grow in the 28-37 °C temperature range, and is able to grow at pH 6.5-8.5.
