= J. alkaliphilus =

J. alkaliphilus may refer to:

- Janibacter alkaliphilus , a Gram-positive bacterium
- Jeotgalibacillus alkaliphilus, a Gram-positive bacterium
