= Intrasporangium mesophilum =

Scientific classification
- Domain: Bacteria
- Kingdom: Bacillati
- Phylum: Actinomycetota
- Class: Actinomycetia
- Order: Micrococcales
- Family: Intrasporangiaceae
- Genus: Intrasporangium
- Species: I. mesophilum

Binomial name
- Intrasporangium mesophilum Yang et al. 2012

Species of bacteria

Intrasporangium mesophilum is a species of Gram positive, strictly aerobic bacterium. The species was initially isolated from rhizospheric soil of an oilseed plant, Jatropha curcas. The species was first described in 2012, and its name refers to its mesophilic growth conditions.

The optimum growth temperature for I. mesophilum is 28 °C and can grow in the 20-37 °C range. The species is able to grow in pH 6.0-8.0.
