= Pedococcus soli =

Scientific classification
- Domain: Bacteria
- Kingdom: Bacillati
- Phylum: Actinomycetota
- Class: Actinomycetia
- Order: Micrococcales
- Family: Intrasporangiaceae
- Genus: Pedococcus
- Species: P. soli

Binomial name
- Pedococcus soli (Singh et al. 2015) Nouioui et al. 2018

Synonyms
- Phycicoccus soli Singh 2015

Species of bacteria

Pedococcus soli is a species of Gram positive, strictly aerobic, non-endosporeforming bacterium. The species was initially isolated from soil from Gyeyang Mountain, Incheon, South Korea. The species was first described in 2016, and its name is derived from Latin soli (soil).

The optimum growth temperature for P. soli is 38 °C and can grow in the 10-35 °C range. The optimum pH is 6.5-7.5, and can grow in pH 5.5-8.5.
