= Kribbia dieselivorans =

Scientific classification
- Domain: Bacteria
- Kingdom: Bacillati
- Phylum: Actinomycetota
- Class: Actinomycetia
- Order: Micrococcales
- Family: Intrasporangiaceae
- Genus: Kribbia; Jung et al. 2006
- Species: K. dieselivorans

Binomial name
- Kribbia dieselivorans Jung et al. 2006

Species of bacterium

Kribbia dieselivorans is a species of Gram positive, nonmotile, non-sporeforming bacteria. The bacteria are facultatively anaerobic and mesophilic, and the cells can be irregular rods or coccoid. It was originally isolated from tidal flat sediment collected from Kwangyang, South Korea during a survey for diesel-degrading bacteria. The species name refers to its ability to degrade diesel fuel. K. dieselivorans is the type species of genus Kribbia, and is currently the only species in the genus.

The optimum growth temperature for K. dieselivorans is 30 °C and can grow in the 8-42 °C range. The optimum pH is 6.5-7.5.
