= Tetrasphaera japonica =

Scientific classification
- Domain: Bacteria
- Kingdom: Bacillati
- Phylum: Actinomycetota
- Class: Actinomycetes
- Order: Micrococcales
- Family: Intrasporangiaceae
- Genus: Tetrasphaera
- Species: T. japonica

Binomial name
- Tetrasphaera japonica Maszenan et al. 2000

Type strain
- ACM 5116; DSM 13192; IAM 14891; JCM 21381; NBRC 103088; T1-X7

Species of bacterium

Tetrasphaera japonica is a Gram-positive bacterium species from the genus Tetrasphaera which has been isolated from activated sludge from Japan.
