= Ornithinicoccus halotolerans =

Scientific classification
- Domain: Bacteria
- Kingdom: Bacillati
- Phylum: Actinomycetota
- Class: Actinomycetes
- Order: Micrococcales
- Family: Intrasporangiaceae
- Genus: Ornithinicoccus
- Species: O. halotolerans

Binomial name
- Ornithinicoccus halotolerans Zhang et al. 2016

Type strain
- CGMCC 1.14989; KCTC 39700; EGI 80423

Species of bacterium

Ornithinicoccus halotolerans is a Gram-positive bacterium species from the genus Ornithinicoccus which has been isolated from desert soil from Xinjiang in China.
