= Pedococcus badiiscoriae =

Scientific classification
- Domain: Bacteria
- Kingdom: Bacillati
- Phylum: Actinomycetota
- Class: Actinomycetia
- Order: Micrococcales
- Family: Intrasporangiaceae
- Genus: Pedococcus
- Species: P. badiiscoriae

Binomial name
- Pedococcus badiiscoriae (Lee 2013) Nouioui et al. 2018

Synonyms
- Phycicoccus badiiscoriae Lee 2013

Species of bacteria

Pedococcus badiiscoriae is a species of Gram positive, strictly aerobic, non-endosporeforming bacterium. The species was initially isolated from a brown-coloured layer of scoria collected near a small mountain in Jeju, South Korea. The species was first described in 2013, and its name is derived from Latin badius (brown) and scoriae (of scoria).

The optimum growth temperature for P. badiiscoriae is 30 °C and can grow in the 20-35 °C range. The optimum pH is 8.1-9.1, and can grow in pH 5.1-11.1.
