= Janibacter melonis =

Scientific classification
- Domain: Bacteria
- Kingdom: Bacillati
- Phylum: Actinomycetota
- Class: Actinomycetia
- Order: Micrococcales
- Family: Intrasporangiaceae
- Genus: Janibacter
- Species: J. melonis

Binomial name
- Janibacter melonis Yoon et al. 2004

Species of bacteria

Janibacter melonis is a species of Gram positive, aerobic, bacterium. The species was initially isolated from an abnormally spoiled oriental melon (Cucumis melo). The species was first described in 2004, and the species name refers to the melon from which it was first isolated.

The optimum growth temperature for J. melonis is 28-35 °C, and can grow in the 15-40 °C range. The optimum pH is 7.0-9.0, and can grow at 5.0-11.0.

J. melonis was isolated from a man's bloodstream after receiving treatment for a facial infection. The man had been bitten by an unknown insect. Since the no attempt was made to culture from the infected area, J. melonis may not have caused the infection.
