= P. ginsenosidimutans =

P. ginsenosidimutans may refer to:

- Phycicoccus ginsenosidimutans, a Gram-positive bacterium.
- Pseudobacter ginsenosidimutans, a Gram-negative bacterium of the genus Pseudobacter.
