= Intrasporangium oryzae =

Scientific classification
- Domain: Bacteria
- Kingdom: Bacillati
- Phylum: Actinomycetota
- Class: Actinomycetia
- Order: Micrococcales
- Family: Intrasporangiaceae
- Genus: Intrasporangium
- Species: I. oryzae

Binomial name
- Intrasporangium oryzae (Kageyama et al. 2007) Yang et al. 2012

Synonyms
- Humihabitans oryzae Kageyama et al. 2007

Species of bacteria

Intrasporangium oryzae is a species of Gram positive, strictly aerobic bacterium. The species was initially isolated from rice paddy soil. The species was first described in 2007, and its name is derived from Latin oryzae (of rice). It was originally placed in the novel genus Humihabitans, but further research reclassified the species as a member of the existing genus, Intrasporangium. Because Humihabitans was monospecific, with H. oryzae as the only species, the genus is now defunct.

The same soil survey that discovered I. oryzae also discovered the novel genera/species Oryzihumus leptocrescens and Patulibacter minatonensis.

I. oryzae can grow in the 8-40 °C range and in pH 5.0-11.0.
