= Tetrasphaera jenkinsii =

Scientific classification
- Domain: Bacteria
- Kingdom: Bacillati
- Phylum: Actinomycetota
- Class: Actinomycetes
- Order: Micrococcales
- Family: Intrasporangiaceae
- Genus: Tetrasphaera
- Species: T. jenkinsii

Binomial name
- Tetrasphaera jenkinsii McKenzie et al. 2006

Type strain
- Ben 74; DSM 17519; JCM 15590; NCIMB 14128

Species of bacterium

Tetrasphaera jenkinsii is a bacterium species from the genus Tetrasphaera which has been isolated from activated sludge from Glenelg in Australia.
