= H. oryzae =

H. oryzae may refer to:

- Heterodera oryzae, a plant nematode.
- Hirschmanniella oryzae, a plant nematode.
- Intrasporangium oryzae, (formerly Humihabitans oryzae) a Gram-positive bacterium.
