= Ornithinicoccus hortensis =

Scientific classification
- Domain: Bacteria
- Kingdom: Bacillati
- Phylum: Actinomycetota
- Class: Actinomycetes
- Order: Micrococcales
- Family: Intrasporangiaceae
- Genus: Ornithinicoccus
- Species: O. hortensis

Binomial name
- Ornithinicoccus hortensis Groth et al. 1999

Type strain
- 2115-028; ATCC BAA-9; CCUG 43142; CIP 106364; DSM 12335; HKI 0125; IAM 14900; IFO 16434; INBRC 16434T; JCM 11538; NBRC 16434; NCIMB 13613

Species of bacterium

Ornithinicoccus hortensis is a Gram-positive bacterium species from the genus Ornithinicoccus which has been isolated from garden soil from Gießen in Germany.
