= Intrasporangium flavum =

Scientific classification
- Domain: Bacteria
- Kingdom: Bacillati
- Phylum: Actinomycetota
- Class: Actinomycetes
- Order: Micrococcales
- Family: Intrasporangiaceae
- Genus: Intrasporangium
- Species: I. flavum

Binomial name
- Intrasporangium flavum (Azman et al. 2016) Nouioui et al. 2018

Type strain
- DSM 29621; MCCC 1K00454; MUSC 78; NBRC 110749

Synonyms
- Monashia flava Azman et al. 2016

Species of bacteria

Intrasporangium flavum is a species of Gram positive bacteria.
