= Pedococcus aerophilus =

Scientific classification
- Domain: Bacteria
- Kingdom: Bacillati
- Phylum: Actinomycetota
- Class: Actinomycetia
- Order: Micrococcales
- Family: Intrasporangiaceae
- Genus: Pedococcus
- Species: P. aerophilus

Binomial name
- Pedococcus aerophilus (Weon et al. 2008) Nouioui et al. 2018

Synonyms
- Phycicoccus aerophilus Weon et al. 2008

Species of bacteria

Pedococcus aerophilus is a species of Gram positive, strictly aerobic, non-endosporeforming bacterium. The species was initially isolated from air sampled in Taean County, South Korea. The species was first described in 2008, and its name is derived from Greek aer (air) and philos (loving), referring to its initial isolation from an air sample.

The optimum growth temperature for P. aerophilus is 30 °C and can grow in the 5-37 °C range. The optimum pH is 6.0-7.0, and can grow in pH 5.0-9.0.
