= Ornithinibacter aureus =

Scientific classification
- Domain: Bacteria
- Kingdom: Bacillati
- Phylum: Actinomycetota
- Class: Actinomycetia
- Order: Micrococcales
- Family: Intrasporangiaceae
- Genus: Ornithinibacter; Xiao et al. 2011
- Species: O. aureus

Binomial name
- Ornithinibacter aureus Xiao et al. 2011

Species of bacterium

Ornithinibacter aureus is a species of Gram positive, nonmotile, non-sporeforming bacteria. The bacteria are aerobic and mesophilic, and the cells are irregular rods that form branching hyphae. The species was first described in 2011, and it was originally isolated from surface seawater collected from the South China Sea. The species name is derived from Latin aureus (golden), referring to the yellow-pigmented colonies that form on R2A agar. O. aureus is the type species of genus Ornithinibacter, and is currently the only species in the genus.

The optimum growth temperature for O. aureus is 34 °C and can grow in the 4-45 °C range. The optimum pH is 7.2, and can grow in pH 5.0-10.2. and the species can tolerate NaCl salt concentrations of up to 5%. Cells form yellow-pigmented colonies on agar.
