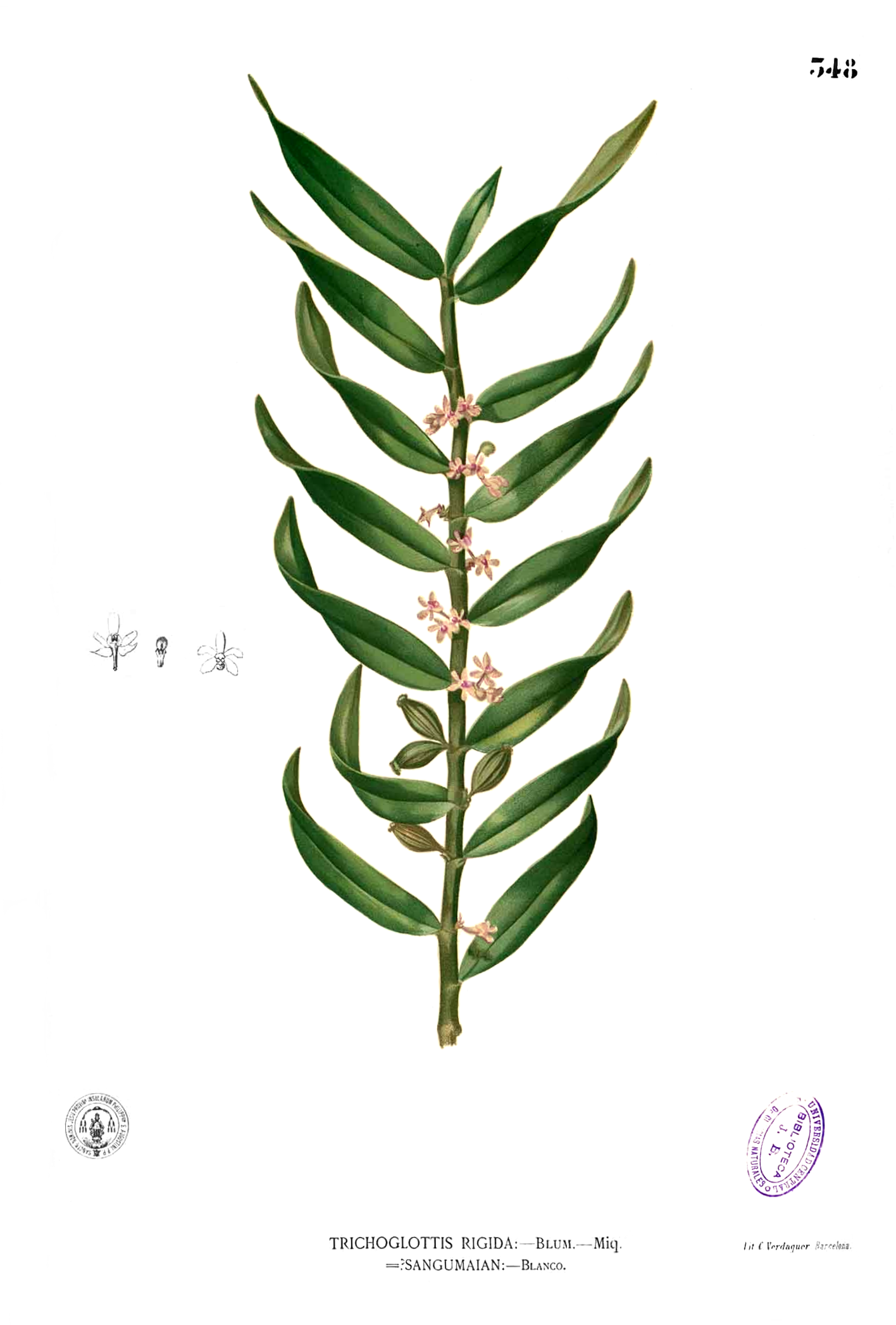
- Illustration of T. rigida by Francisco Manuel Blanco

Scientific classification
- Kingdom: Plantae
- Clade: Tracheophytes
- Clade: Angiosperms
- Clade: Monocots
- Order: Asparagales
- Family: Orchidaceae
- Subfamily: Epidendroideae
- Tribe: Vandeae
- Subtribe: Aeridinae
- Genus: Trichoglottis; Blume

Type species
- Trichoglottis retusa Blume

Synonyms
- Atrichoglottis (Endl.) Wittst.; Ceratochilus Blume; Sarothrochilus Schltr.; Staurochilus Ridl. ex Pfitzer; Stauropsis Rchb.f.; Synptera Llanos; Ventricularia Garay

= Trichoglottis =

Genus of orchid

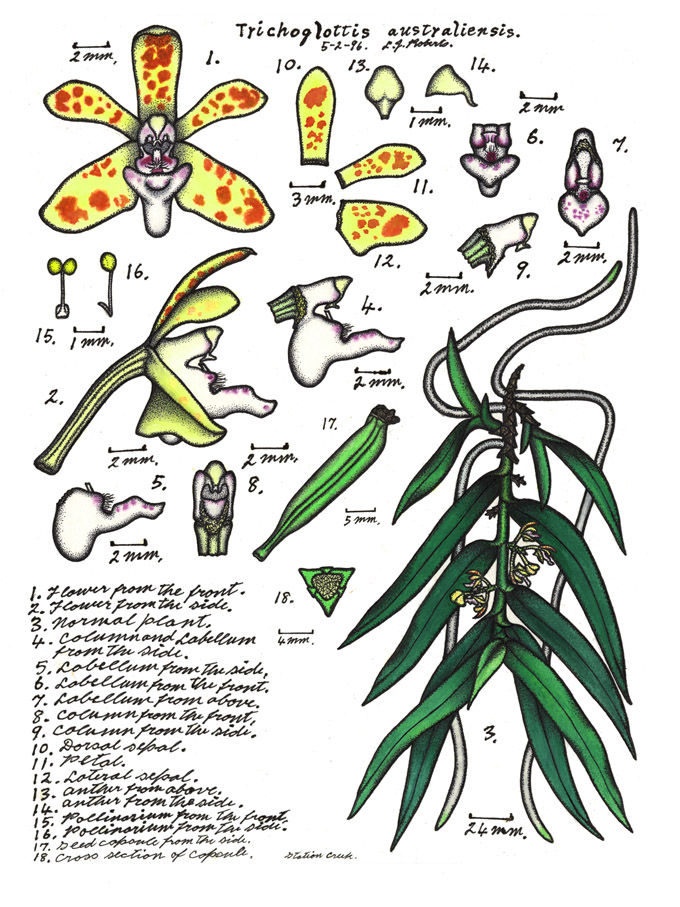
Illustration of T. australiensis by Lewis Roberts

Trichoglottis, commonly known as cherub orchids or 毛舌兰属 (mao she lan shu), is a genus of flowering plants in the family Orchidaceae. Orchids in this genus are epiphytic plants with thick roots, relatively thick, fibrous stems and many large, thick, leathery leaves arranged in two ranks. The flowers are usually small and yellowish with light brown or purple markings. The flowers have broad sepals, narrower petals and a labellum which has three lobes and is often hairy. There are about 85 species distributed from tropical and subtropical Asia to the north-western Pacific. Most species grow in rainforest.

== Description ==
Orchids in the genus Trichoglottis are epiphytic or climbing herbs with a monopodial habit, thick roots and straggly or pendulous stems. There are many large, leathery linear to elliptic leaves arranged in two ranks with their bases sheathing the stems. From one to a few relatively small flowers are arranged on flowering stems arising from leaf axils. The flowers are resupinate and commonly yellowish with light brown or purple markings. They tend to be produced sporadically throughout the year and last for about a week. The sepals are free and subsimilar. The petals are also free from each other and slightly shorter than the sepals. The labellum is fixed rigidly to the column, fleshy, pubescent or hairy, formed by three lobes and features a sac or spur.

== Taxonomy and naming ==
The genus Trichoglottis was first formally described in 1825 by Carl Ludwig Blume and the description was published in Bijdragen tot de flora van Nederlandsch Indië.

The name Trichoglottis means "hair tongue", and refers to the type species' pubescent labellum.

=== Ceratochilus ===
In 2014, Kocyan and Schuiteman moved the former monotypic genus Ceratochilus into Trichoglottis. The sole species of Ceratochilus, C. biglandulosus, is endemic to the island of Java in Indonesia. Though Ceratochilus was never considered to be closely related to Trichoglottis, molecular analysis strongly supported its position as sister to T. pusilla. Rather than excluding T. pusilla, the authors merged Ceratochilus with Trichoglottis.

=== Species list ===
The following is a list of species of Trichoglottis accepted by Plants of the World Online as of May 2024:

- Trichoglottis acutifolia Ridl.
- Trichoglottis adnata J.J.Sm.
- Trichoglottis agusanensis Ames & Quisumb.
- Trichoglottis amesiana L.O.Williams
- Trichoglottis angusta J.J.Sm.
- Trichoglottis apoensis T.Hashim.
- Trichoglottis atropurpurea Rchb.f.
- Trichoglottis australiensis Dockrill
- Trichoglottis biglandulosa (Blume) Kocyan & Schuit.
- Trichoglottis bimae Rchb.f.
- Trichoglottis bipenicillata J.J.Sm.
- Trichoglottis bipunctata (C.S.P.Parish & Rchb.f.) Tang & F.T.Wang (1951).
- Trichoglottis borneensis (J.J.Wood) Kocyan & Schuit.
- Trichoglottis brachystachya (Kraenzl.) Garay
- Trichoglottis calcarata Ridl.
- Trichoglottis calochila L.O.Williams
- Trichoglottis canhii Aver.
- Trichoglottis celebica Rolfe
- Trichoglottis chrysochila (Kraenzl.) Ormerod & Cootes
- Trichoglottis collenetteae J.J.Wood, C.L.Chan & A.L.Lamb
- Trichoglottis corazoniae Naive & J.C.Matyr
- Trichoglottis crociaria Seidenf.
- Trichoglottis cuneilabris Carr
- Trichoglottis cypriana P.O'Byrne, Gokusing & J.J.Wood
- Trichoglottis dawsoniana (Rchb.f.) Rchb.f.
- Trichoglottis fasciata Rchb.f.
- Trichoglottis geminata (Teijsm. & Binn.) J.J.Sm.
- Trichoglottis gibbosicalcar (Seidenf.) Senghas in F.R.R.Schlechter
- Trichoglottis granulata Ridl.
- Trichoglottis guibertii (Linden & Rchb.f.) Rchb.f.
- Trichoglottis hastatiloba J.J.Wood & A.L.Lamb
- Trichoglottis ionosma (Lindl.) J.J.Sm.
- Trichoglottis javanica J.J.Sm.
- Trichoglottis jiewhoei J.J.Wood, A.L.Lamb & C.L.Chan
- Trichoglottis kenchungianum P.O'Byrne & Gokusing
- Trichoglottis kinabaluensis Rolfe
- Trichoglottis koordersii Rolfe
- Trichoglottis lanceolaria Blume
- Trichoglottis lasioglossa (Schltr.) Ormerod
- Trichoglottis latisepala Ames
- Trichoglottis ledermannii Schltr.
- Trichoglottis littoralis Schltr.
- Trichoglottis lobifera J.J.Sm.
- Trichoglottis loheriana (Kraenzl.) L.O.Williams
- Trichoglottis longifolia Atthan., C.Bandara, N.L.Bandara & Kumar
- Trichoglottis lorata (Rolfe ex Downie) Schuit.
- Trichoglottis lowderiana Choltco
- Trichoglottis luchuensis (Rolfe) Garay & H.R.Sweet
- Trichoglottis luwuensis P.O'Byrne & J.J.Verm.
- Trichoglottis luzonensis Ames
- Trichoglottis maculata (J.J.Sm.) J.J.Sm.
- Trichoglottis magnicallosa Ames & C.Schweinf. in O.Ames
- Trichoglottis mimica L.O.Williams
- Trichoglottis mindanaensis Ames
- Trichoglottis najibii Yudistira & Mustaqim
- Trichoglottis odoratissima Garay
- Trichoglottis orchidea (J.Koenig) Garay
- Trichoglottis paniculata J.J.Sm.
- Trichoglottis pantherina J.J.Sm.
- Trichoglottis papuana Schltr.
- Trichoglottis pauciflora J.J.Sm.
- Trichoglottis persicina P.O'Byrne
- Trichoglottis philippinensis Lindl.
- Trichoglottis punctata Ridl.
- Trichoglottis pusilla (Teijsm. & Binn.) Rchb.f.
- Trichoglottis quadriga Atthan., C.Bandara, Peiris & Kumar
- Trichoglottis ramosa (Lindl.) Senghas in F.R.R.Schlechter
- Trichoglottis retusa Blume
- Trichoglottis rigida Blume
- Trichoglottis rosea (Lindl.) Ames in E.D.Merrill
- Trichoglottis scandens J.J.Sm.
- Trichoglottis scaphigera Ridl.
- Trichoglottis seidenfadenii Aver.
- Trichoglottis simplex J.J.Sm.
- Trichoglottis sitihasmahae J.J.Wood & A.L.Lamb
- Trichoglottis smithii Carr
- Trichoglottis subviolacea (Llanos) Merr.
- Trichoglottis tamesisii Quisumb. & C.Schweinf.
- Trichoglottis tenera (Lindl.) Rchb.f.
- Trichoglottis tenuis Ames & C.Schweinf. in O.Ames
- Trichoglottis tinekeae Schuit.
- Trichoglottis tricostata J.J.Sm.
- Trichoglottis triflora (Guillaumin) Garay & Seidenf.
- Trichoglottis uexkuelliana J.J.Sm.
- Trichoglottis valida Ridl.
- Trichoglottis vandiflora J.J.Sm.
- Trichoglottis ventricularis Kocyan & Schuit.
- Trichoglottis winkleri J.J.Sm.
  - Trichoglottis winkleri var. minor J.J.Sm.
  - Trichoglottis winkleri var. winkleri
- Trichoglottis zollingeriana (Kraenzl.) J.J.Sm.

=== New species ===
Two new species have been described, but not accepted by Plants of the World Online as of 10 September 2023:

- Trichoglottis najibii (Kalimantan, Indonesia);
- Trichoglottis quadriga (Sri Lanka).

== Distribution and habitat ==
Orchids in the genus Trichoglottis are found in China, Taiwan, Assam, Bangladesh, the Indian subcontinent, Sri Lanka, the Andaman Islands, Cambodia, Laos, Myanmar, the Nicobar Islands, Thailand, Vietnam, Borneo, Java, the Lesser Sunda Islands, Malaysia, the Maluku Islands, the Philippines, Sulawesi, Sumatra, the Bismarck Archipelago, New Guinea the Solomon Islands, Queensland (Australia), the Caroline Islands and Palau. Most species grow in rainforest.

== Gallery ==
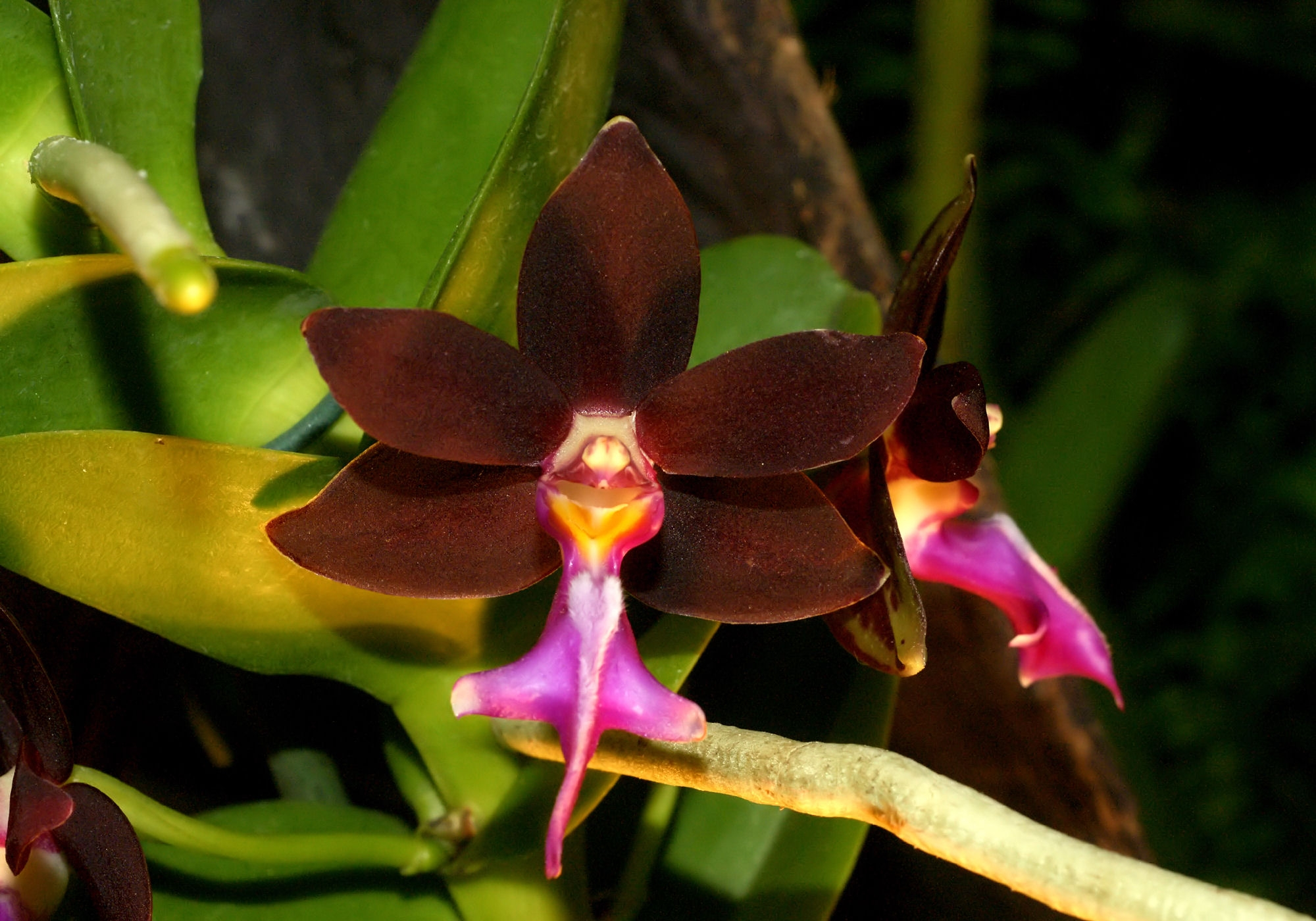
Trichoglottis atropurpurea

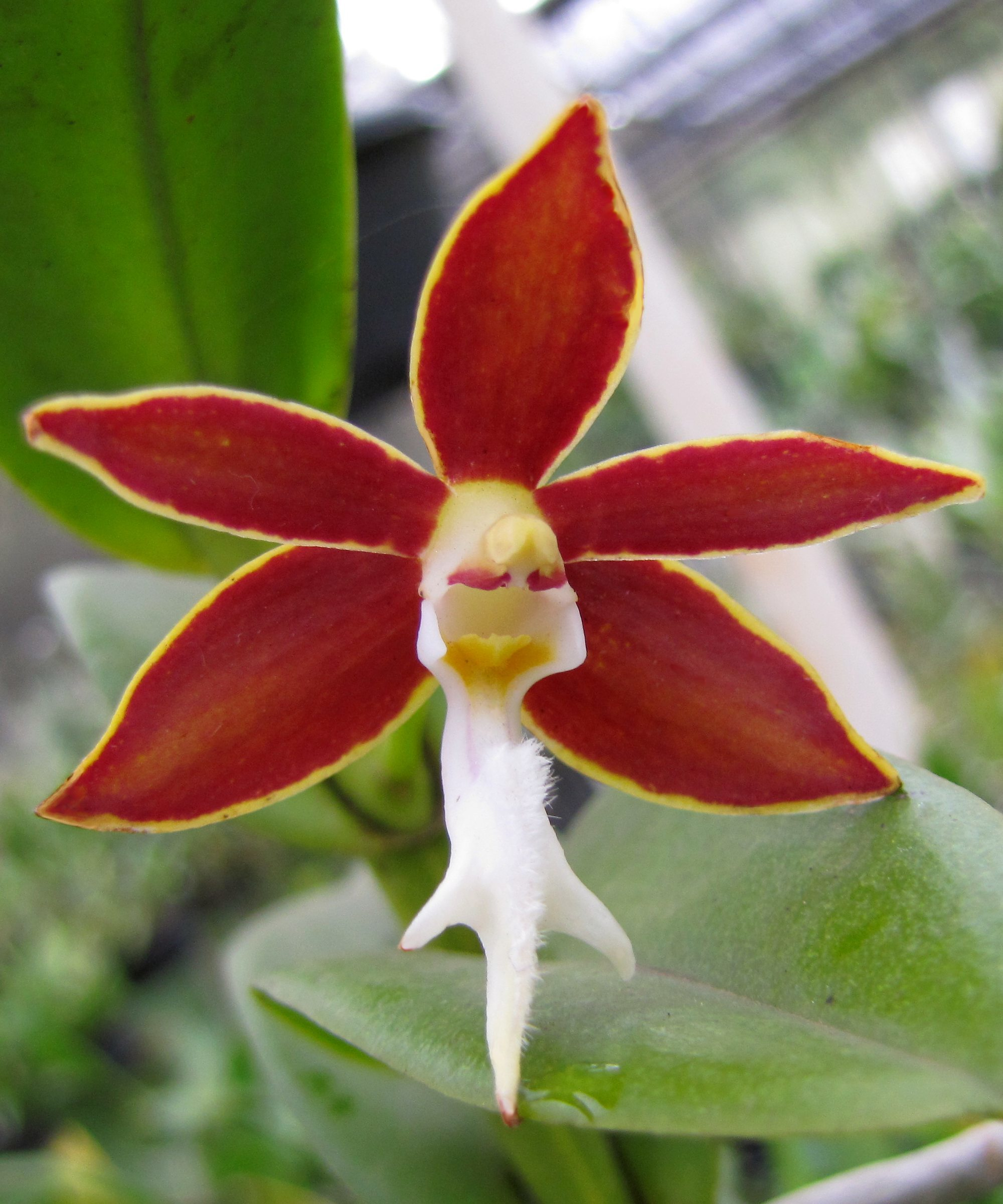
Trichoglottis philippinensis

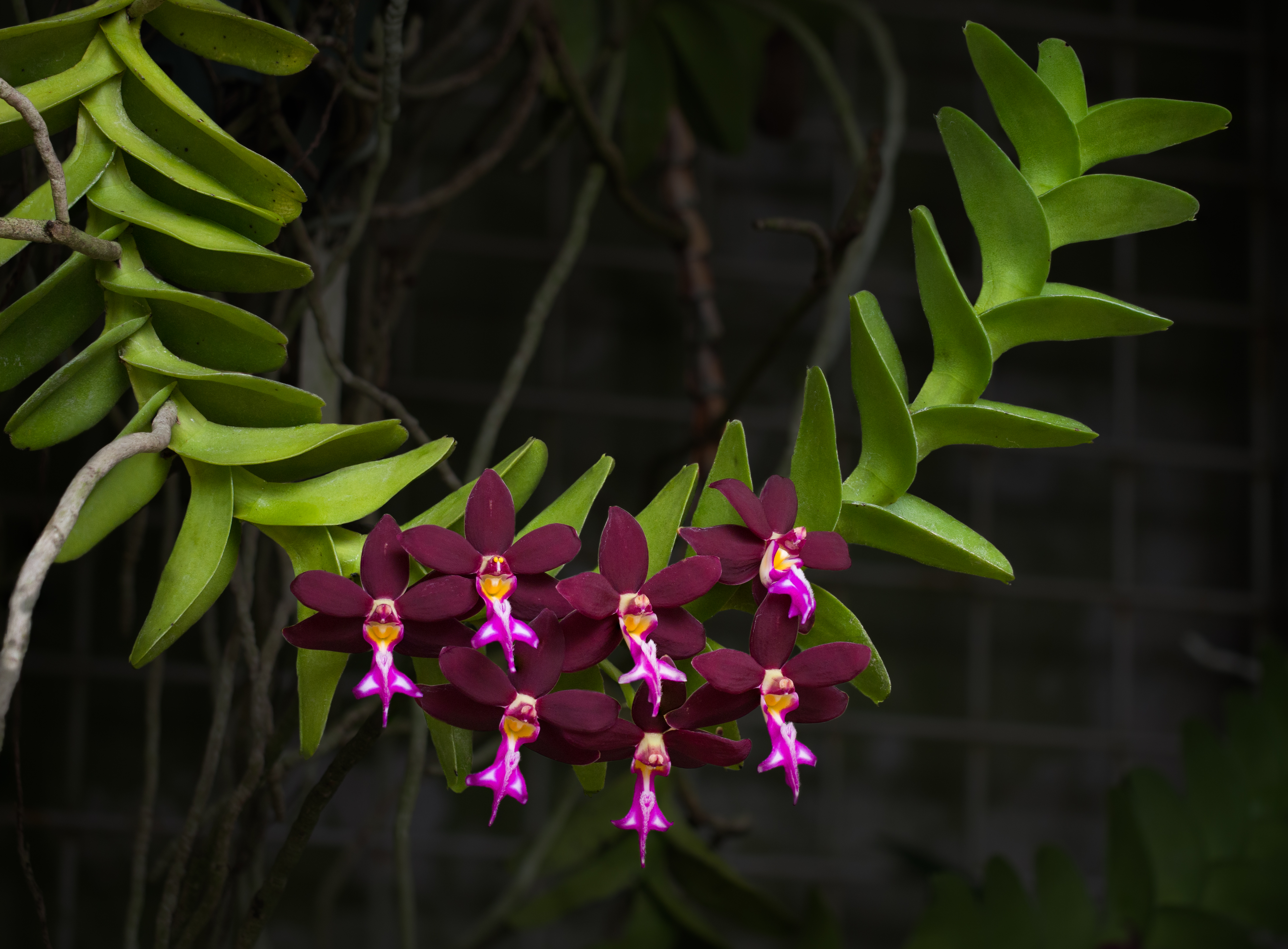
Trichoglottis atropurpurea
