= Trichoglottis mindanaensis =

Scientific classification
- Kingdom: Plantae
- Clade: Tracheophytes
- Clade: Angiosperms
- Clade: Monocots
- Order: Asparagales
- Family: Orchidaceae
- Subfamily: Epidendroideae
- Genus: Trichoglottis
- Species: T. mindanaensis

Binomial name
- Trichoglottis mindanaensis Ames (1914)

Synonyms
- Trichoglottis mindanaensis f. lutea Agoo (2006)

Species of orchid

Trichoglottis mindanaensis is a species of epiphytic orchid endemic to the Philippines growing at elevations of 60 to 1,500 meters above sea level. The species was first found on trees overhanging a tidal stream on the island of Mindanao in the Zamboanga peninsula, hence the specific epithet. The orchid is widely distributed throughout the Philippine archipelago and can also be found in the islands of Luzon, Panay and Samar.
