= Rubellimicrobium aerolatum =

Scientific classification
- Domain: Bacteria
- Kingdom: Pseudomonadati
- Phylum: Pseudomonadota
- Class: Alphaproteobacteria
- Order: Rhodobacterales
- Family: Rhodobacteraceae
- Genus: Rubellimicrobium
- Species: R. aerolatum

Binomial name
- Rubellimicrobium aerolatum Weon et al. 2009

Type strain
- 5715S-9, DSM 19297, KACC 12504

Species of bacterium

Rubellimicrobium aerolatum is a Gram-negative, strictly aerobic and non-spore-forming bacterium from the genus of Rubellimicrobium which has been isolated from air from Suwon in Korea.
