= Oryzihumus =

Scientific classification
- Domain: Bacteria
- Kingdom: Bacillati
- Phylum: Actinomycetota
- Class: Actinomycetes
- Order: Micrococcales
- Family: Intrasporangiaceae
- Genus: Oryzihumus; Kageyama et al. 2005

Type species
- Oryzihumus leptocrescens Kageyama et al. 2005

Species
- O. leptocrescens Kageyama et al. 2005; O. soli Kim et al. 2017; O. terrae Lim et al. 2014

Genus of bacteria

Oryzihumus is a Gram-positive, aerobic and non-motile bacterial genus from the family Intrasporangiaceae.
