= Ornithinicoccus =

Scientific classification
- Domain: Bacteria
- Kingdom: Bacillati
- Phylum: Actinomycetota
- Class: Actinomycetes
- Order: Micrococcales
- Family: Intrasporangiaceae
- Genus: Ornithinicoccus; Groth et al. 1999

Type species
- Ornithinicoccus hortensis Groth et al. 1999

Species
- O. halotolerans Zhang et al. 2016; O. hortensis Groth et al. 1999; O. soli Jiang et al. 2020

Genus of bacteria

Ornithinicoccus is a Gram-positive and non-motile bacterial genus from the family Intrasporangiaceae.
