= Phycicoccus endophyticus =

Scientific classification
- Domain: Bacteria
- Kingdom: Bacillati
- Phylum: Actinomycetota
- Class: Actinomycetia
- Order: Micrococcales
- Family: Intrasporangiaceae
- Genus: Phycicoccus
- Species: P. endophyticus

Binomial name
- Phycicoccus endophyticus Liu 2016

Species of bacteria

Phycicoccus endophyticus is a species of Gram positive, strictly aerobic, non-endospore-forming bacterium. The species was initially isolated from surface sterilized bark of a black mangrove tree (Bruguiera gymnorhiza) collected from Zhanjiang Mangrove Forest National Nature Reserve in Guangdong, China. The species was first described in 2016, and its name refers to the endophytic nature of the organism.

The optimum growth temperature for P. endophyticus is 37 °C and can grow in the 20-42 °C range. The optimum pH is 7.0, and can grow in pH 6.0-9.0. Also, the species can grow in the presence of up to 8.0% NaCl salt concentrations.
