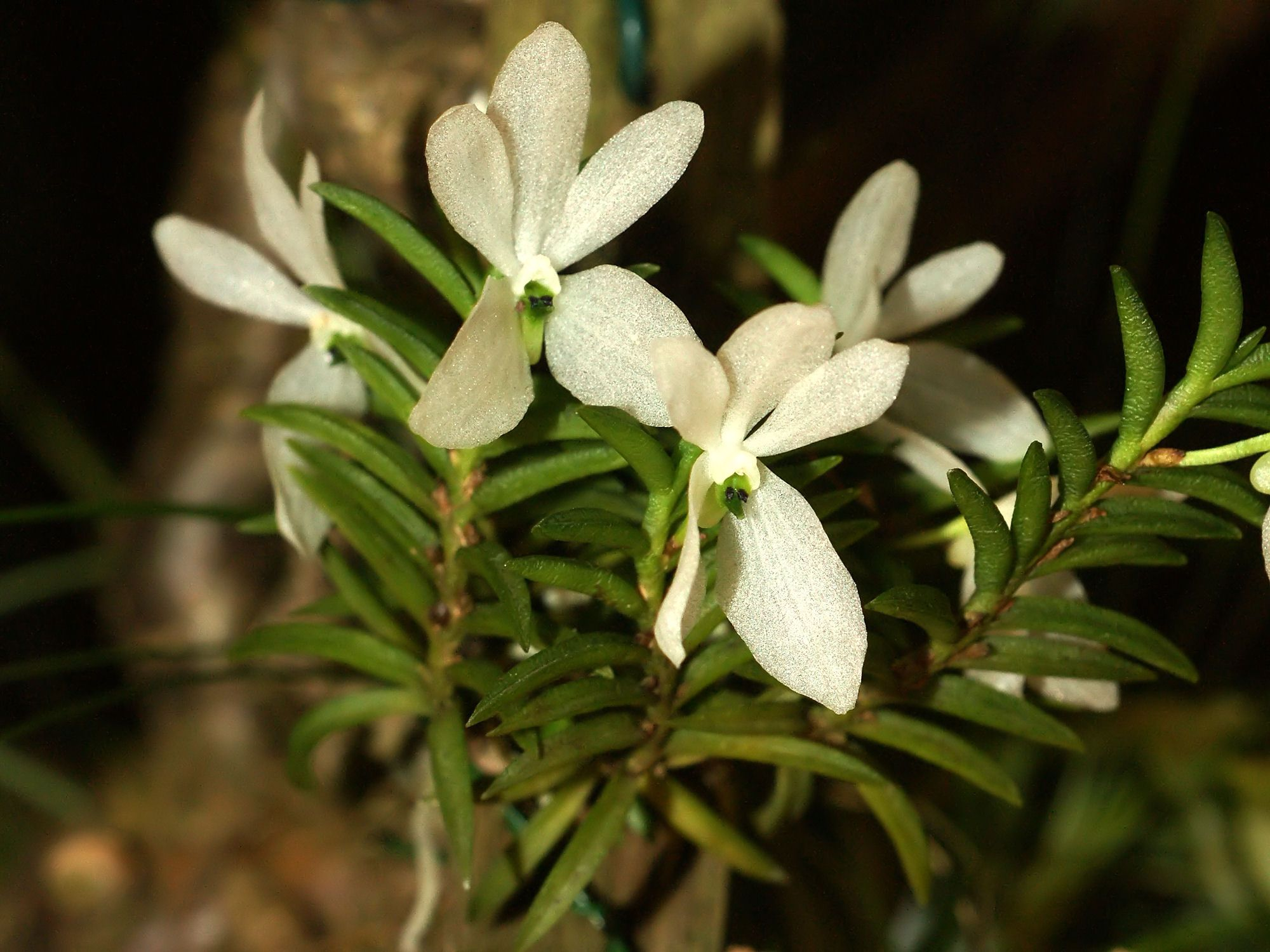

Scientific classification
- Kingdom: Plantae
- Clade: Tracheophytes
- Clade: Angiosperms
- Clade: Monocots
- Order: Asparagales
- Family: Orchidaceae
- Subfamily: Epidendroideae
- Genus: Trichoglottis
- Species: T. biglandulosa

Binomial name
- Trichoglottis biglandulosa (Blume) Kocyan and Schuit.

Synonyms
- Ceratochilus biglandulosus Blume; Gastrochilus biglandulosus (Blume) Kuntze

= Trichoglottis biglandulosa =

Genus of orchid plant

Trichoglottis biglandulosa is a species of flowering plant from the orchid family, Orchidaceae. It is endemic to the island of Java in Indonesia. It is part of the monopodial subtribe Aeridinae and bears nearly white flowers that are proportionally large compared to the rest of the plant.

== Description ==
Trichoglottis biglandulosa is a very small epiphytic herb with a fibrous root system. Its leaves are arranged alternately and are thick, and linear-lanceolate. The inflorescence is unbranching, and the flowers are pedunculate and almost white. The sepals and petals are unfused, spreading, and minutely clawed, with the interior slightly more narrow. The labellum is small, with a slight compressed pouch towards the base. Behind the opening of pouch is a two-lobed callus. The lip is completely fused with the column. The column is short, broad, blunt, and spreading-erect, with the anther distal. The pollinia are globose, connected by a thin elastic stalk, to which they are fixed by the center. The plant blooms from April to July.

== Distribution and habitat ==
Trichoglottis biglandulosa is endemic to the island of Java. It grows at rather high elevations in montane forests. At the time of its publication, it was reported from Mount Gede and Mount Salak.

== Taxonomy and naming ==
Trichoglottis biglandulosa was first described by Carl Ludwig Blume in 1825 as Ceratochilus biglandulosus. The taxon Gastrochilus biglandulosus was subsequently synonymized with T. biglandulosa in 1891 by Kuntze. In 2014, Kocyan and Schuiteman moved the former monotypic genus Ceratochilus into Trichoglottis. Though Ceratochilus was never considered to be closely related to Trichoglottis, molecular analysis strongly supported its position as sister to T. pusilla. Rather than excluding T. pusilla, the authors merged Ceratochilus with Trichoglottis.
