= Janibacter alkaliphilus =

Scientific classification
- Domain: Bacteria
- Kingdom: Bacillati
- Phylum: Actinomycetota
- Class: Actinomycetes
- Order: Micrococcales
- Family: Intrasporangiaceae
- Genus: Janibacter
- Species: J. alkaliphilus

Binomial name
- Janibacter alkaliphilus Li et al. 2012

Type strain
- CCTCC AB 2011027; DSM 24723; SCSIO 10480

Species of bacterium

Janibacter alkaliphilus is a bacterium from the genus Janibacter which has been isolated from the coral Anthogorgia from China.
