= Rubellimicrobium =

Scientific classification
- Domain: Bacteria
- Kingdom: Pseudomonadati
- Phylum: Pseudomonadota
- Class: Alphaproteobacteria
- Order: Rhodobacterales
- Family: Rhodobacteraceae
- Genus: Rubellimicrobium; Denner et al. 2006

Type species
- Rubellimicrobium thermophilum

Species
- R. aerolatum R. mesophilum R. roseum R. thermophilum

Genus of bacteria

Rubellimicrobium is a genus of bacteria from the family of Rhodobacteraceae.
