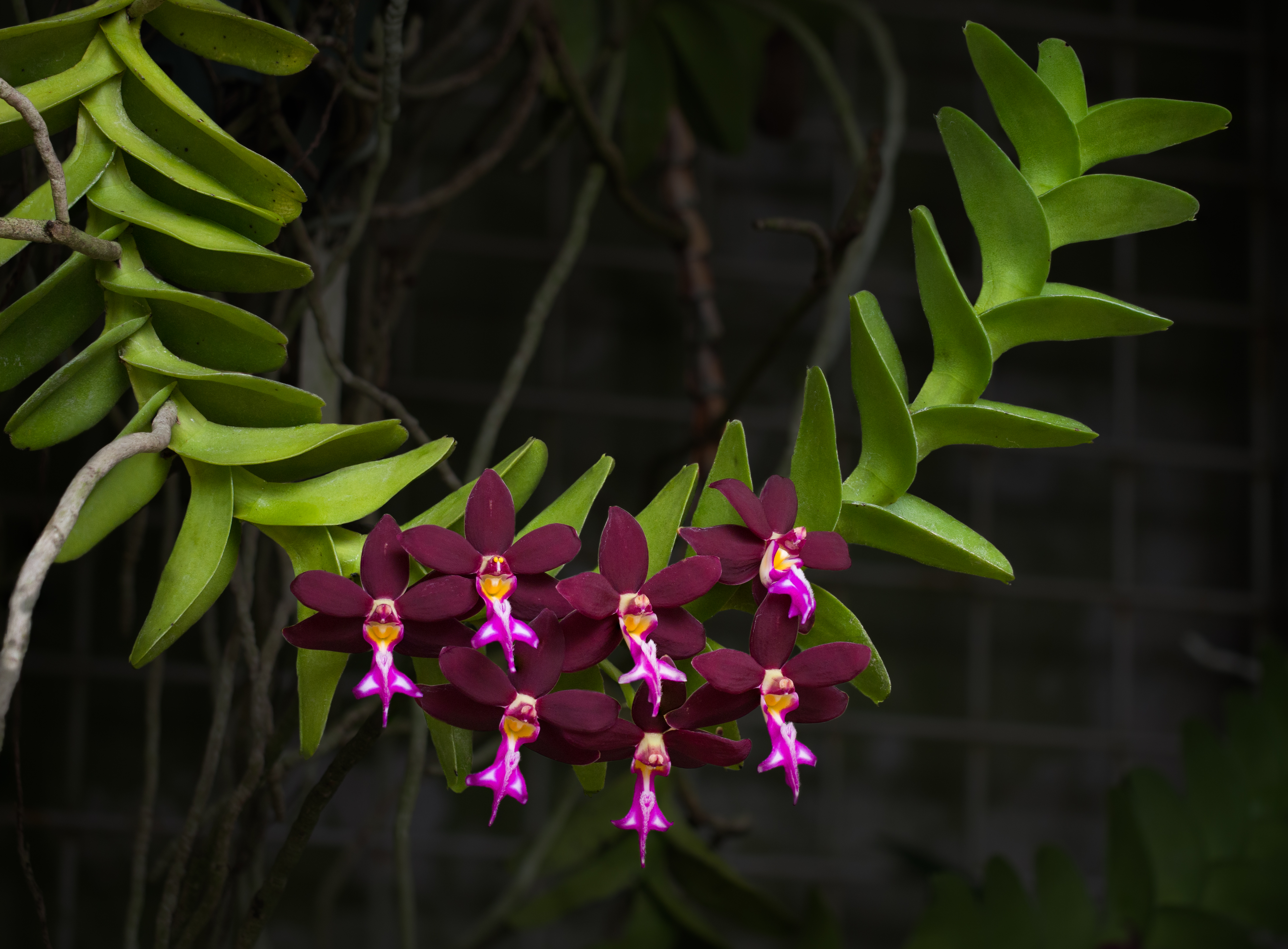
- Trichoglottis atropurpurea, the Dark Purple Trichoglottis

Scientific classification
- Kingdom: Plantae
- Clade: Tracheophytes
- Clade: Angiosperms
- Clade: Monocots
- Order: Asparagales
- Family: Orchidaceae
- Subfamily: Epidendroideae
- Genus: Trichoglottis
- Species: T. atropurpurea

Binomial name
- Trichoglottis atropurpurea Rchb.f (1877)
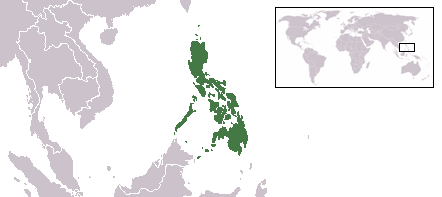
- distribution of Trichoglottis atropurpurea

Synonyms
- Stauropsis philippinensis var. brachiata Ames & Quisumb. (1933); Trichoglottis bicruris Kraenzl. (1916); Trichoglottis brachiata Ames (1922); Trichoglottis philippinensis var. brachiata (Ames) L.O.Williams (1938)

= Trichoglottis atropurpurea =

Dark purple trichoglottis

Species of plant

Trichoglottis atropurpurea, the dark purple trichoglottis, is a species of orchid endemic to the Philippines. This hot to warm growing epiphyte was first found growing in mangrove swamps in the islands of Biliran, Catanduanes, Mindanao (Agusan del Sur and Davao) and Polillo. The plant shares the same appearance with T. philippinensis except for the rich dark color of the blooms and slight variation of the perianth. This species was first described in 1877 by the German botanist Heinrich Gustav Reichenbach, an expert on the orchid family. At that time, thousands of newly discovered orchids were being sent back to Europe, and he was responsible for identifying, describing and classifying many of these new discoveries.

== Description ==
Trichoglottis atropurpurea is a fairly large epiphytic species of orchid, with stems reaching 30 to 60 cm (12 to 24 in) long. Fleshy white roots grow out of the stems which are leafy towards the tip. The leaves, which overlap and semi-clasp the stem are oblong or oblong-ovate and slightly keeled. They are 3 to 8 cm (1.2 to 3.1 in) long and 2.5 to 4 cm (1.0 to 1.6 in) wide. The inflorescence grows from the leaf axil and bears one or two fleshy, fragrant flowers, up to 4.5 cm (1.8 in) in diameter. The five tepals are some shade of dark reddish-purple, and the hairy, lobed, lip is white with purple streaks and a splash of yellow near the base.

== Gallery ==
Photos of Trichoglottis atropurpurea

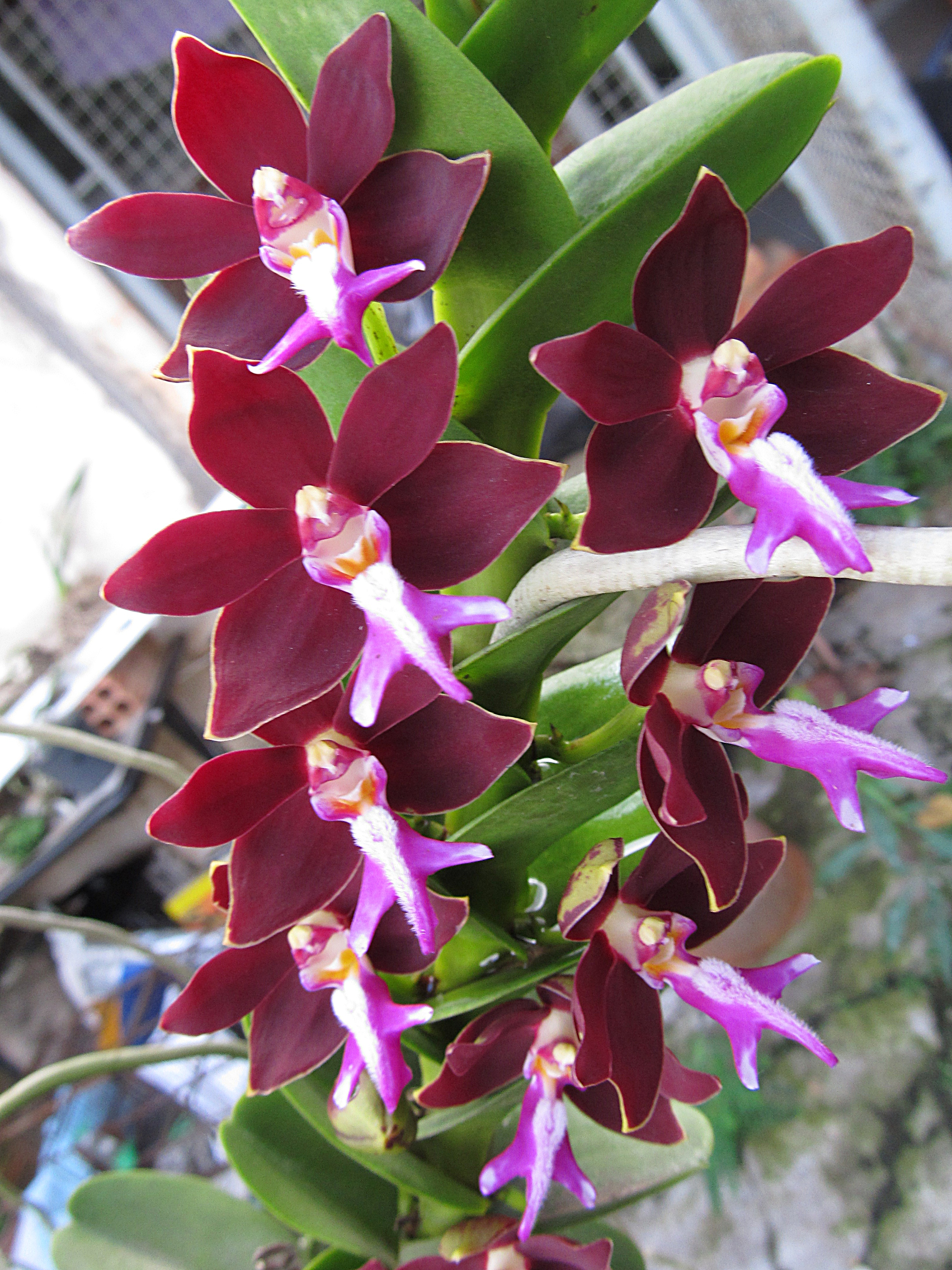
Trichoglottis atropurpurea
flower

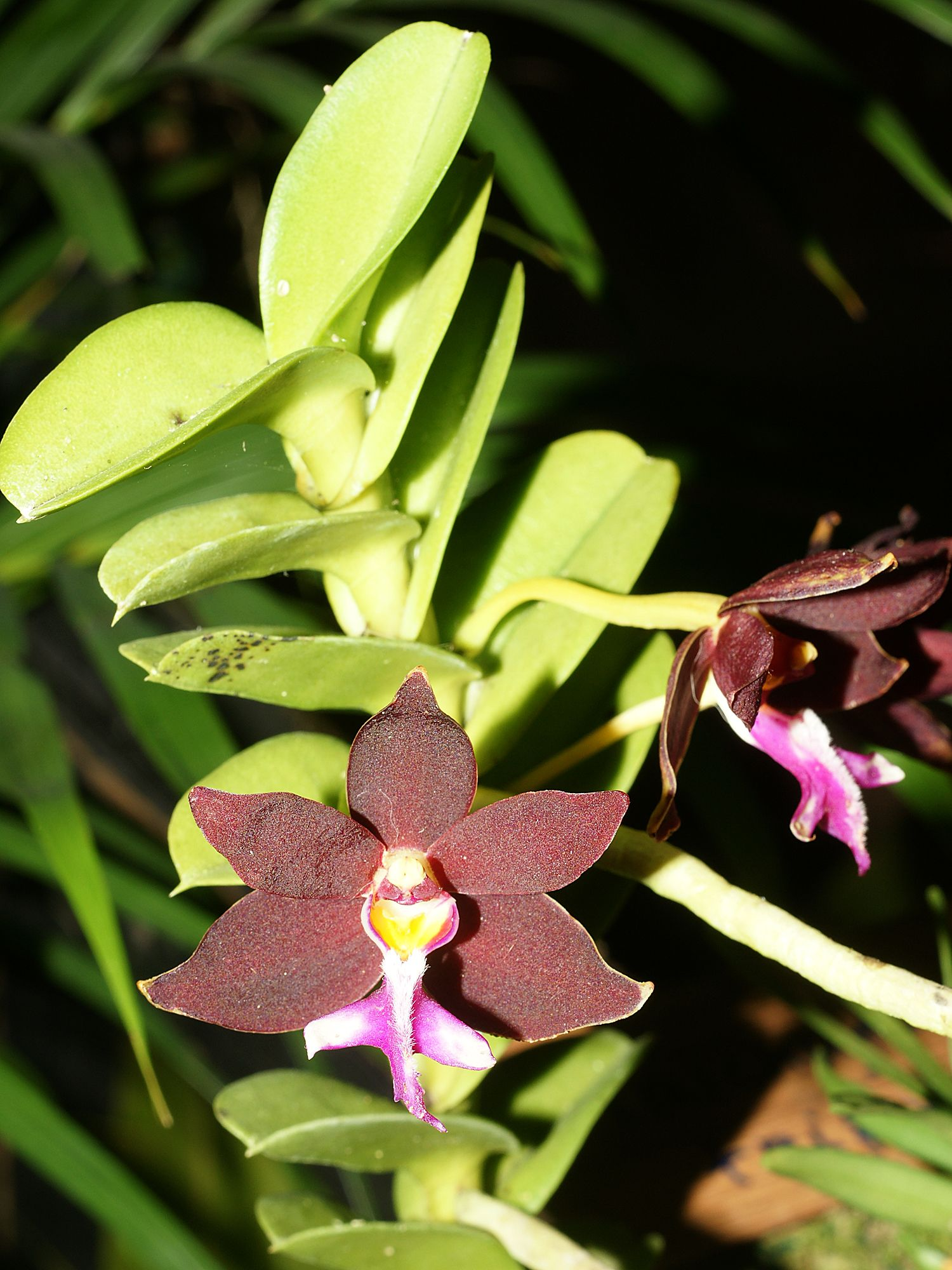
Trichoglottis atropurpurea
habitus
