= Phycicoccus jejuensis =

Scientific classification
- Domain: Bacteria
- Kingdom: Bacillati
- Phylum: Actinomycetota
- Class: Actinomycetia
- Order: Micrococcales
- Family: Intrasporangiaceae
- Genus: Phycicoccus
- Species: P. jejuensis

Binomial name
- Phycicoccus jejuensis Lee 2006

Species of bacteria

Phycicoccus jejuensis is a species of Gram positive, strictly aerobic, non-motile, non-endospore-forming bacterium. The species was initially isolated from a dried seaweed sample collected from a sandy beach in Jeju Province, South Korea. The species was first described in 2006, and its name refers to the province from which it was first isolated. P. jejuensis was the first species in the genus Phycicoccus, and is the type species for the genus.

The optimum growth temperature for P. jejuensis is 30 °C and can grow in the 4-37 °C range. The optimum pH is 7.1, and can grow in pH 5.1-10.1.
