= Rubellimicrobium thermophilum =

Scientific classification
- Domain: Bacteria
- Kingdom: Pseudomonadati
- Phylum: Pseudomonadota
- Class: Alphaproteobacteria
- Order: Rhodobacterales
- Family: Rhodobacteraceae
- Genus: Rubellimicrobium
- Species: R. thermophilum

Binomial name
- Rubellimicrobium thermophilum Denner et al. 2006

Type strain
- C-lvkR2A-2, CCUG 51817, CIP 109278, DSM 16684, HAMBI 2421

Species of bacterium

Rubellimicrobium thermophilum is a strictly aerobic and moderately thermophilic bacterium from the genus of Rubellimicrobium.
