= Tetrasphaera =

Scientific classification
- Domain: Bacteria
- Kingdom: Bacillati
- Phylum: Actinomycetota
- Class: Actinomycetes
- Order: Micrococcales
- Family: Intrasporangiaceae
- Genus: Tetrasphaera; Maszenan et al. 2000

Type species
- Tetrasphaera japonica Maszenan et al. 2000

Species
- T. australiensis Maszenan et al. 2000; T. japonica Maszenan et al. 2000; T. jenkinsii McKenzie et al. 2006; T. vanveenii McKenzie et al. 2006; T. veronensis McKenzie et al. 2006

Synonyms
- "Candidatus Nostocoides" corrig. Blackall et al. 2000; "Candidatus Nostocoida" Blackall et al. 2000

Genus of bacteria

Tetrasphaera is a bacterial genus from the family Intrasporangiaceae.
