= Janibacter =

Scientific classification
- Domain: Bacteria
- Kingdom: Bacillati
- Phylum: Actinomycetota
- Class: Actinomycetia
- Order: Micrococcales
- Family: Intrasporangiaceae
- Genus: Janibacter; Martin et al. 1997

Type species
- Janibacter limosus Martin et al. 1997

Species
- J. alkaliphilus Li et al. 2012; J. anophelis Kämpfer et al. 2006; J. corallicola Kageyama et al. 2007; J. cremeus Hamada et al. 2013; "J. endophyticus" Zhang et al. 2022; J. hoylei Shivaji et al. 2009; J. indicus Zhang et al. 2014; J. limosus Martin et al. 1997; "J. massiliensis" Maaloum et al. 2019; J. melonis Yoon et al. 2004; J. terrae Yoon et al. 2000

Genus of bacteria

Janibacter is a genus of Gram positive, nonmotile, non-sporeforming bacteria. The genus name is derived from the two-faced Roman god Janus, referring to the fact that the cells of the original strain could be rod-shaped or coccoid.

The type species of the genus, Janibacter limosus, was originally isolated from sludge from a wastewater treatment plant. Other species have been isolated from an air sample, a melon, the midgut of mosquitoes, coral, sea sediment, and hydrothermal sediment. Janibacter brevis was originally classified as a separate species, but was later found to be a heterotypic synonym of J. terrae.

Colonies formed on agar by members of this genus are usually cream, white, or yellow pigmented. The optimum temperature for most Janibacter species is 28 °C. The lowest temperature required for growth in the genus is 4 °C (J. terrae, J. anophelis, J. limosus), and the highest is 45 °C (J. terrae, J. anophelis, J. corallicola). The pH optimum is commonly between 7.0 and 9.0, with some species capable of growing at 5.0-12.0. All species can tolerate NaCl salt concentrations up to 7%, but J. alkaliphilus can tolerate concentrations of 17%. J. hoylei, which was recovered from high altitude air samples, is the most UV resistant.

Janibacter species have been implicated in multiple cases of human infection, although most cases appeared to be opportunistic infections. An unnamed Janibacter species caused an infection in a man with acute myeloid leukemia after receiving a bone marrow transplant. J. melonis infected a man's face after being bitten by an unknown insect. J. terrae infected four immunocompromised patients, resulting in two deaths, and also caused a psoas abscess that was difficult to diagnose due to the infrequency of Janibacter infections. An 8-week-old infant was found to be infected with J. hoylei, but was successfully treated with vancomycin. "J. massiliensis" was isolated from the vaginal discharge of a woman with bacterial vaginosis.
