= Rubellimicrobium mesophilum =

Scientific classification
- Domain: Bacteria
- Kingdom: Pseudomonadati
- Phylum: Pseudomonadota
- Class: Alphaproteobacteria
- Order: Rhodobacterales
- Family: Rhodobacteraceae
- Genus: Rubellimicrobium
- Species: R. mesophilum

Binomial name
- Rubellimicrobium mesophilum Dastager et al. 2008

Type strain
- DSM 19309, KCTC 22012, MSL-20

Species of bacterium

Rubellimicrobium mesophilum is a Gram-negative, mesophilic and motile bacterium from the genus of Rubellimicrobium which has been isolated from soil from Bigeum Island in Korea.
