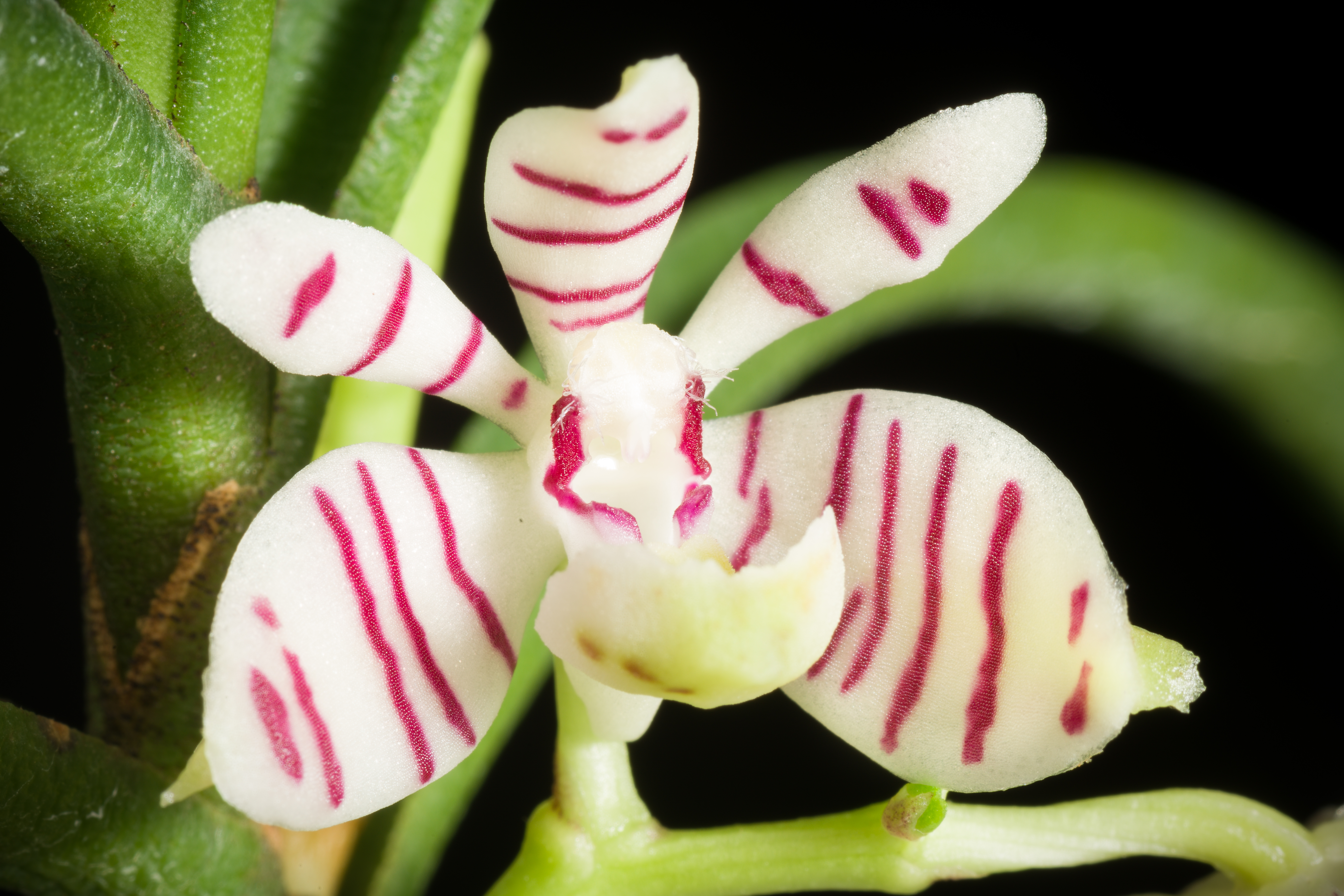
- flower detail

Scientific classification
- Kingdom: Plantae
- Clade: Tracheophytes
- Clade: Angiosperms
- Clade: Monocots
- Order: Asparagales
- Family: Orchidaceae
- Subfamily: Epidendroideae
- Genus: Trichoglottis
- Species: T. pusilla

Binomial name
- Trichoglottis pusilla (Teijsm. & Binn.) Rchb.f.
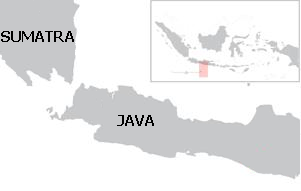
- distribution of Trichoglottis pusilla

Synonyms
- Trichoglottis cochlearis Rchb.f.; Trichoglottis pusilla f. fatoviciana Choltco; Vanda pusilla Teijsm. & Binn.

= Trichoglottis pusilla =

Species of epiphytic orchid

Trichoglottis pusilla is a species of miniature epiphyte in the family Orchidaceae, native to the islands Java and Sumatra of Indonesia. A short stem bears oblong, fleshy leaves. Two flowers with red lines are produced on racemes. The labellum is obovate and fleshy. The specific epithet pusilla, meaning small or tiny, refers to this species diminutive size.

== Conservation ==
The IUCN has not assessed this species conservation status. It is however protected unter the CITES appendix II regulations of international trade.

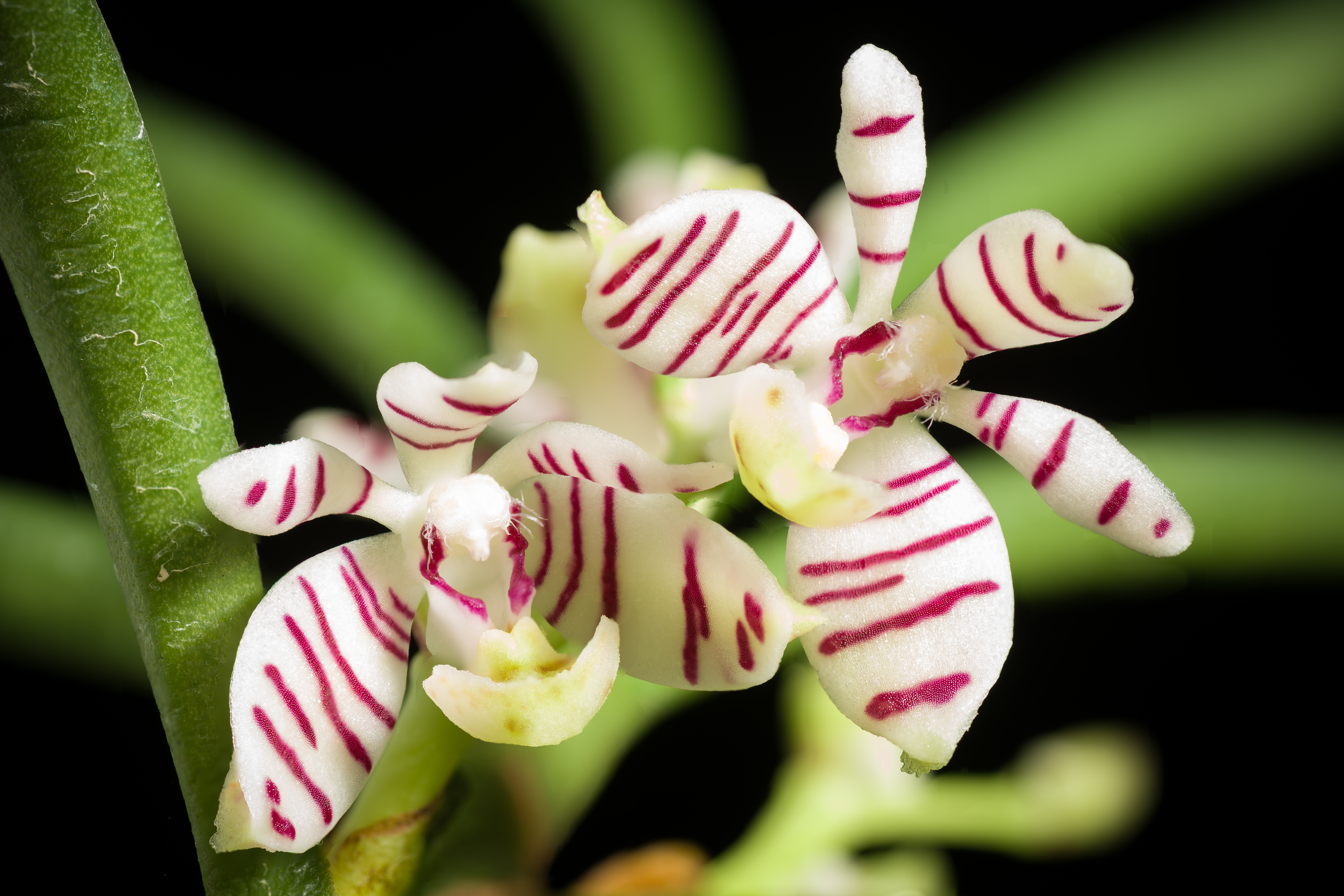

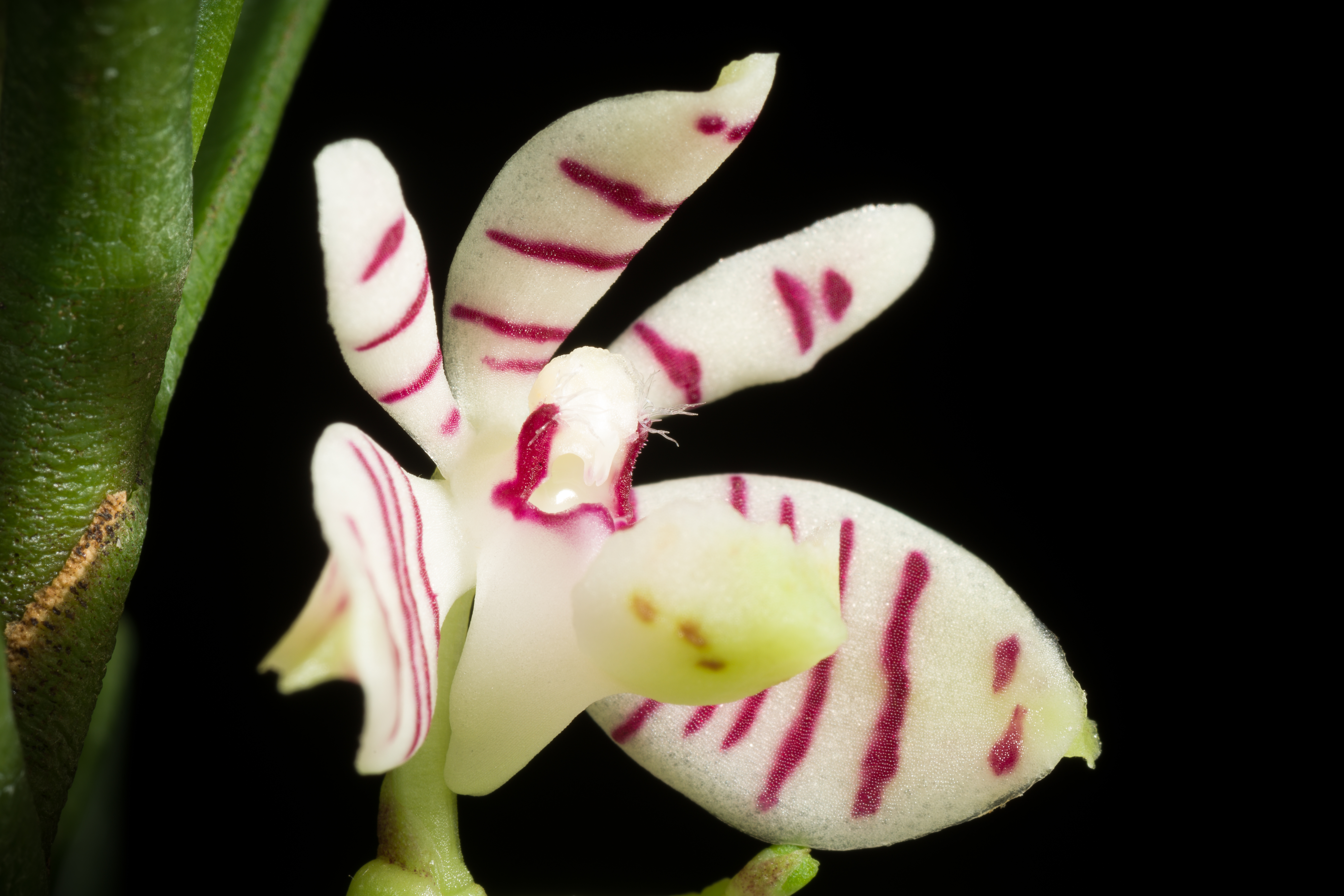

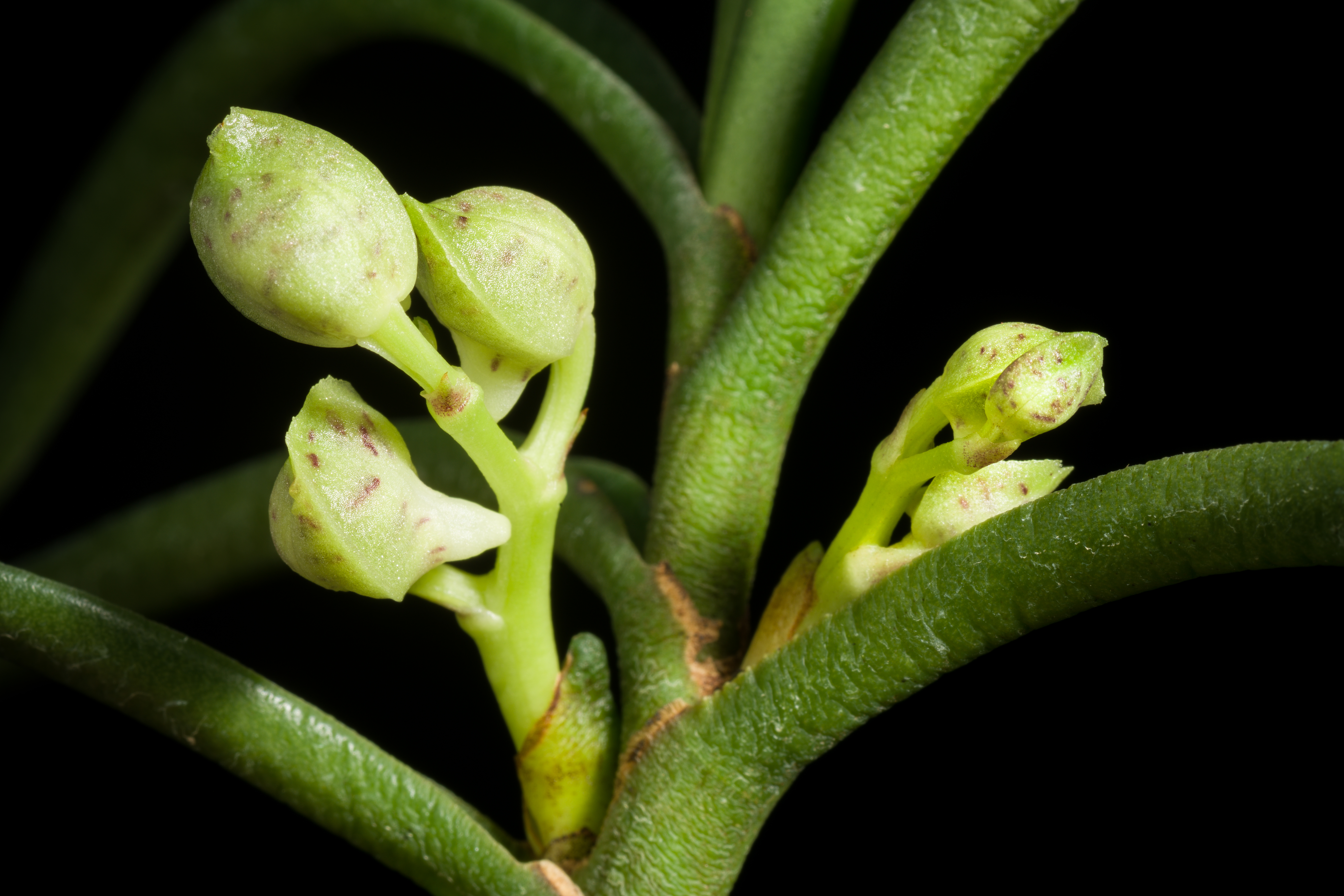

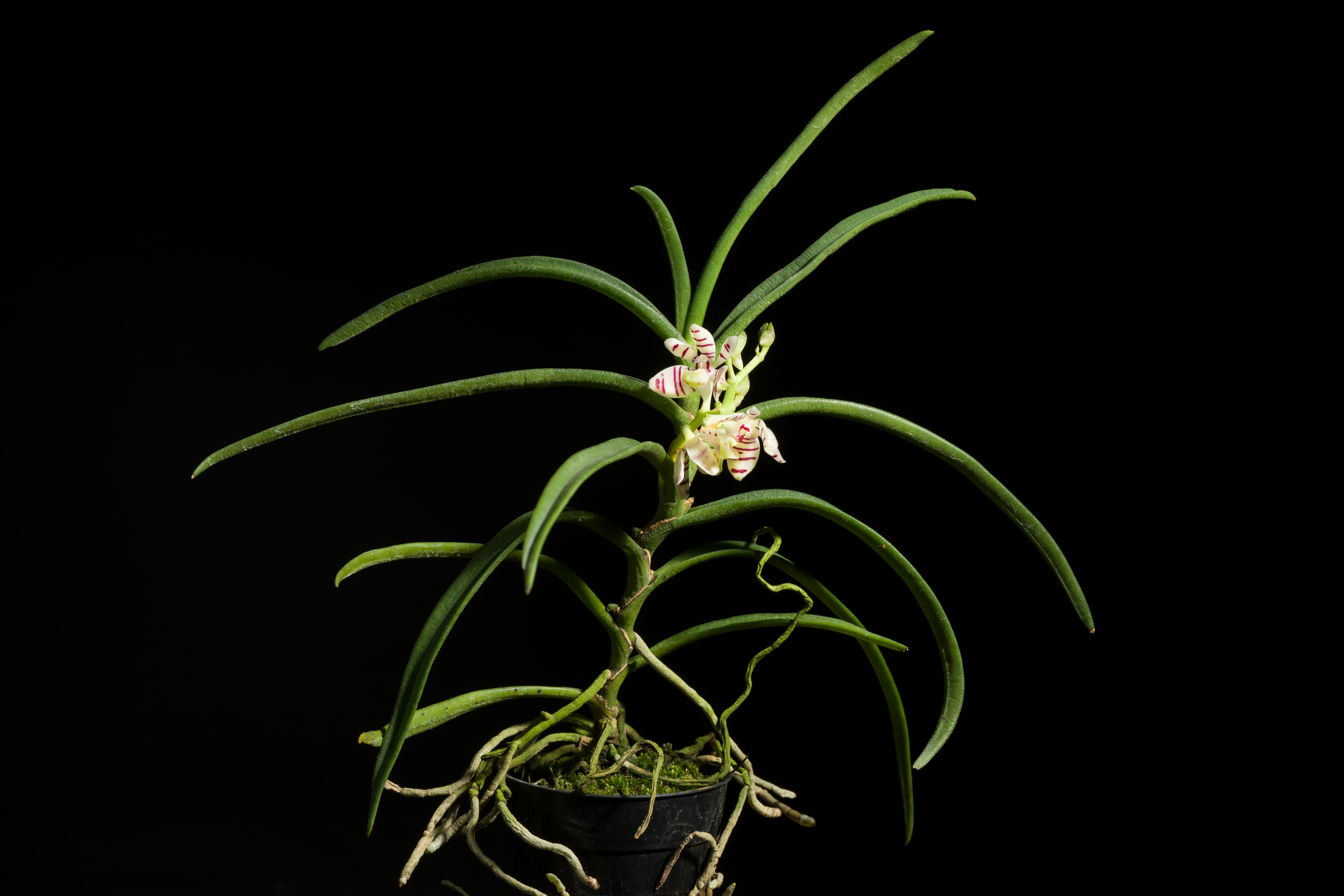
