= Oryzihumus leptocrescens =

Scientific classification
- Domain: Bacteria
- Kingdom: Bacillati
- Phylum: Actinomycetota
- Class: Actinomycetes
- Order: Micrococcales
- Family: Intrasporangiaceae
- Genus: Oryzihumus
- Species: O. leptocrescens

Binomial name
- Oryzihumus leptocrescens Kageyama et al. 2005

Type strain
- JCM 12835; NBRC 100762; NRRL B-24347; KV-628; KV-641; KV-656

Species of bacterium

Oryzihumus leptocrescens is a Gram-positive bacterium species from the genus of Oryzihumus which has been isolated from soil from Japan.
