= Rubellimicrobium roseum =

Scientific classification
- Domain: Bacteria
- Kingdom: Pseudomonadati
- Phylum: Pseudomonadota
- Class: Alphaproteobacteria
- Order: Rhodobacterales
- Family: Rhodobacteraceae
- Genus: Rubellimicrobium
- Species: R. roseum

Binomial name
- Rubellimicrobium roseum Cao et al. 2013

Type strain
- CCTCC AA 208029, DSM 23580, KCTC 23202

Species of bacterium

Rubellimicrobium roseum is a Gram-negative, non-spore-forming and non-motile bacterium from the genus of Rubellimicrobium which has been isolated from forest soil from the Yunnan province in China.
