= Pedococcus ginsenosidimutans =

Scientific classification
- Domain: Bacteria
- Kingdom: Bacillati
- Phylum: Actinomycetota
- Class: Actinomycetia
- Order: Micrococcales
- Family: Intrasporangiaceae
- Genus: Pedococcus
- Species: P. ginsenosidimutans

Binomial name
- Pedococcus ginsenosidimutans (Wang et al. 2011) Nouioui et al. 2018

Synonyms
- Phycicoccus ginsenosidimutans Wang et al. 2011

Species of bacteria

Pedococcus ginsenosidimutans is a species of Gram positive, strictly aerobic, non-endosporeforming bacterium. The species was initially isolated from soil from a ginseng field from Paektu Mountain, Jinlin District, China. The species was first described in 2016, and its name refers to the species ability to convert ginsenoside.

The optimum growth temperature for P. ginsenosidimutans is 30 °C and can grow in the 10-37 °C range. The optimum pH is 6.5-7.5, and can grow in pH 5.0-10.
