= Tetrasphaera australiensis =

Scientific classification
- Domain: Bacteria
- Kingdom: Bacillati
- Phylum: Actinomycetota
- Class: Actinomycetes
- Order: Micrococcales
- Family: Intrasporangiaceae
- Genus: Tetrasphaera
- Species: T. australiensis

Binomial name
- Tetrasphaera australiensis Maszenan et al. 2000

Type strain
- ACM 5117; Ben 109; DSM 12890; Glenelg; IAM 14901; JCM 21391; NBRC 103087

Species of bacterium

Tetrasphaera australiensis is a Gram-positive bacterium species from the genus Tetrasphaera which has been isolated from activated sludge from Glenelg in Australia.
