= Marihabitans asiaticum =

Scientific classification
- Domain: Bacteria
- Kingdom: Bacillati
- Phylum: Actinomycetota
- Class: Actinomycetia
- Order: Micrococcales
- Family: Intrasporangiaceae
- Genus: Marihabitans; Kageyama et al. 2008
- Species: M. asiaticum

Binomial name
- Marihabitans asiaticum Kageyama et al. 2008

Species of bacterium

Marihabitans asiaticum is a species of Gram positive, nonmotile, non-sporeforming bacteria. The bacteria are aerobic and mesophilic, and the cells are irregular rods or coccoid. The species was first described in 2008, and it was originally isolated in 2003 from surface seawater collected at the Kesennuma ferry port in Miyagi Prefecture, Japan. The species name refers to the region (Asia) from which it was first isolated. M. asiaticum is the type species of genus Marihabitans, and is currently the only species in the genus.

The growth temperature range for Marihabitans asiaticum is 18-34 °C. The optimum pH is 9.0, and the species can tolerate NaCl salt concentrations of up to 7%. Cells form yellow-pigmented colonies on agar.
