= Intrasporangium =

Scientific classification
- Domain: Bacteria
- Kingdom: Bacillati
- Phylum: Actinomycetota
- Class: Actinomycetes
- Order: Micrococcales
- Family: Intrasporangiaceae
- Genus: Intrasporangium; Kalakoutskii et al. 1967 (Approved Lists 1980)

Species
- I. calvum Kalakoutskii et al. 1967 (Approved Lists 1980); I. chromatireducens Liu et al. 2012; I. flavum (Azman et al. 2016) Nouioui et al. 2018; I. mesophilum Yang et al. 2012; I. oryzae (Kageyama et al. 2007) Yang et al. 2012

Synonyms
- Humihabitans Kageyama et al. 2007; Monashia Azman et al. 2016

Genus of bacteria

Intrasporangium is a genus of Gram positive, nonmotile bacteria. The genus name refers to the mycelium of the type strain forming intercalary vesicles that were originally identified as spores. However, no spores have been observed in later studies. The family Intrasporangiaceae is named after the genus, and Intrasporangium is the type genus for the family.

The genus was first proposed in 1967. The type species I. calvum was first isolated from air in a school dining room in the Soviet Union. The genus was monospecific until 2012, when three species were added to the genus. I. chromatireducens and I. mesophilum were proposed as new species, and the monospecific Humihabitans oryzae was reclassified as I. oryzae. The novel genus and species Monashia flava was proposed in 2016, but was later found to be a member of Intrasporagium, most likely a strain of I. oryzae. The genus is currently defunct.

Although the first isolation of Intrasporangium was from an air sample, subsequent isolations have mainly been from various types of soil. The soil sources include a manganese mine, a former coal gasification site, a uranium-contanimated site, and the rhizospheres of a rice paddy and of Jatropha curcas.
