= Intrasporangium calvum =

Scientific classification
- Domain: Bacteria
- Kingdom: Bacillati
- Phylum: Actinomycetota
- Class: Actinomycetes
- Order: Micrococcales
- Family: Intrasporangiaceae
- Genus: Intrasporangium
- Species: I. calvum

Binomial name
- Intrasporangium calvum Kalakoutskii et al. 1967

Species of bacteria

Intrasporangium calvum is a species of Gram positive, aerobic bacteria. The species was initially isolated from air in a school dining room in the Soviet Union. The species was first described in 1967, and was the first and only species in the genus Intrasporangium until 2012.

I. calvum can grow in the 20-40 °C range, and can grow in pH 6.0-8.0. The genus name refers to the mycelium of the type strain forming intercalary vesicles that were originally identified as spores. However, no spores have been observed in later studies.
