= Janibacter terrae =

Scientific classification
- Domain: Bacteria
- Kingdom: Bacillati
- Phylum: Actinomycetota
- Class: Actinomycetes
- Order: Micrococcales
- Family: Intrasporangiaceae
- Genus: Janibacter
- Species: J. terrae

Binomial name
- Janibacter terrae Yoon et al. 2000

Type strain
- ATCC BAA-130; CCUG 45369; CIP 107018; CS12; DSM 13876; JCM 10705; KCCM 80001; KCTC 19953; NBRC 107842

Synonyms
- Janibacter brevis Imamura et al. 2000

Species of bacteria

Janibacter terrae is a bacterium from the genus Janibacter which has been isolated from soil in Korea. Janibacter terrae is able to degrade trichloroethylene. Janibacter brevis was originally classified as its own species, but was later found to be a heterotypic synonym of J. terrae.
