= Pedococcus =

Scientific classification
- Domain: Bacteria
- Kingdom: Bacillati
- Phylum: Actinomycetota
- Class: Actinomycetia
- Order: Micrococcales
- Family: Intrasporangiaceae
- Genus: Pedococcus; Nouioui et al. 2018

Type species
- Pedococcus dokdonensis (Yoon et al. 2008) Nouioui et al. 2018

Species
- P. aerophilus (Weon et al. 2008) Nouioui et al. 2018; P. badiiscoriae (Lee 2013) Nouioui et al. 2018; P. bigeumensis (Dastager et al. 2008) Nouioui et al. 2018; P. cremeus (Zhang et al. 2011) Nouioui et al. 2018; P. dokdonensis (Yoon et al. 2008) Nouioui et al. 2018; P. ginsenosidimutans (Wang et al. 2011) Nouioui et al. 2018; P. soli (Singh et al. 2015) Nouioui et al. 2018

Genus of bacteria

Pedococcus is a genus of gram positive, aerobic, non-endosporeforming bacteria.
