= Reverse ecology =

Reverse ecology refers to the use of genomics and systems-level analysis of biological networks to study or predict an organism's ecology, including habitats, species interactions, environmental requirements, and adaptation patterns. Unlike forward ecological genomics, it starts from genomic or network data and uses them to infer ecological traits or units. The term was suggested in 2007 by Matthew Rockman during a conference on ecological genomics in Christchurch, New Zealand. Rockman was drawing an analogy to the term reverse genetics in which gene function is studied by comparing the phenotypic effects of different genetic sequences of that gene.

Most researchers employing reverse ecology make use of some sort of population genomics and computational biology method, including BioPython and R. This requires that a genome scan is performed on multiple individuals from at least two populations in order to identify genomic regions or sites that show signs of selection. These genome scans can utilize single nucleotide polymorphism (SNP) markers, microsatellites can work as well.

== Methodology ==
Reverse ecology has been used by researchers to understand environments and other ecological traits of organisms on Earth using genomic approaches. By examining the genes of bacteria, scientists are able to reconstruct the organisms' native environment, either today or even from millions of years ago. These predictions can include growth temperature, pH, metabolism, and other growth characteristics. The data could help us understand key events in the history of life on Earth.

In metabolic-network applications, reverse ecology treats seed metabolites as externally acquired compounds that connect an organism's metabolism to its environment, allowing researchers to predict environmental requirements from network topology. In microbial population genomics, genomic and gene-flow patterns can be used to predict ecologically and genetically cohesive units, which are then checked against environmental metadata or experiments.

In 2011, researchers at the University of California, Berkeley were able to demonstrate that one can determine an organism's adaptive traits by looking first at its genome and checking for variations across a population.

== See also ==
- Thermophile
- Mesophile
- GC content
