= Joculator brevis =

Scientific classification
- Kingdom: Animalia
- Phylum: Mollusca
- Class: Gastropoda
- Subclass: Caenogastropoda
- Order: incertae sedis
- Family: Cerithiopsidae
- Genus: Joculator
- Species: J. brevis

Binomial name
- Joculator brevis Cecalupo & Perugia, 2012

Species of gastropod

Joculator brevis is a species of minute sea snail, a marine gastropod mollusc in the family Cerithiopsidae. This species was described by Cecalupo and Perugia in 2012.
