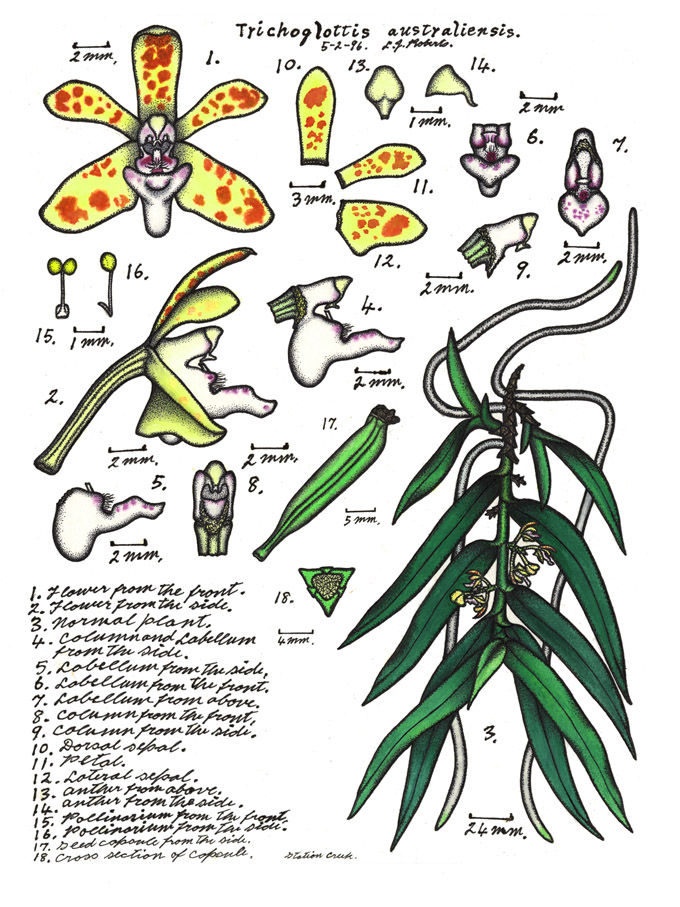
- Illustration by Lewis Roberts

Scientific classification
- Kingdom: Plantae
- Clade: Tracheophytes
- Clade: Angiosperms
- Clade: Monocots
- Order: Asparagales
- Family: Orchidaceae
- Subfamily: Epidendroideae
- Genus: Trichoglottis
- Species: T. australiensis

Binomial name
- Trichoglottis australiensis Dockrill

= Trichoglottis australiensis =

Weeping cherub orchid

Species of orchid

Trichoglottis australiensis, commonly known as the weeping cherub orchid, is an epiphytic or lithophytic clump-forming orchid. It has thick, cord-like roots, flattened, branching stems, many thick, leathery, glossy leaves and between two and six creamy yellow flowers with reddish blotches. This orchid only occurs in tropical North Queensland.

== Description ==
Trichoglottis australiensis is an epiphytic or lithophytic herb that forms coarse, untidy clumps with thick, cord-like roots and flattened branching stems 100–500 millimetres (3.9–20 in) long. There are a large number of thick, glossy, leathery, lance-shaped leaves 70–120 millimetres (2.8–4.7 in) long and 2–25 millimetres (0.079–0.98 in) wide scattered in two ranks along the stems. Creamy yellow resupinate flowers with reddish blotches, 10–12 millimetres (0.39–0.47 in) long and wide are arranged in clusters of between two and six on flowering stems arising opposite the leaf axils. The dorsal sepal is about 7 millimetres (0.28 in) long and 2 millimetres (0.079 in) wide, the lateral sepals slightly wider and the petals about the same size as the dorsal sepal. The labellum is about 5 millimetres (0.20 in) long and 2.5 millimetres (0.098 in) wide with three lobes, the middle lobe about 2.5 millimetres (0.098 in) long and hairy. Flowering occurs from November to May.

== Taxonomy and naming ==
Trichoglottis australiensis was first formally described in 1967 by Alick Dockrill and the description was published in The Orchadian from a specimen collected in the McIlwraith Range by Malcolm Brown. The specific epithet (australiensis) refers to Australia, the ending -ensis being a Latin suffix "denoting place", "locality" or "country".

== Distribution and habitat ==
The weeping cherub orchid grows on trees and rocks in dense vegetation along gullies and in other humid places. It only occurs in the Iron and McIlwraith Ranges at altitudes between 400 and 600 metres (1,300 and 2,000 ft).

== Conservation ==
This orchid is listed as "vulnerable" under the Queensland Government Nature Conservation Act 1992.
