= Mesophile =

Organism that thrives in moderate temperatures

A mesophile is an organism that grows best in moderate temperature, neither too hot nor too cold, with an optimum growth range from 20 to 45 °C (68 to 113 °F). The optimum growth temperature for these organisms is 37 °C (about 99 °F). The term is mainly applied to microorganisms. Organisms that prefer extreme environments are known as extremophiles. Mesophiles have diverse classifications, belonging to two domains: Bacteria, Archaea, and to kingdom Fungi of domain Eukarya. Mesophiles belonging to the domain Bacteria can either be gram-positive or gram-negative. Oxygen requirements for mesophiles can be aerobic or anaerobic. There are three basic shapes of mesophiles: coccus, bacillus, and spiral.

== Habitat ==
The habitats of mesophiles can include cheese and yogurt. They are often included during fermentation of beer and wine making. Since normal human body temperature is 37 °C, the majority of human pathogens are mesophiles, as are most of the organisms comprising the human microbiome.

== Mesophiles vs. extremophiles ==
Mesophiles are the opposite of extremophiles. Extremophiles that prefer cold environments are termed psychrophilic, those preferring warmer temperatures are termed thermophilic or thermotropic and those thriving in extremely hot environments are hyperthermophilic. A genome-wide computational approach has been designed by Zheng, et al. to classify bacteria into mesophilic and thermophilic.

== Adaptations ==
All bacteria have their own optimum environmental surroundings and temperatures in which they thrive. Many factors are responsible for a given organism's optimal temperature range, but evidence suggests that the expression of particular genetic elements (alleles) can alter the temperature-sensitive phenotype of the organism. A study published in 2016 demonstrated that mesophilic bacteria could be genetically engineered to express certain alleles from psychrophilic bacteria, consequently shifting the restrictive temperature range of the mesophilic bacteria to closely match that of the psychrophilic bacteria.

Due to the less stable structure of mesophiles, it has reduced flexibility for protein synthesis. Mesophiles are not able to synthesize proteins in low temperatures. It is more sensitive to temperature changes, and the fatty acid composition of the membrane does not allow for much fluidity. Decreasing the optimal temperature of 37 °C to 0 °C to 8 °C leads to a gradual decrease in protein synthesis. Cold-induced proteins (CIPs) are induced during low temperatures, which then allows cold-shock proteins (CSPs) to synthesize. The shift back to the optimal temperature sees an increase, indicating that mesophiles are highly dependent on temperature. Oxygen availability also affects microorganism growth.

There are two explanations for thermophiles being able to survive at such high temperatures whereas mesophiles can not. The most evident explanation is that thermophiles are believed to have cell components that are relatively more stable than the cell components of mesophiles which is why thermophiles are able to live at higher temperatures than mesophiles. "A second school of thought, as represented by the writings of Gaughran (21) and Allen (3), believes that rapid resynthesis of damaged or destroyed cell constituents is the key to the problem of biological stability to heat."

== Oxygen requirements ==
Due to the diversity of mesophiles, oxygen requirements greatly vary. Aerobic respiration requires the use of oxygen and anaerobic does not. There are three types of anaerobes. Facultative anaerobes grow in the absence of oxygen, using fermentation instead. During fermentation, sugars are converted to acids, alcohol, or gases. If there is oxygen present, it will use aerobic respiration instead. Obligate anaerobes cannot grow in the presence of oxygen. Aerotolerant anaerobes can withstand oxygen.

== Roles ==
Microorganisms play an important role in decomposition of organic matter and mineralization of nutrients. In aquatic environments, the diversity of the ecosystem allows for the diversity of mesophiles. The functions of each mesophile rely on the surroundings, most importantly temperature range. Bacteria such as mesophiles and thermophiles are used in the cheesemaking due to their role in fermentation. "Traditional microbiologists use the following terms to indicate the general (slightly arbitrary) optimum temperature for the growth of bacteria: psychrophiles (15–20 °C), mesophiles (30–37 °C), thermophiles (50–60 °C) and extreme thermophiles (up to 122 °C)". Both mesophiles and thermophiles are used in cheesemaking for the same reason; however, they grow, thrive and die at different temperatures. Psychrotrophic bacteria contribute to dairy products spoiling, getting mouldy or going bad due to their ability to grow at lower temperatures such as in a refrigerator.

== Examples ==
Some notable mesophiles include Listeria monocytogenes, Staphylococcus aureus, and Escherichia coli. Other examples of species of mesophiles are Clostridium kluyveri, Pseudomonas maltophilia, Thiobacillus novellus, Streptococcus pyogenes, and Streptococcus pneumoniae. Different types of diseases and infections typically have pathogens from mesophilic bacteria such as the ones listed above.

=== Listeria monocytogenes ===
Listeria monocytogenes is a gram-positive bacterium. It is closely related to Bacillus and Staphylococcus. It is a rod-shaped, facultative anaerobe that is motile by peritrichous flagella. L. monocytogenes motility is limited from 20 °C to 25 °C. At the optimal temperature, it loses its motility. This bacterium is responsible for listeriosis which derives from contaminated food.

=== Staphylococcus aureus ===
Staphylococcus aureus was first identified in 1880. It is responsible for different infections stemming from an injury. The bacterium overcomes the body's natural mechanisms. Long lasting infections of S. aureus includes pneumonia, meningitis, and osteomyelitis. S. aureus is commonly contracted in hospital settings.

=== Escherichia coli ===
Escherichia coli is a gram-negative, rod-shaped facultative anaerobic bacterium that does not produce spores. The bacterium is a member of Enterobacteriaceae. It is capable of producing enterotoxins which are thermolabile or thermostable. Other characteristics of E. coli are that it is oxidase-negative, citrate-negative, methyl-red positive, and Voges-Proskauer-negative. To sum up E. coli, it is a coliform. It is able to use glucose and acetate as a carbon source for fermentation. E. coli is commonly found in the gut of living organisms. E. coli has many capabilities such as being a host for recombinant DNA and being a pathogen.

== See also ==
- Anaerobic digestion
- Mesophilic digester
- Mesophyte
- Neutrophile
- Reverse ecology
