= Intrasporangiaceae =

Scientific classification
- Domain: Bacteria
- Kingdom: Bacillati
- Phylum: Actinomycetota
- Class: Actinomycetes
- Order: Micrococcales
- Family: Intrasporangiaceae; Rainey et al. 1997

Type genus
- Intrasporangium Kalakoutskii et al. 1967 (Approved Lists 1980)

Genera
- Aquipuribacter Tóth et al. 2012; Fodinibacter Wang et al. 2009; Humibacillus Kageyama et al. 2008; Intrasporangium Kalakoutskii et al. 1967 (Approved Lists 1980); Janibacter Martin et al. 1997; Knoellia Groth et al. 2002; Kribbia Jung et al. 2006; Lapillicoccus Lee and Lee 2007; Marihabitans Kageyama et al. 2008; Ornithinibacter Xiao et al. 2011; Ornithinicoccus Groth et al. 1999; Oryzihumus Kageyama et al. 2005; Oryzobacter Kim et al. 2015; Pedococcus Nouioui et al. 2018; Phycicoccus Lee 2006; Segeticoccus Lee and Whang 2020; Terrabacter Collins et al. 1989; Terracoccus Prauser et al. 1997; Tetrasphaera Maszenan et al. 2000

Synonyms
- Aquipuribacteraceae Salam et al. 2020

Family of bacteria

Intrasporangiaceae is an actinomycete family. The family is named after the type genus Intrasporangium. The type species of Intrasporangium (I. calvum) was originally thought to form endospores; however, the mycelium of this strain may bear intercalary vesicles that were originally identified as spores. No members of Intrasporangiaceae are known to form spores.

== Phylogeny ==
The currently accepted taxonomy is based on the List of Prokaryotic names with Standing in Nomenclature and the phylogeny is based on whole-genome sequences. (Note: Aquipuribacter, Fodinibacter, Humibacillus, Kribbia, Ornithinibacter, Ornithinicoccus, Oryzihumus, Oryzobacter, Segeticoccus, Terrabacter, and Terracoccus are not included in this phylogenetic tree.)

- - Intrasporangiaceae
    - Intrasporangium
    - - Janibacter
      - - Tetrasphaera
        - - Pedococcus
          - - Phycicoccus
            - Knoellia
  - outgroups
    Dermacoccaceae
