= Li River =

River in Guangxi, China

Li River 漓江
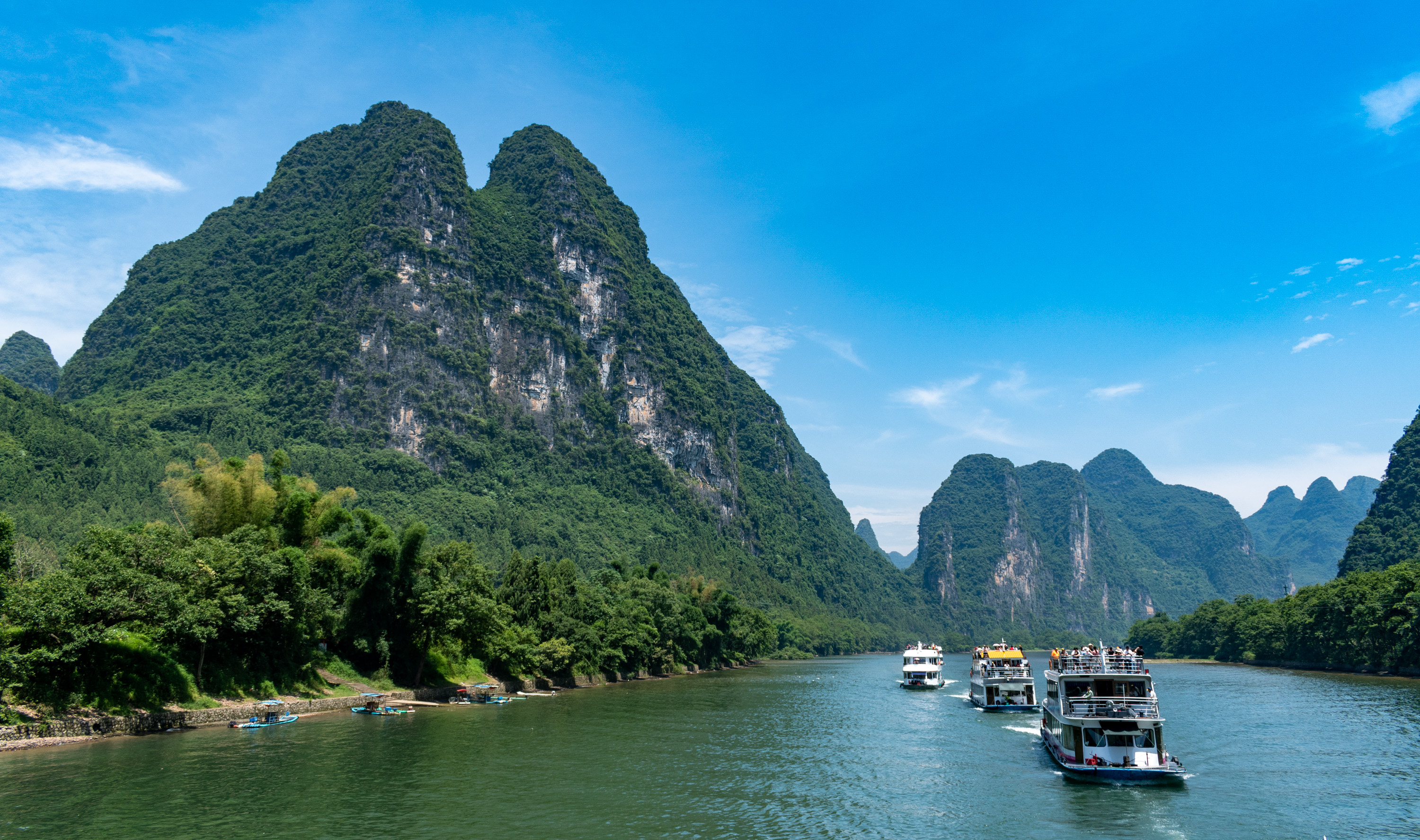

Location
- Country: China
- Subdivision: Guangxi

Physical characteristics
- Source: Mao'ershan
  - location: Xing'an County, Guangxi, China
  - coordinates: 25.88°N 110.47°E
- Mouth: Gui River
  - location: Pingle County, Guangxi, China
  - coordinates: 24.64°N 110.61°E
- Length: 164 km (102 mi)
- Discharge
  - location: Guilin
  - average: 215 m^{3}/s (7,600 cu ft/s)

Li River
- "Li River" in Simplified Chinese characters
- Traditional Chinese: 灕江
- Simplified Chinese: 漓江
Transcriptions
Standard Mandarin
- Hanyu Pinyin: Lí Jiāng
- IPA: [lǐ tɕjáŋ]

The Li River or Li Jiang (simplified Chinese: 漓江; traditional Chinese: 灕江; pinyin: Lí Jiāng) is the name for the upper reaches of the Gui River in northeastern Guangxi, China. It is part of the Xijiang River system in the Pearl River basin, flowing 164 kilometres (102 mi) from Xing'an County to Pingle County.

== Background ==
The Li River originates in the Mao'er Mountains in Xing'an County and flows in the general southern direction through Guilin, Yangshuo and Pingle. In Pingle, the Li merges with the Lipu and Gongcheng, becoming the Gui, and in turn falls into the Xijiang, the western tributary of the Pearl River.

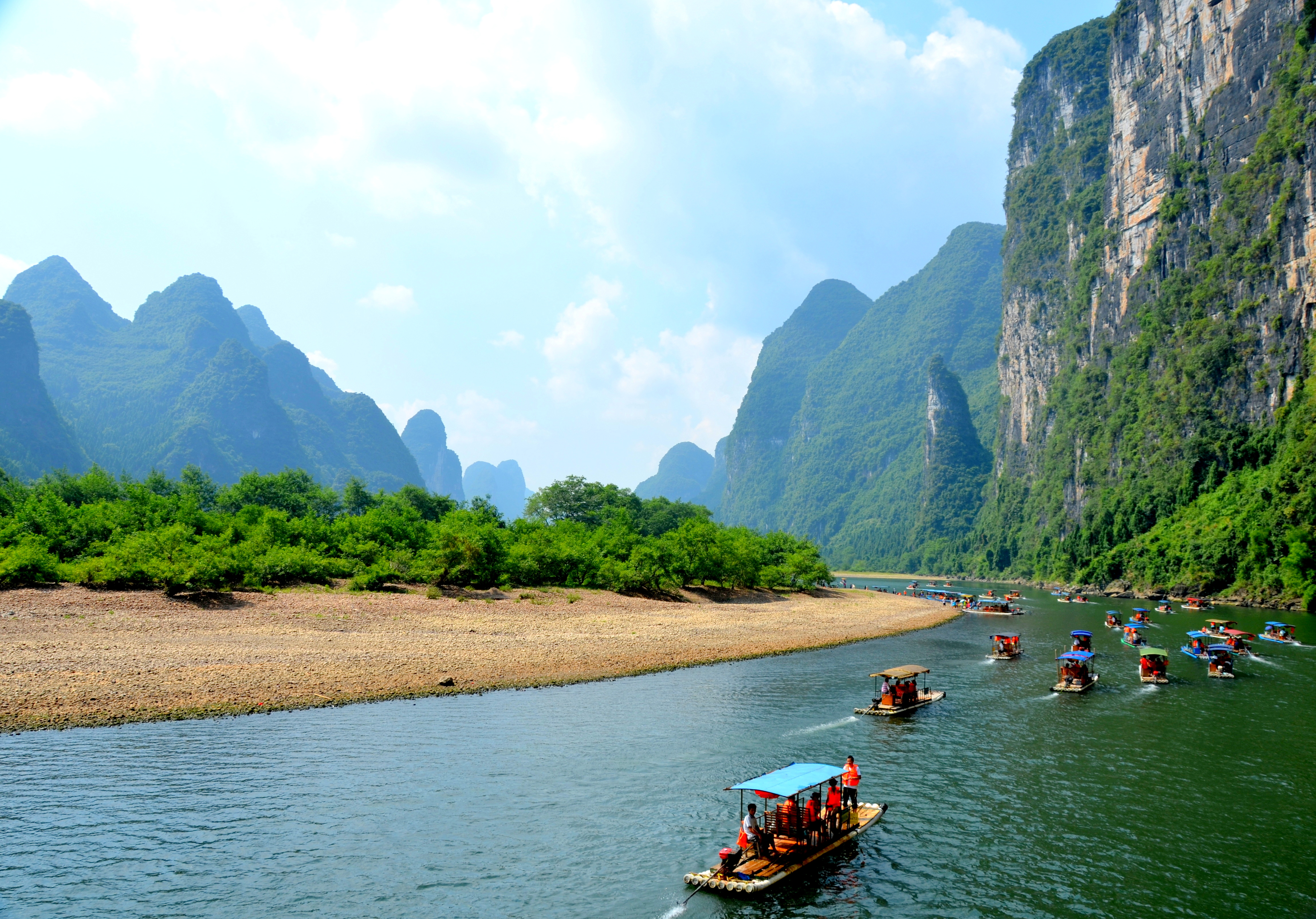
Tourist rafting boats cruise from Yangshuo County, on the Li River

The upper course of the Li River is connected by an ancient Lingqu canal with the Xiang River, which flows north into the Yangtze; this in the past made the Li and Gui Rivers part of a highly important waterway connecting the Yangtze valley with the Pearl delta.

The 439-kilometre (273 mi) course of the Li and Gui Rivers is flanked by green hills. Cormorant fishing is often associated with the Lijiang.

Cruises on the Li are famous, attracting millions of visitors per year.

== Geology ==
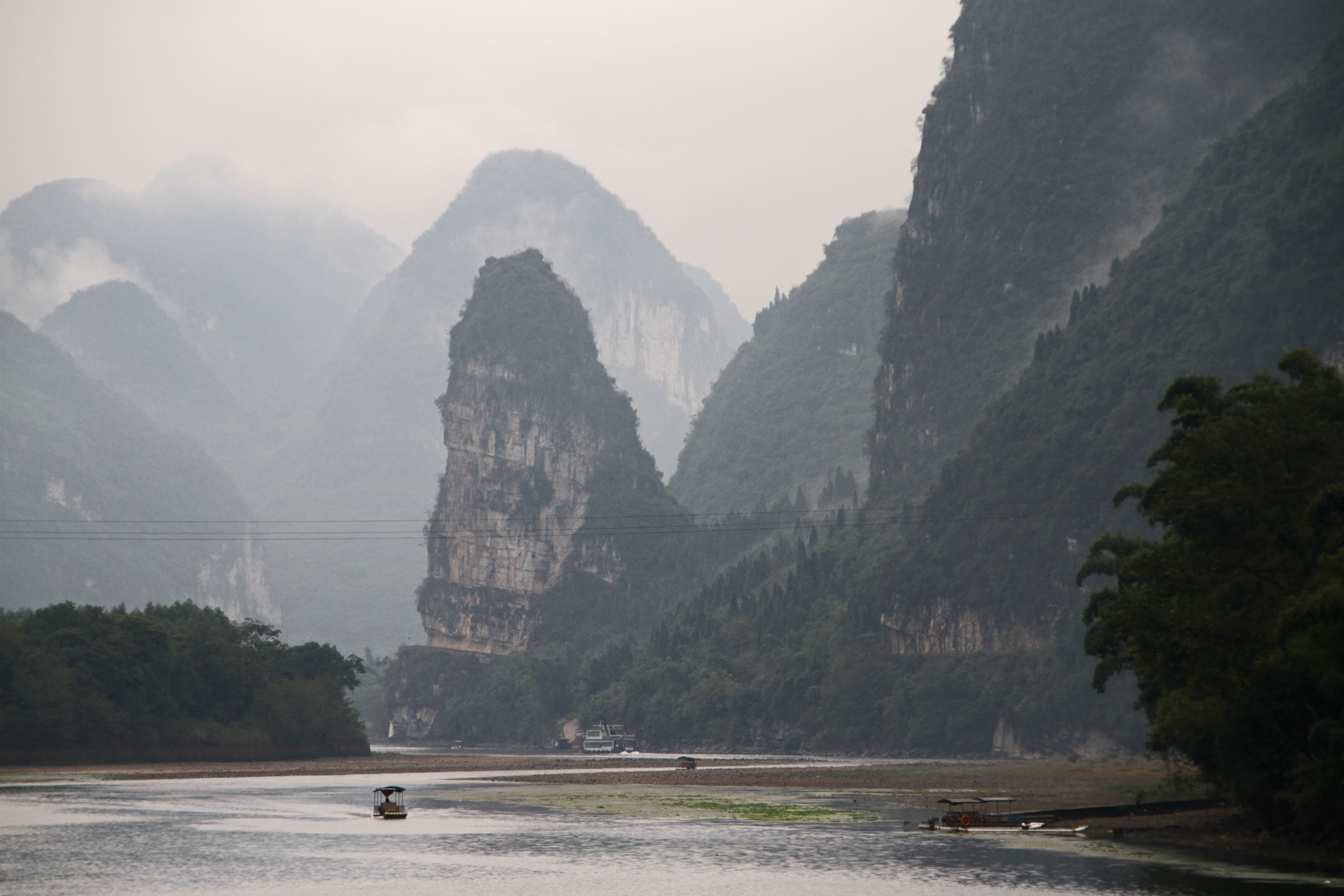
Upper reaches of the Li River

The Li and its tributaries drain the area from Guilin to Yangshuo, descending from 141-metre (463 ft) at Guilin to 103-metre (338 ft) at Yangshuo. Mean flow past Guilin is 215 cubic meters per second, and alluvium sediments consisting of well-sorted gravels covered by silty sand, forming floodplains and terraces along its route. Yet, it is the 2,600-metre (8,500 ft) of Devonian and Carboniferous limestones and karst terrain within the Guilin basin, that gives the area a dramatic landscape. Two distinctive types of karst are found, Fengcong, and Fenglin, which have evolved for the past 10–20 million years, within the Cenozoic.

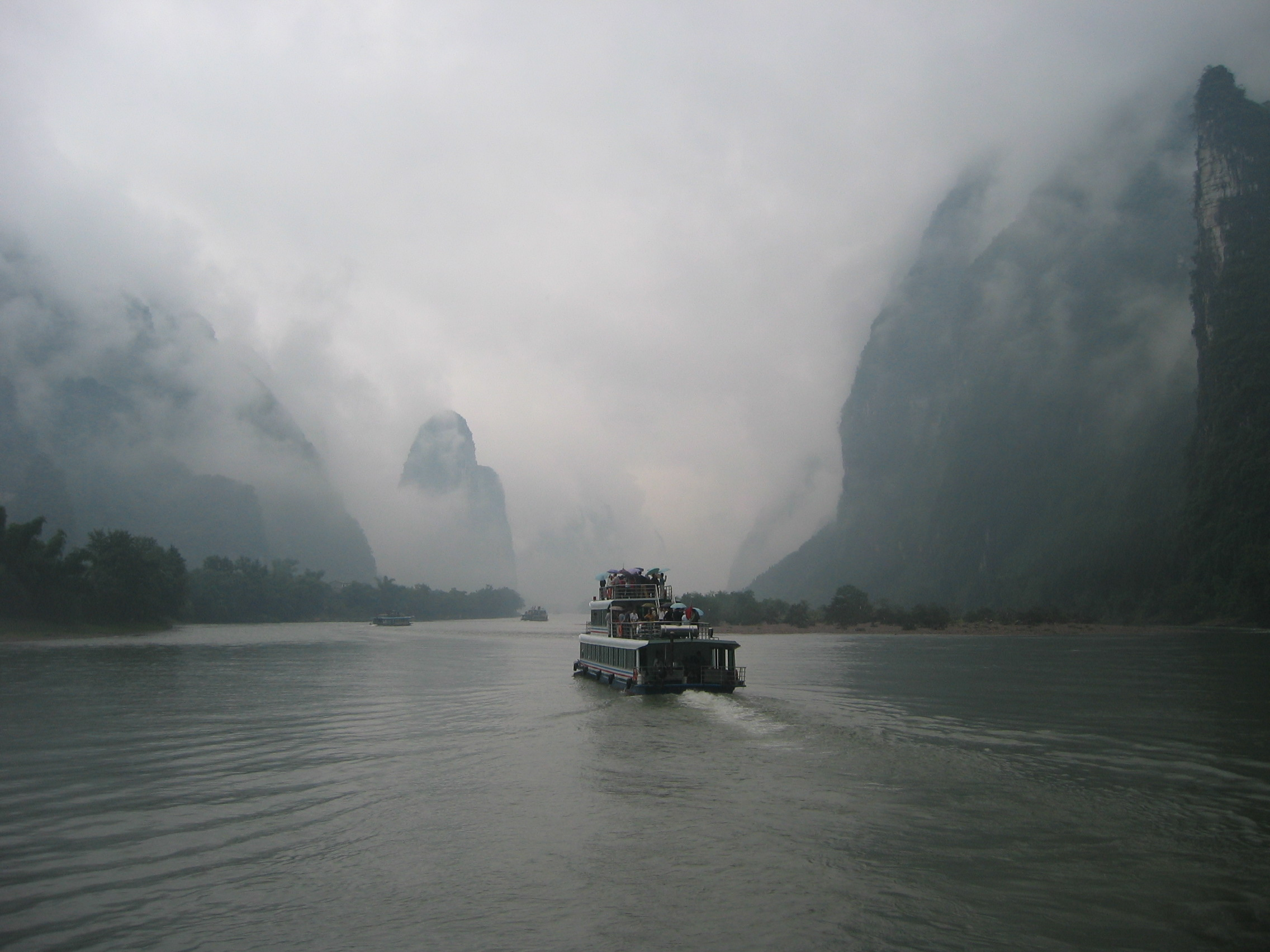
Fog on the Li River

Fengcong karst dominates the course of the Li River and is defined as a group of limestone hills with a common limestone base, with deep depressions (or dolines) between the peaks, and sometimes described as peak cluster depression karst. Hundreds of caves are present in this terrain, with 23 having passages longer than -1 km alongside the Li River gorge. The longest is the Guanyan Cave System which extends from Caoping to Nanxu.

Fenglin dominates the area around Yangshuo and south of Guilin and is defined as isolated limestone hills separated by a flat limestone surface generally covered by loose sediments, and sometimes described as a peak forest plain. The best-known fenglin is the tower karst around Yangshuo. These towers consist of strong and massive limestone forming near vertical sides with base diameters less than 1.5 times their height. The heights of the towers range from 30 to 80 m in the central basin but can be as high as 300 m near the Fengcong. Fenglin evolves from Fengcong by slow and continuous tectonic uplift, associated with the Himalayan orogenic zone, and even slower erosion of the towers.

Famous show caves in the Guilin area include the Qixing Dong and the Luti Dong.

== Notable features ==
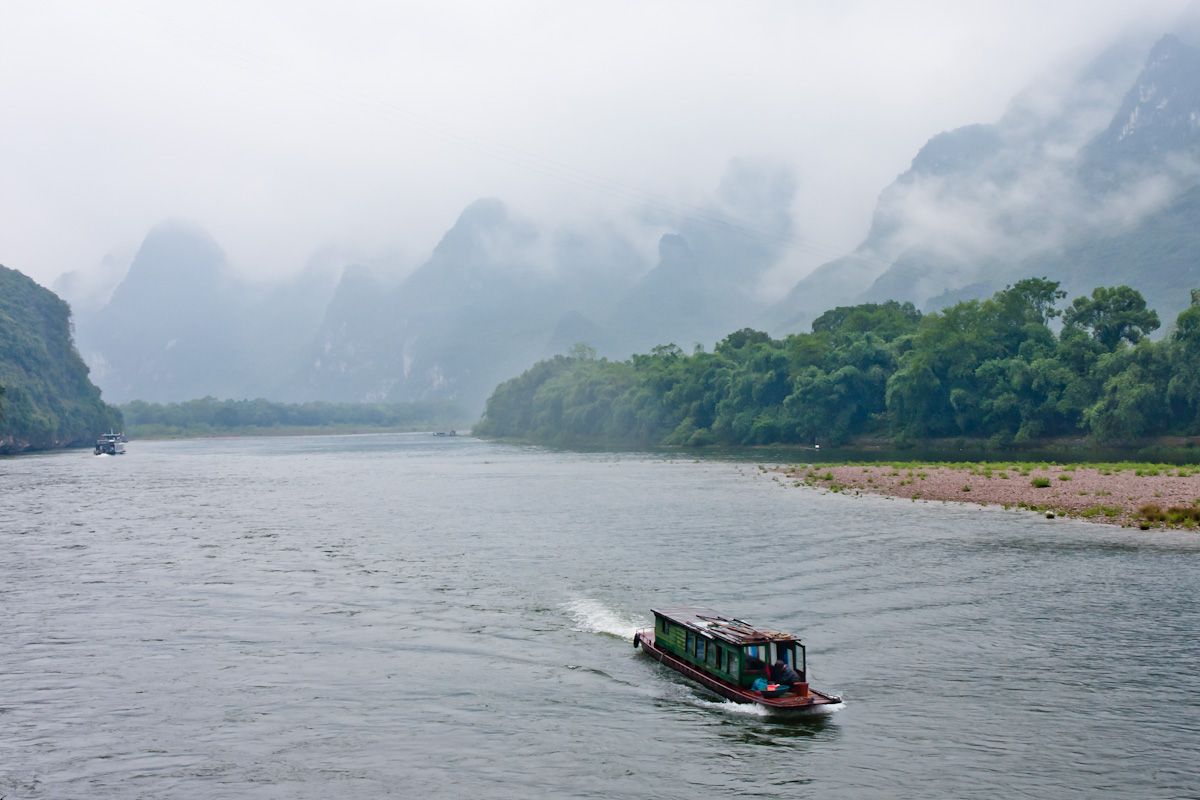
Fishing boat on the Li River

1. Reed Flute Cave: a limestone cave with a large number of stalactites, stalagmites, stalacto-stalagmites, rocky curtains, and cave corals.
2. Seven-Star Park: the largest park in Guilin.
3. Mountain of Splendid Hues: a mountain consisting of many layers of variously colored rocks.
4. Elephant-Trunk Hill: a hill that looks like a giant elephant drinking water with its trunk. It is a symbol of the city of Guilin.
5. Lingqu Canal: dug in 214 BC, is one of ancient China's three big water conservation projects and the oldest existing canal in the world.
6. Other attractions include Duxiu Peak, Nanxi Park, the Taohua River, the Giant Banyan, and the Huashan-Lijiang National Folklore Park.

The imagery of the Li River is featured in the fifth series of the 20 yuan note.

== Gallery ==
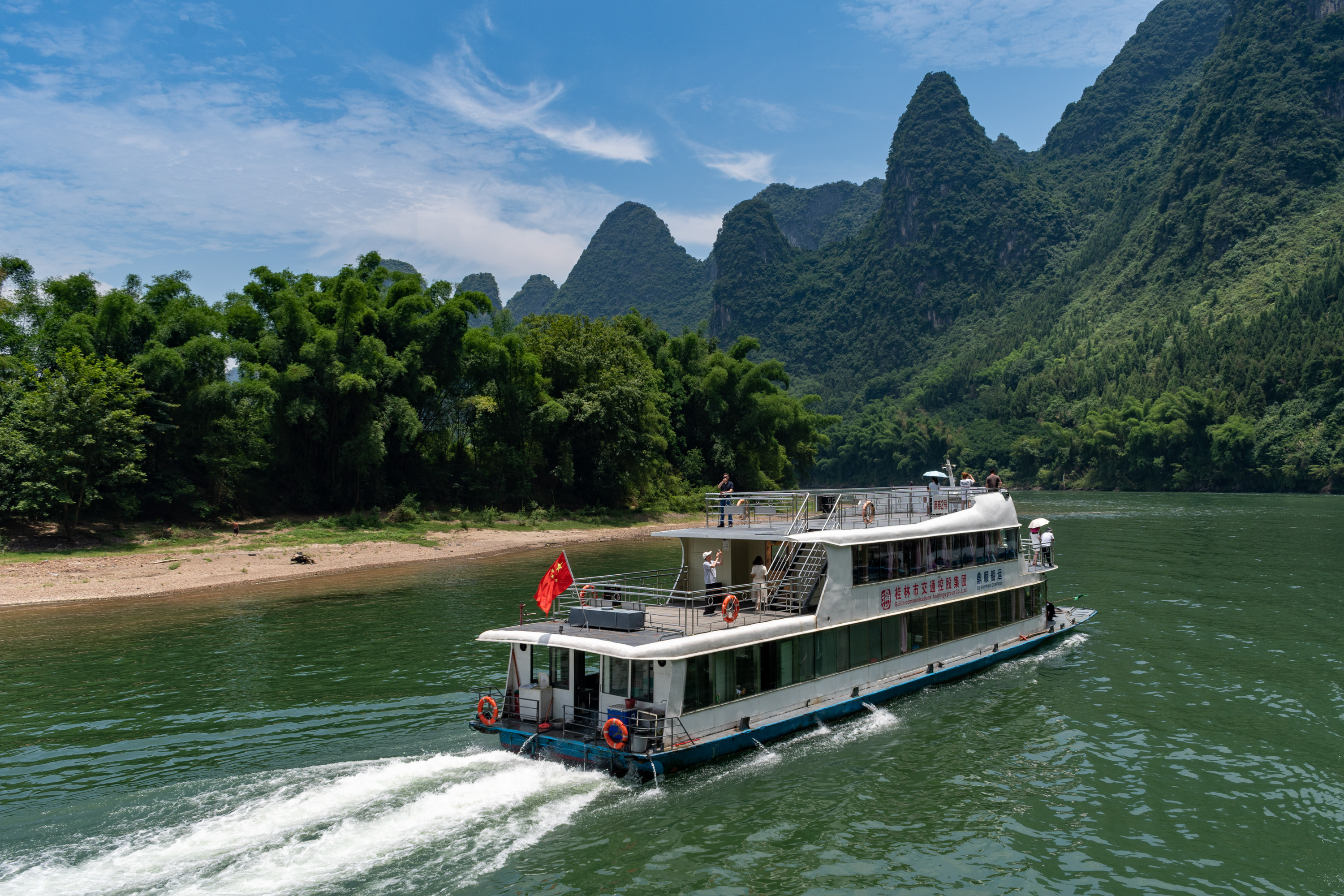

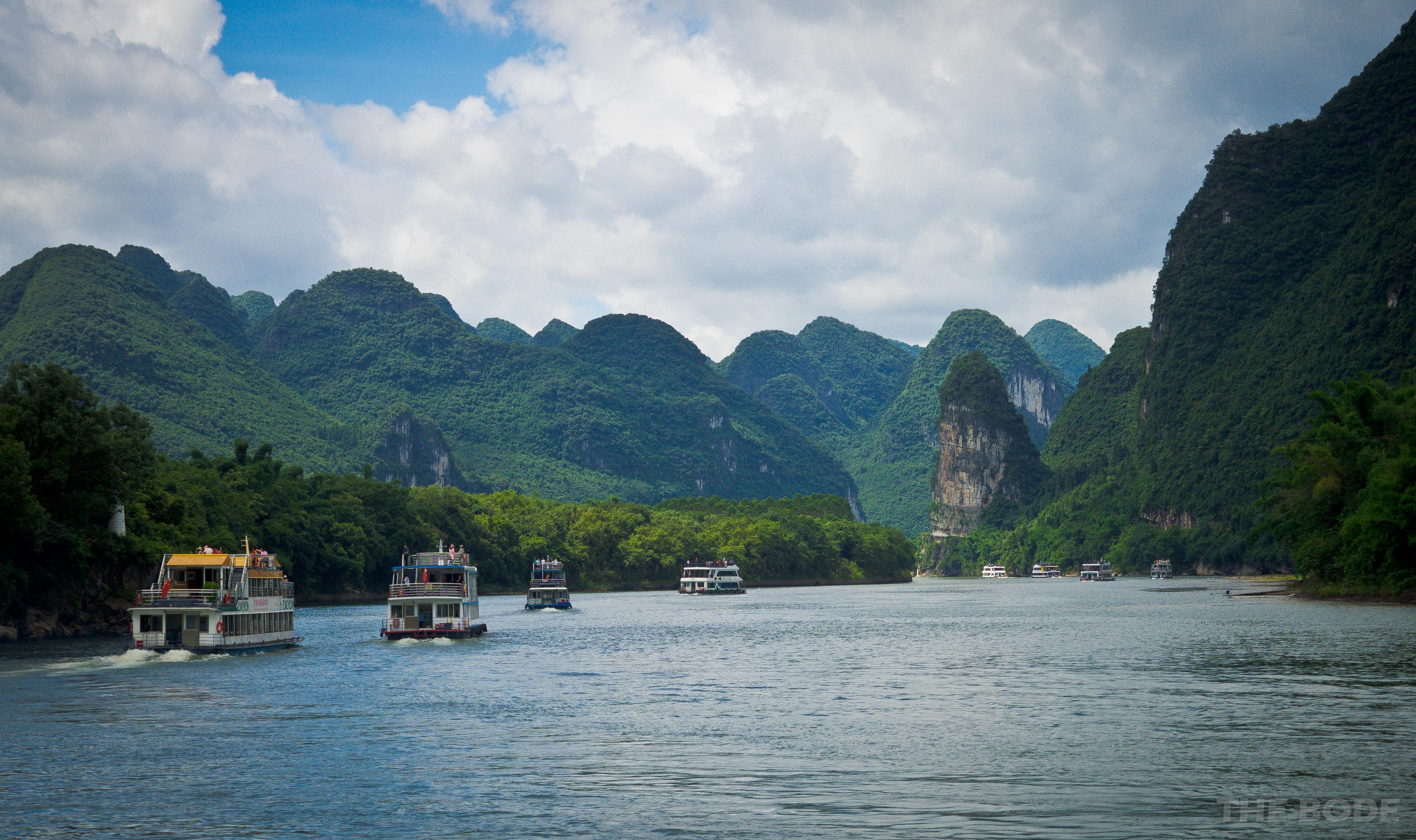

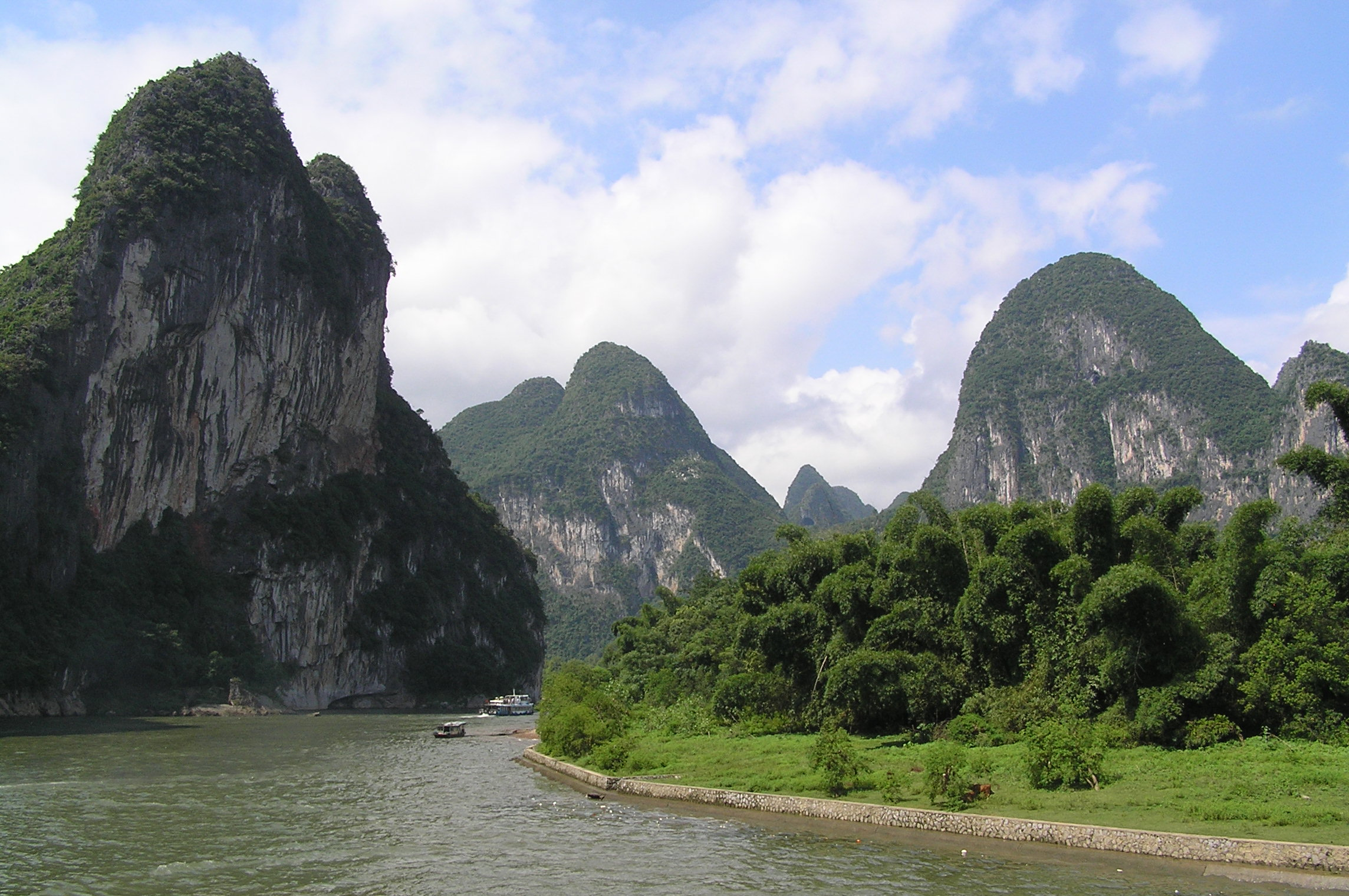

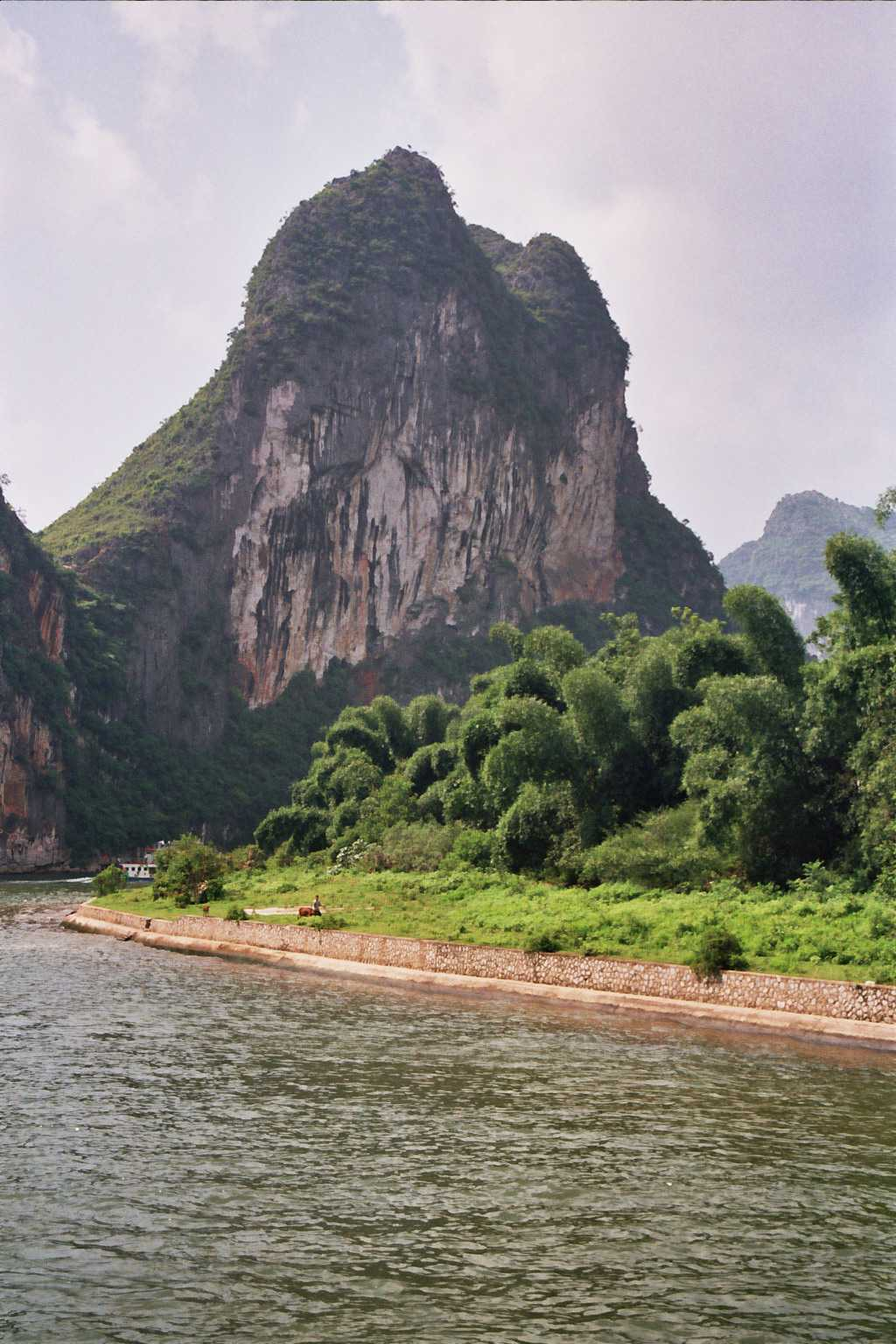

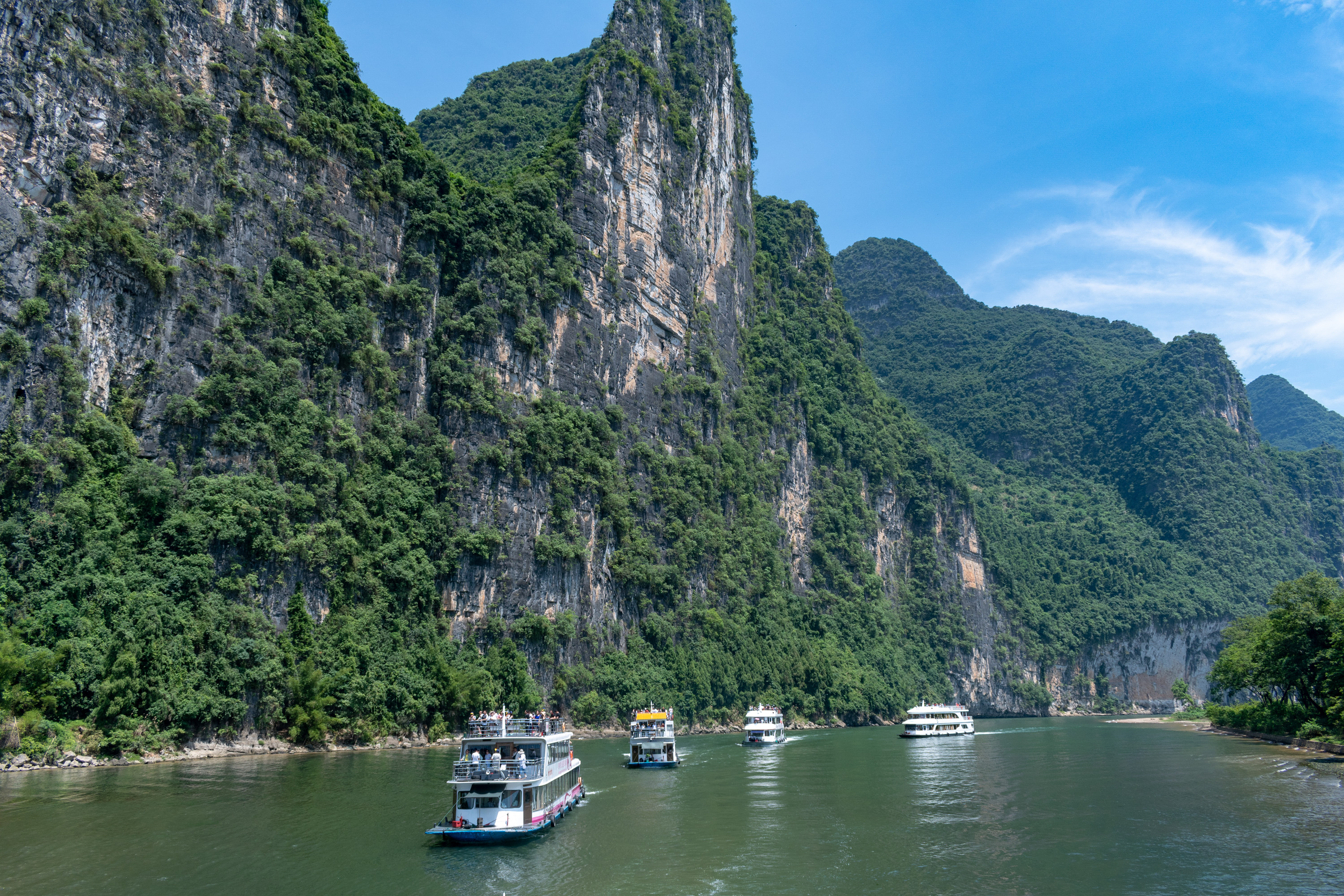

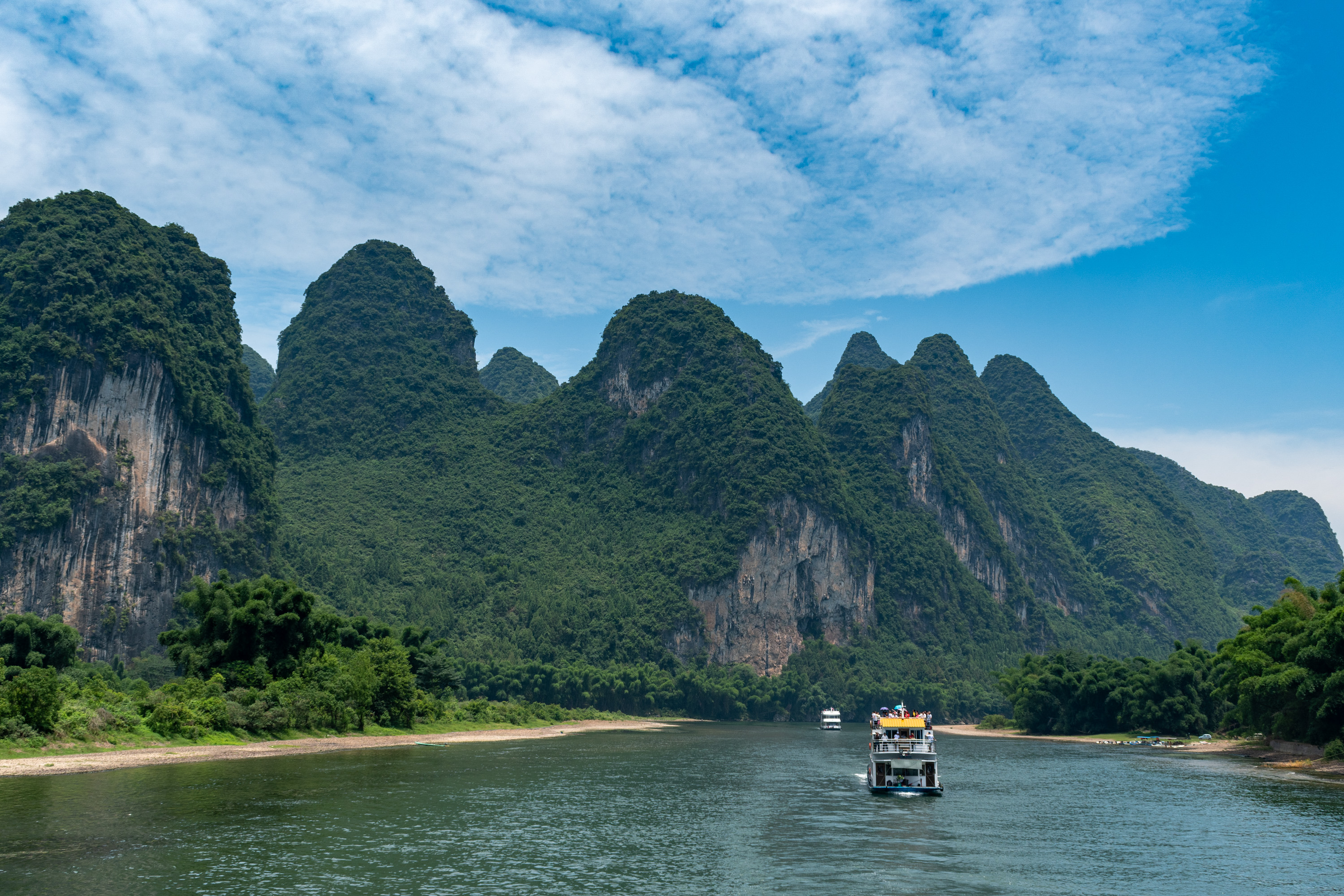

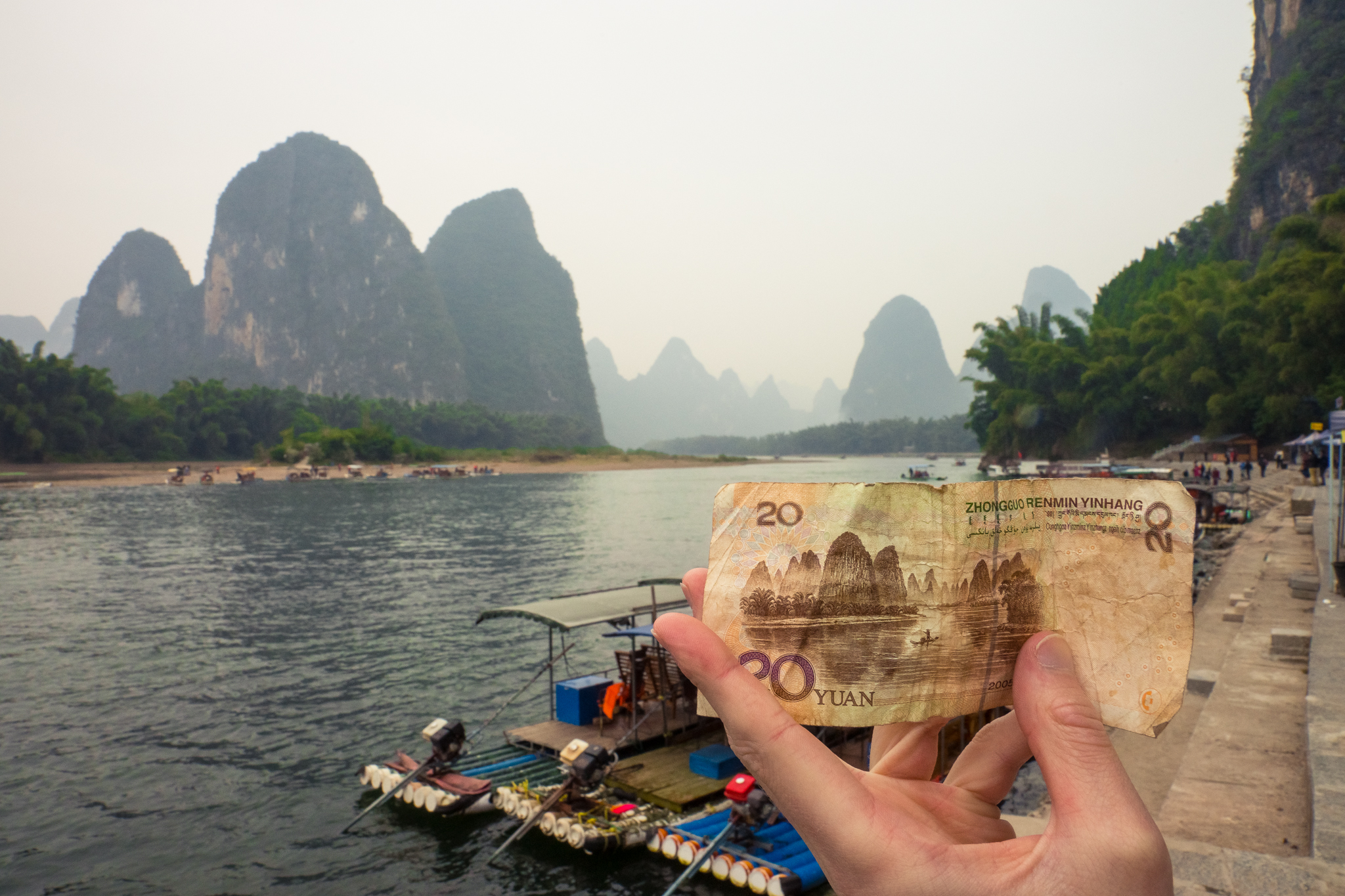
This is the view from the banks of the Li River, as pictured on the 20 Yuan note. Just on the outskirts of Xingping Town.

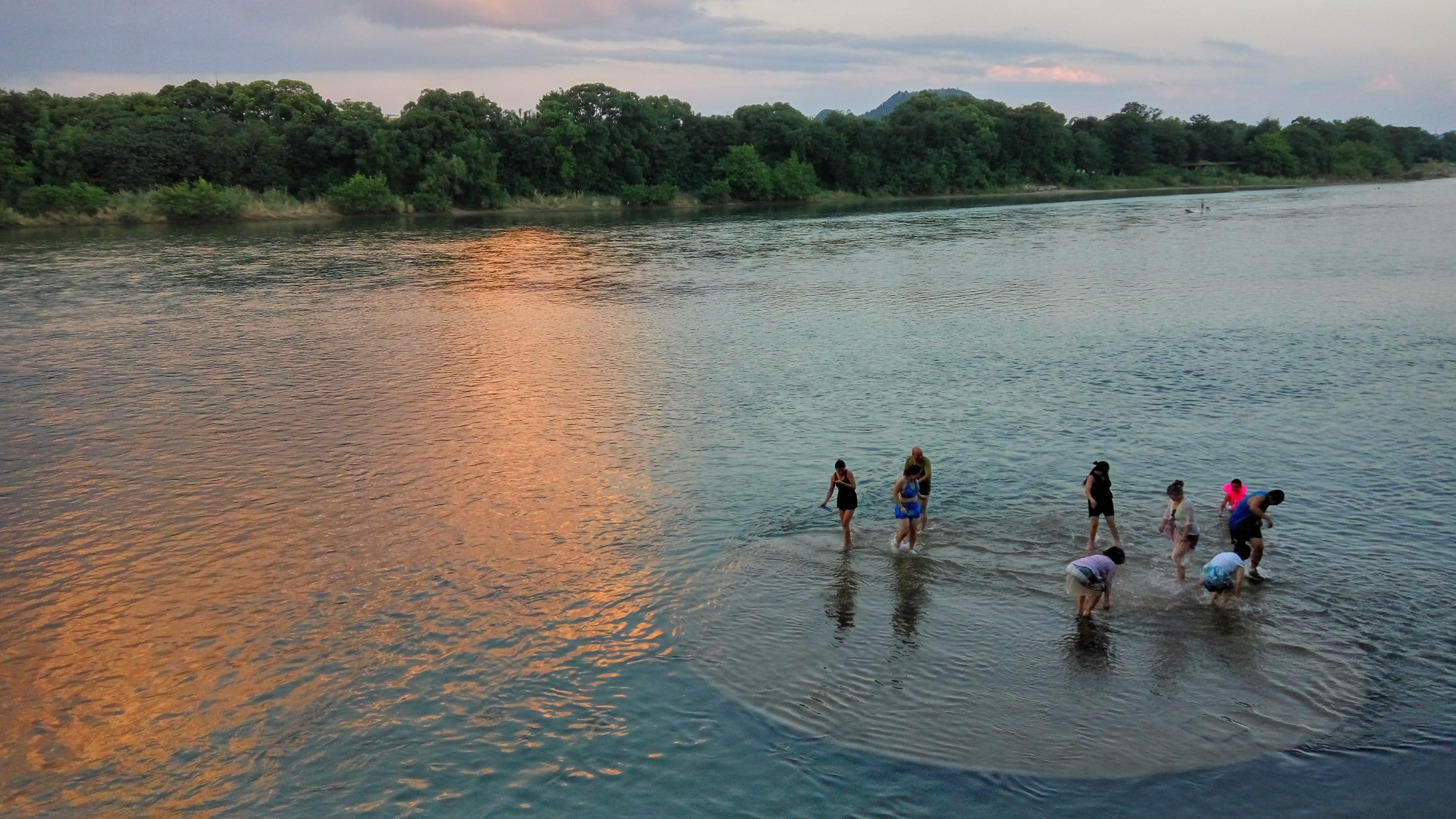
Locals playing in the Guilin section of the Li River in Guanxi Province, China.

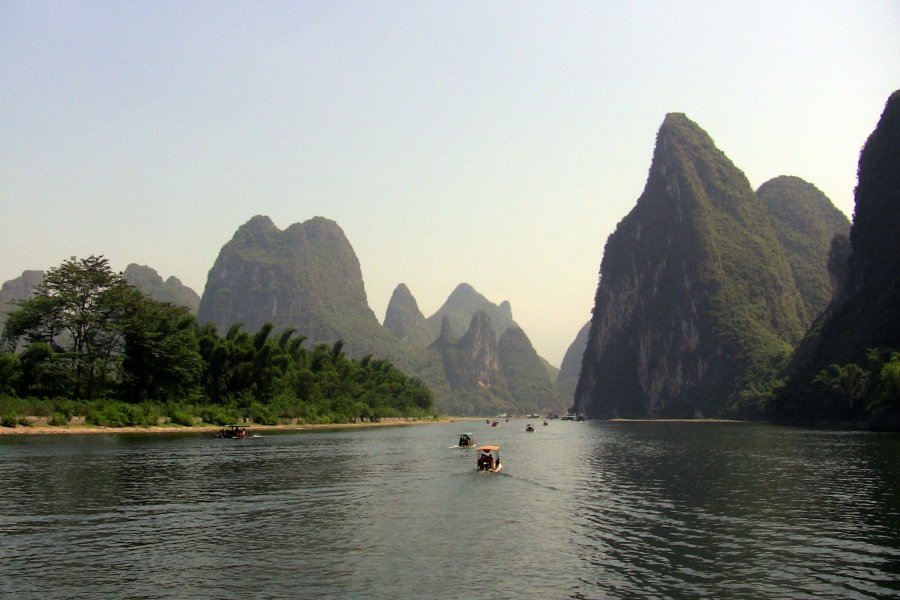

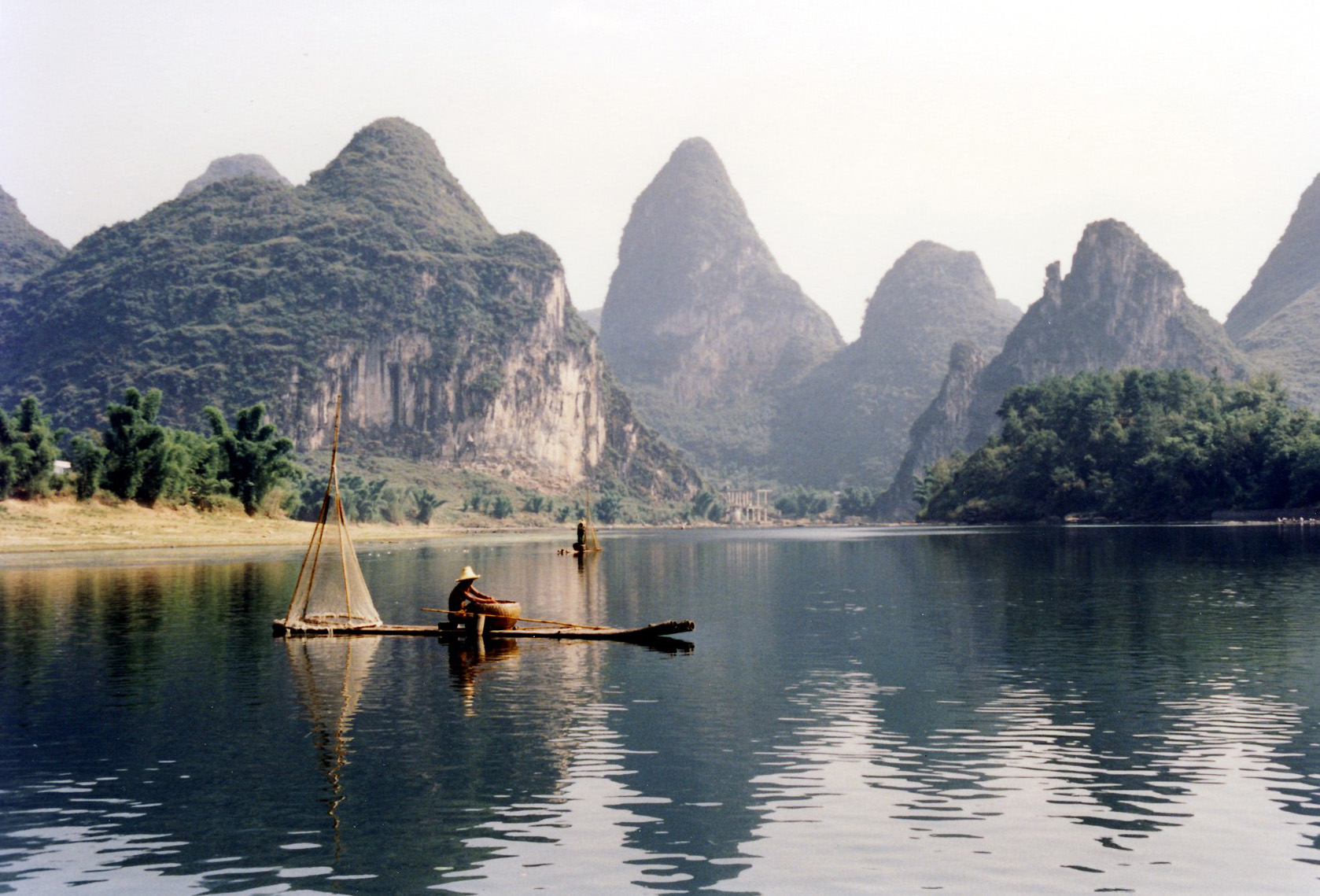

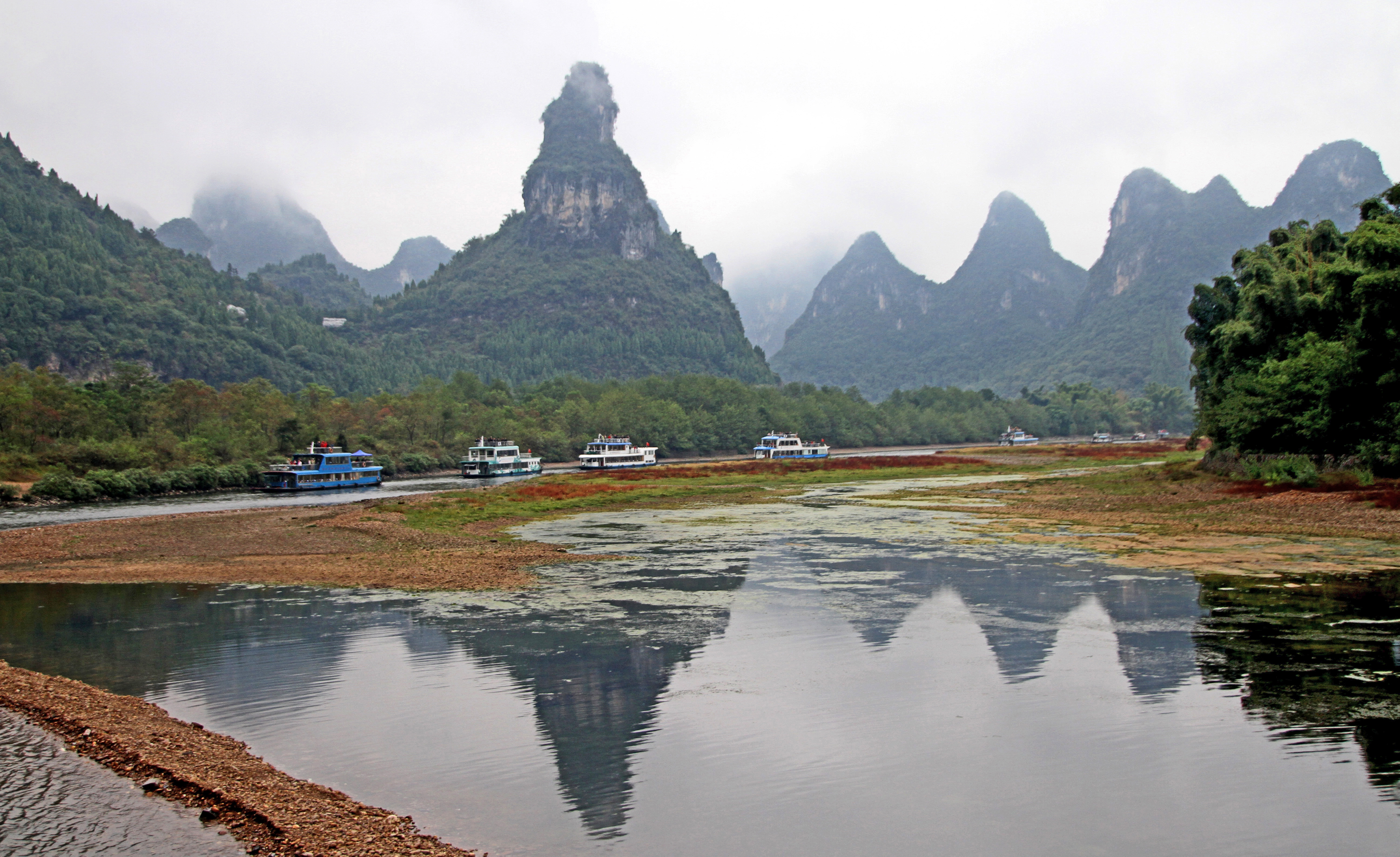

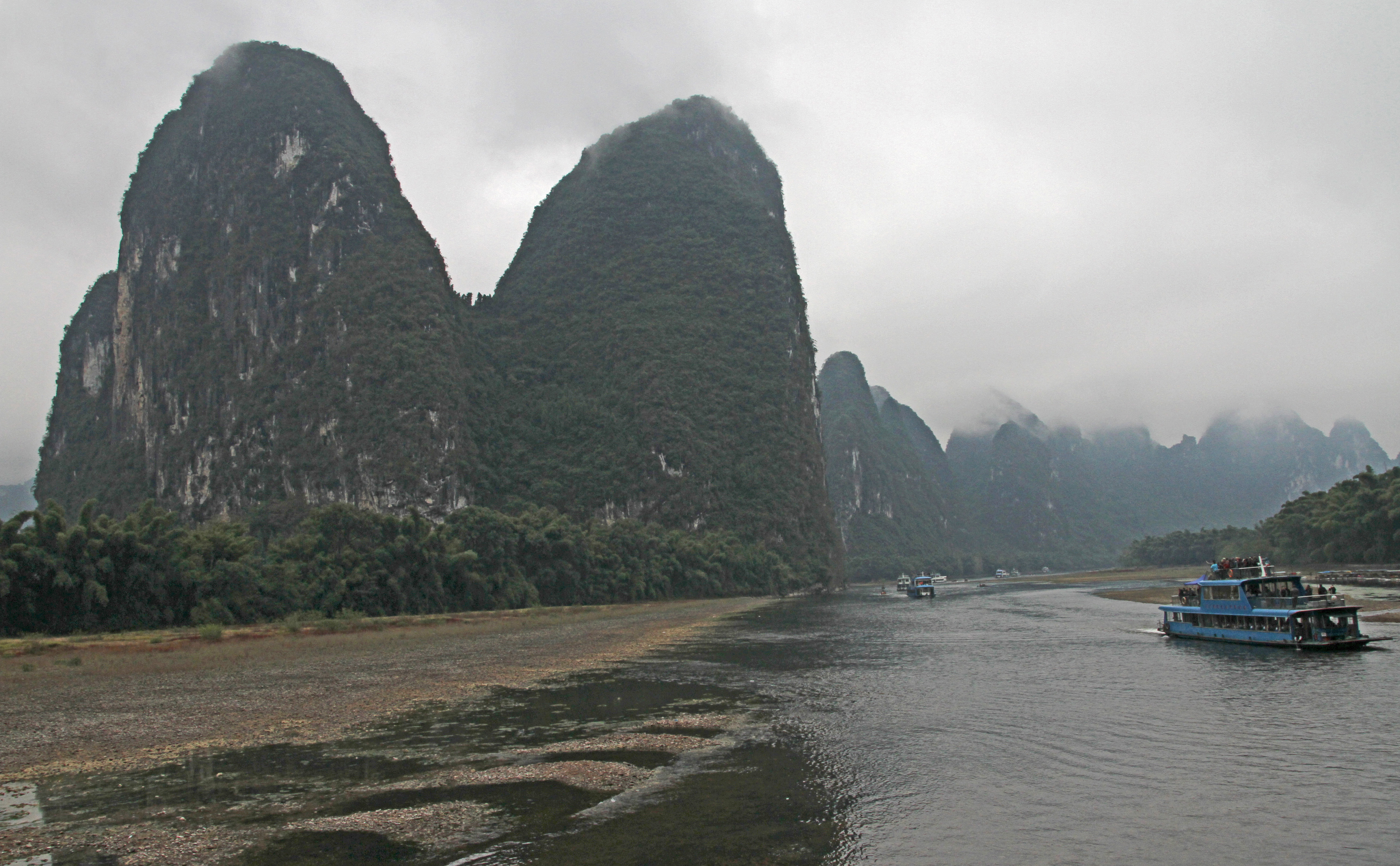

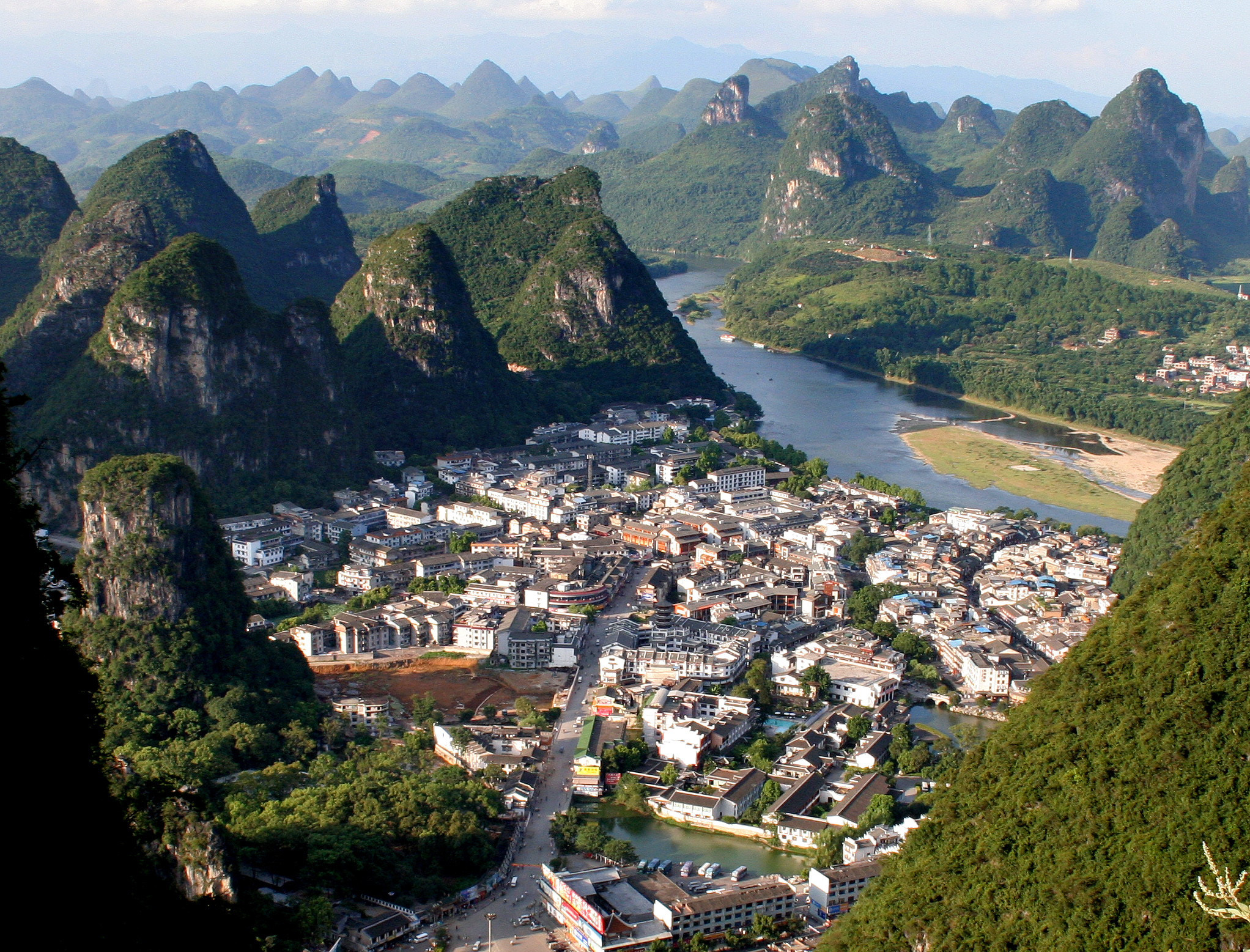
The town of Yangshuo
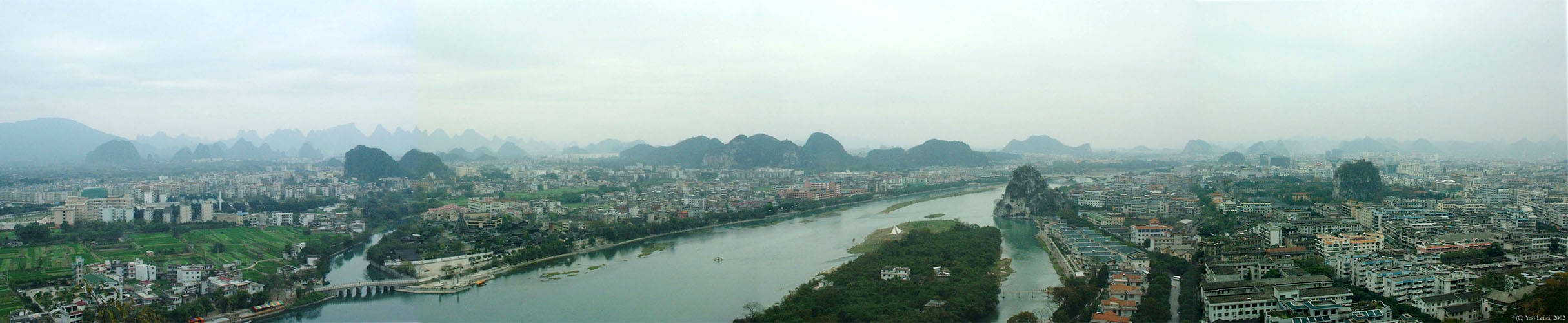
Guilin

== See also ==
- Geography of China
- List of rivers in China
