= Xi River =

Western tributary of the Pearl River

Coordinates: 22.0602°N 113.4792°E

Xi Jiang
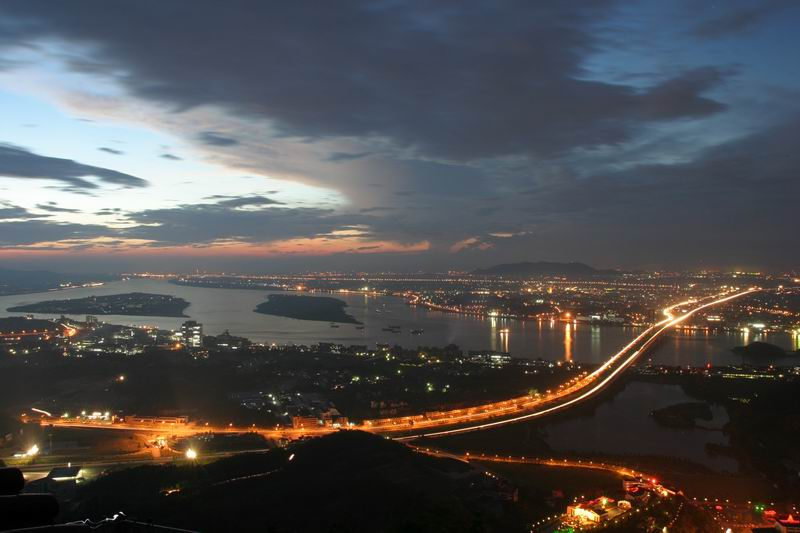
- Looking across the Xi River from Heshan to Jiujiang, Foshan City.

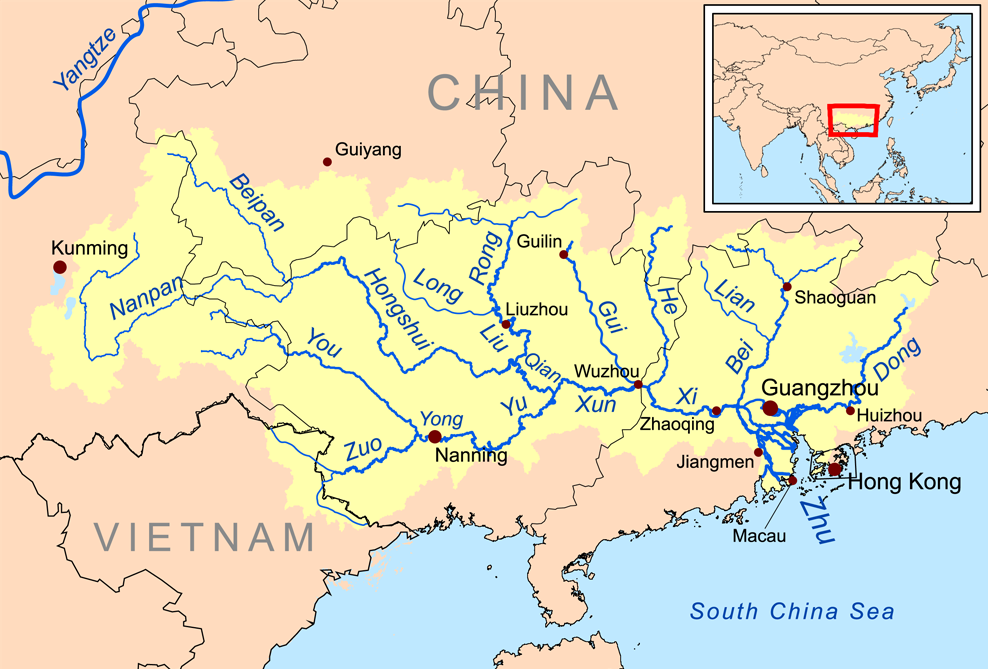
- The Pearl River system including the Xi River

Location
- Country: China and Vietnam

Physical characteristics
- Source
  - location: Gui Jiang and Xun Jiang in Wuzhou
- Mouth
  - location: The Pearl River Delta on the South China Sea
  - elevation: 0 m (0 ft)
- Length: 2,197 km (1,365 mi) to 2,271.8 km (1,411.6 mi) (Xi–Xun–Qian–Hongshui–Nanpan)
- Basin size: 437,000 km^{2} (169,000 mi^{2})
- Discharge
  - location: Pearl Delta
  - average: (Period: 2010–2020)9,631 m^{3}/s (340,100 cu ft/s)
  - minimum: 3,600 m^{3}/s (130,000 cu ft/s)
  - maximum: 34,000 m^{3}/s (1,200,000 cu ft/s)
- Discharge
  - location: Wuzhou
  - average: 7,410 m^{3}/s (262,000 cu ft/s)

Basin features
- Progression: South China Sea
- River system: Pearl River
- Tributaries
  - left: He Jiang, Gui Jiang, Hongshui Ho, Qian Jiang
  - right: Yu Jiang, Xun Jiang

Xi River
- Chinese: 西江
- Jyutping: Sai^{1} gong^{1}
- Hanyu Pinyin: Xī Jiāng
- Postal: West River
- Literal meaning: Western River
Transcriptions
Standard Mandarin
- Hanyu Pinyin: Xī Jiāng
- Wade–Giles: Hsi^{1} Chiang^{1}
Yue: Cantonese
- Jyutping: Sai^{1} gong^{1}

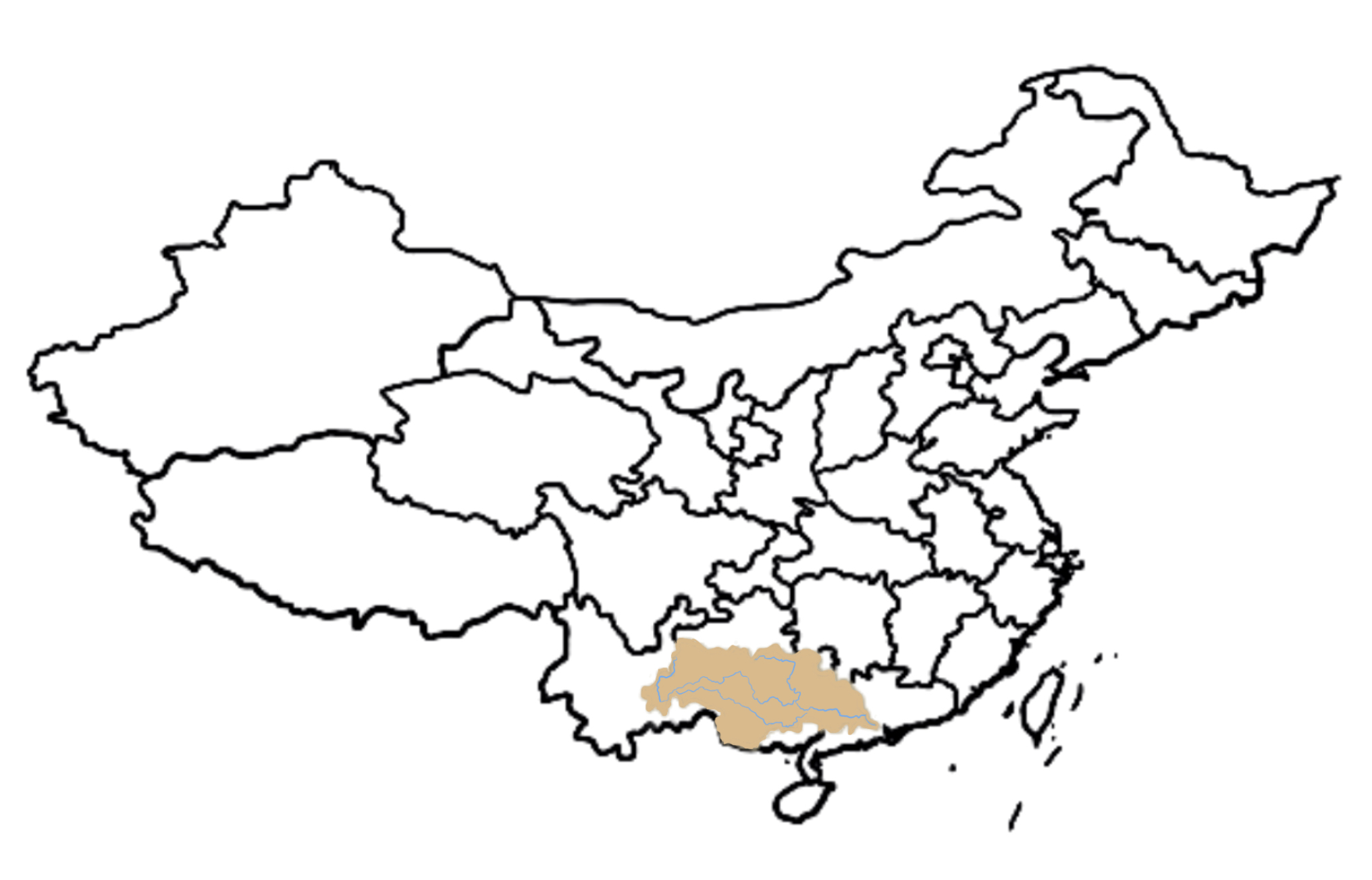
The location of Xi River in China

Marble Hill (Cockscomb Rock) on the West River, around 1871

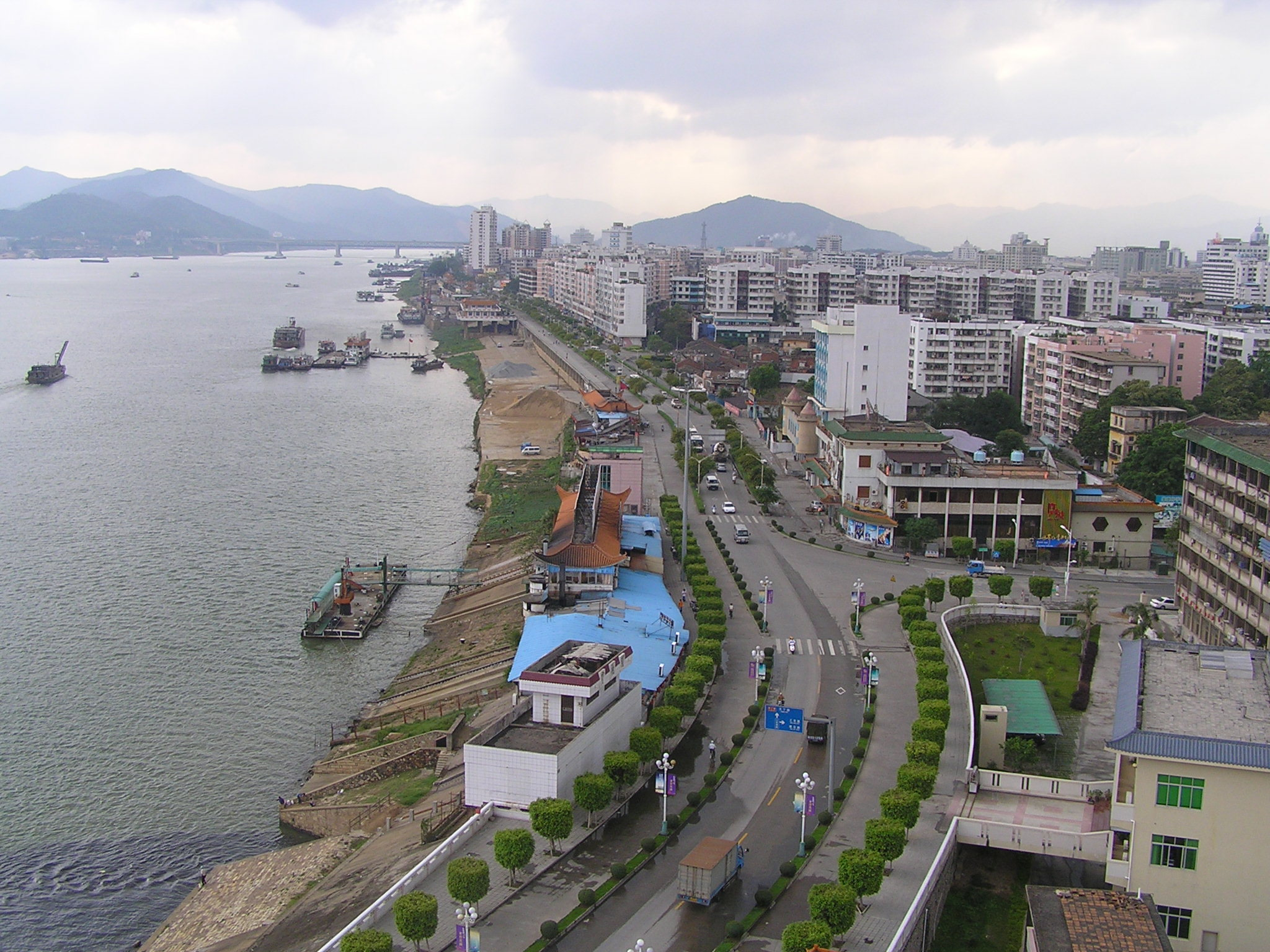
Xi River in Zhaoqing.

The Xi River (/ʃiː/; Chinese: 西江) or Si-Kiang is the western tributary of the Pearl River in southern China. It is formed by the confluence of the Gui and Xun Rivers in Wuzhou, Guangxi. It originates from the eastern foot of the Maxiong Mountain in Qujing City, Yunnan Province. Then it flows east through Guangdong, and enters the Pearl River Delta just east of the Lingyang Gorge in Zhaoqing. The main branch of the Xi River flows southeast through the delta entering the South China Sea at Modao Men, just west of Macau. The major cities along the Xi include Wuzhou, Zhaoqing, and Jiangmen.

The other two main tributaries of Pearl River are the Dong River (literally, the East River) and Bei River (the Northern River). As for other functions, it plays a vital role in carbon storage and transport in Southern China. The Xi River is facing some ecological challenges such as drought, invasive species, and pollution.

== Xi River system ==
The basin of the Xi River ranges from eastern Yunnan Province to southern Guangdong Province with a humid subtropical or tropical monsoon climate. The Xi River is navigable for its entire length. It is a commercial waterway of southern China, and links the delta cities to the interior. Over two thousand years ago, the Lingqu Canal was dug, connecting the Xi River basin (the Li River, which is a tributary of the Gui River) with the Xiang River, which flows into the Yangtze, thus providing a continuous waterway from the Pearl River Delta to the Yangtze Valley. The Xi River is rich in water conservancy and water resources, providing significant contributions to agricultural irrigation, river transportation, and power generation in coastal areas.

The Xi River is the largest of the Pearl's tributaries. Its volume of flow is second in China only to that of the Yangtze River, and it supplies water to many places in Guangxi, Guangdong and Macau. The greater Xi River is also one of China's longest. Existing in many segments it extends for 2,271.8 km (1,411.6 mi):

- Nanpan River: 950 km (590 mi)
- Hongshui River: 669.6 km (416.1 mi)
- Qian River: 121.0 km (75.2 mi)
- Xun River: 172.2 km (107.0 mi)
- Xi River (including main branch to the sea): 359.0 km (223.1 mi)

Xijiang river system (italics referring to rivers flowing outside of Guangxi)
		Fuchuan (富川江)	He (贺江)	Xi (西江)
		Li (漓江)	Gui (桂江)	Xi (西江)
Beipan River (北盘江)	Hongshui (红水河)	Qian (黔江)	Xun (浔江)	Xi (西江)
Nanpan River (南盘江)	Hongshui (红水河)	Qian (黔江)	Xun (浔江)	Xi (西江)
Rong (融江)	Liu (柳江)	Qian (黔江)	Xun (浔江)	Xi (西江)
Long (龙江)	Liu (柳江)	Qian (黔江)	Xun (浔江)	Xi (西江)
You (右江)	Yong (邕江)	Yu (郁江)	Xun (浔江)	Xi (西江)
Zuo (左江)	Yong (邕江)	Yu (郁江)	Xun (浔江)	Xi (西江)

== Major cities along the river ==
- Wuzhou
- Zhaoqing
- Foshan (Gaoming District)
- Heshan
- Jiangmen
- Zhongshan
- Zhuhai

== River Ecology ==
Rivers are a significant storage and transport system for both organic and inorganic carbon. The Xi River is an important source of atmospheric carbon dioxide in Southern China, with carbon inputs coming mainly from the river's headwater Nanpan and Beipan rivers. In the Beipan River, carbon inputs come from the oxidation of organic carbon and the coal industry along the river. In the Nanpan River, carbon inputs come mainly from soil and organic detritus.

== Environmental Issues ==
=== Drought ===
The Xi River basin has historically experienced droughts, which are worsening due to climate change and rapid urbanization along with many parts of the river. This increase in population is straining water resources. The climate of the watershed is subtropical to tropical monsoon, with 80% of precipitation falling between April and September. This extreme variation in yearly precipitation patterns exacerbates drought issues. Climate change is predicted to cause a significant decrease in average, highest, and lowest river flows, with average flow droppings anywhere from 4 to 49%. Increasing frequency and severity lead the meteorological and hydrological droughts.

=== Invasive species ===
Invasive or non-native species are an issue in rivers in southern China, including the Xi River. Southern China rears the majority of non-native species in aquaculture. These species are mainly introduced from aquaculture, and may predate or outcompete native species. Most introduced species are omnivores, including the Nile tilapia, the most common non-native species in southern China rivers.

=== Pollution ===
Many commercial fish species in the Xi River and the encompassing Pearl River watershed have been contaminated with significant amounts of Bisphenol A, common in plastics manufacturing. Bisphenol A is a chemical that can be harmful to the endocrine system of fish and humans.

== Protection ==
In order to protect the Xi River, the Guangxi Zhuang Autonomous Region government issued a notice prohibiting new construction projects and migration of people within the land occupied and inundated areas of the Xi River mainstream control project in Guangxi. Besides, the protection measures include: promulgated a fishing ban, wetland park protection, develop green recycling and low-carbon economic, the innovation of ecological and environmental protection cooperation mechanism and Xi River Basin Nature Reserve construction management.
