= Type 646 hydrographic survey ship =

Chinese survey ship

Type 646 hydrographic survey ship with NATO reporting name Kanyang (勘洋, meaning Surveying Oceans) class is a type of survey vessel currently in service with the People's Liberation Army Navy (PLAN).

Type 646 Kanyang class survey ship is designed by the 4th Directorate of the 708th Institute of China State Shipbuilding Corporation (CSSC), which is also more commonly known as China Shipbuilding and Oceanic Engineering Design Academy (中国船舶及海洋工程设计研究) nowadays. Construction of both ships begun simultaneously in December 1978 and both were launched in 1982, and both entered service with PLAN South Sea Fleet in 1978. In comparison to earlier shps converted from fishing and cargo vessels, these purposely designed ships carried more equipment and greatly improved efficiency. These ships are named as Nan-Ce (南测, meaning South Survey), followed by a three digit number. South means South Sea Fleet and Survey means that these ships are survey vessels. Specification:

- Length (m): 60
- Displacement (t): 676
- Speed (kt): 15.51
- Survey speed (kt): 3 – 4

Type	Pennant #	Builder	Laid down	Launched	Commissioned	Status	Fleet
646	Nan-Ce 426	Guijiang Shipyard	Dec 1978	Jul 25, 1982	1983	Active	South Sea Fleet
646	Nan-Ce 428	Guijiang Shipyard	Dec 1978	Dec 26, 1982	1983	Active	South Sea Fleet
