= Maling River =

- Location in Guangxi
- Native name: 马岭河 (Chinese)

Physical characteristics
- Source: Jiaqiao Range (架桥岭)
  - location: Pulu Yao Ethnic Township, Lipu, Guangxi
- Mouth: Lipu River
  - location: Dongchang Town, Lipu, Guangxi
  - coordinates: 24°34′51″N 110°30′49″E
- Length: 69 km (43 mi)
- Basin size: 600 km^{2} (230 mi^{2})

Basin features
- Waterbodies: Great River Reservoir (大江水库)

Chinese name
- Traditional Chinese: 馬嶺河
- Simplified Chinese: 马岭河
Transcriptions
Standard Mandarin
- Hanyu Pinyin: Mǎlǐng Hé

Maling River (Chinese: 马岭河; pinyin: Mǎlǐng Hé) is a river in northern Lipu, in Guangxi, China. It is 69 square kilometres (27 mi^{2}) long and is a tributary of the Lipu River, draining an area of 600 square kilometres (230 sq mi). It rises in northwestern Lipu, and flows generally southeast, passing through the towns of Hualong, Shuangjiang and Maling and joining the Lipu River in the town of Dongchang.
