= Hongshui River =

River in Guangxi, China

Coordinates: 23°47′56″N 109°31′54″E

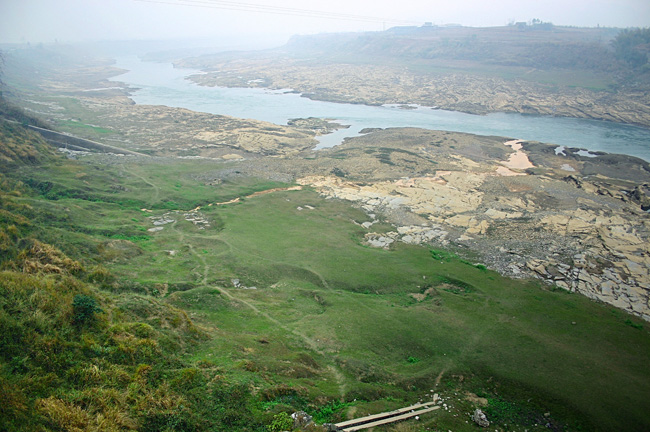

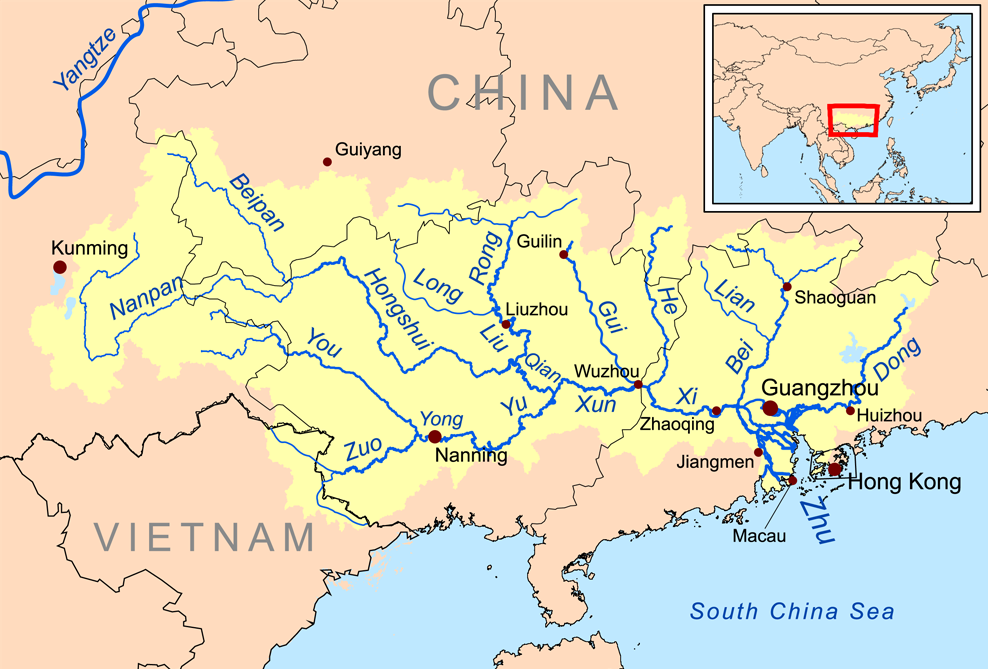

Location
- Country: China

Physical characteristics
- Source
  - location: Nanpan River
- 2nd source
  - location: Beipan River
- Mouth
  - location: Qian River near Laibin
- Length: 669.6 km (416.1 mi)
- Basin size: 141,674 km^{2} (54,701 sq mi)
- Discharge
  - average: 2,049 m^{3}/s (72,400 cu ft/s)

Basin features
- Tributaries
  - left: Meng, Caodu, Qingshui, Diao
  - right: Buliu

Hongshui River
- Traditional Chinese: 紅水河
- Simplified Chinese: 红水河
- Literal meaning: Redwater River
Transcriptions
Standard Mandarin
- Hanyu Pinyin: Hóngshuǐ Hé
- Wade–Giles: Hung-shui Ho

The Hongshui River is a major river in the Guangxi Zhuang Autonomous Region in Southern China. It is one of the main rivers in the basin of the Xi River, which in its turn is one of the main tributaries of the Pearl River. Because it flows through the red rock series area, the river is reddish brown, hence the name Hongshui River (lit. 'red water river').

Conventionally, the Hongshui River is formed by the merging of the Beipan and Nanpan Rivers (Beipanjiang and Nanpanjiang, i.e., the Northern and Southern Pan Rivers) at the Guizhou-Guangxi border. From there, it flows in the general southeastern direction. In Laibin Prefecture in central Guangxi the Hongshui merges with the Liu River that comes from the north, forming the Qian River, which continues to the east toward, eventually, the Xi River.

The Hongshui has 10 large dams on it, that provide electric power and flood control.

According to the Beijing Review the Hongshui River had 300 shoals that interfered with navigating the river with cargo vessels. Several of the dams are equipped with ship lifts capable of lifting vessels of 300 tons displacement.

Dams on the Hongshui River
name	cascade	date started	Megawatts	height	vessel capacity
Dahua Dam	-	1975	600 MW	83.28m	
Yantan Dam	5th	1984	1210 MW	110m	250-ton ship lift
Bailongtan Dam		-	192 MW	-	250-ton lock
Pingban Dam	3rd				
Xijing Dam	1st	1958	-	-	1000-ton lock
Longtan Dam	=	2009	4,900 MW	192m	300-ton ship lift
