= Qian River =

Coordinates: 23°24′7″N 110°5′47″E

Qian Jiang
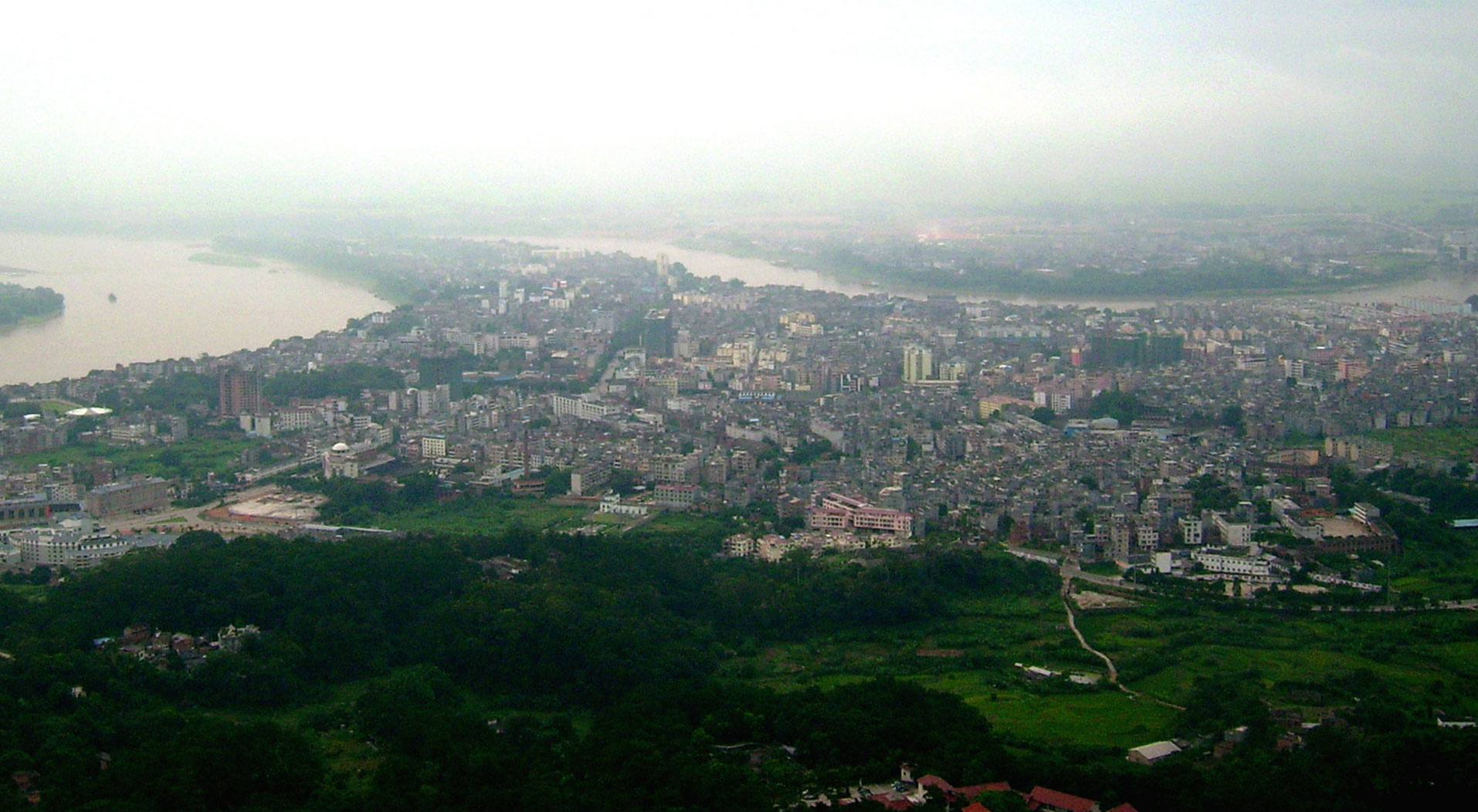
- Qian River (left) at the confluence with the Yu Jiang (right), forming the Xun Jiang

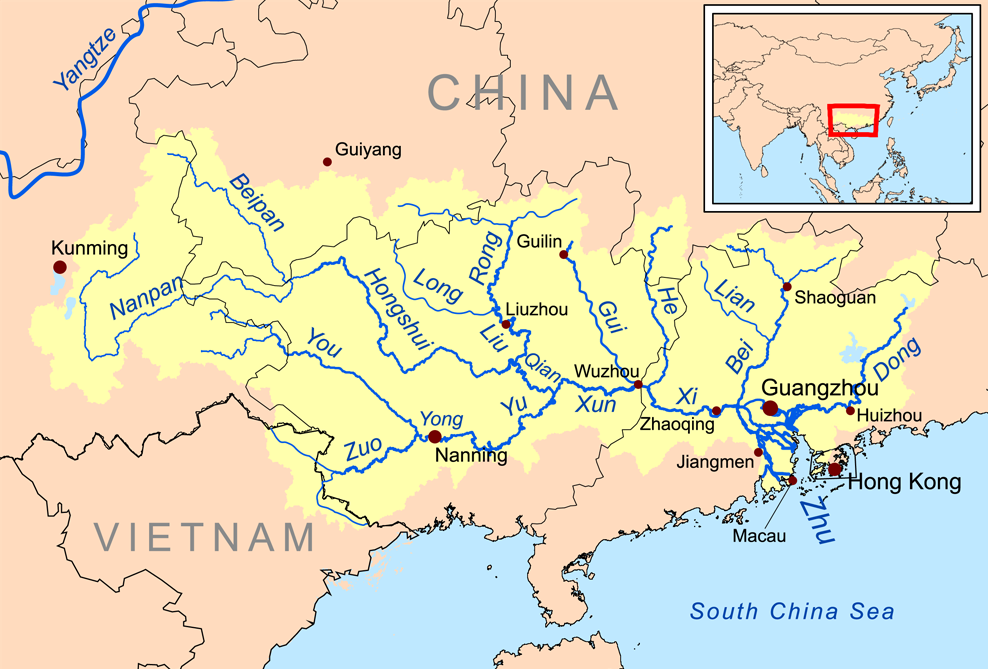
- Map of the Pearl River system

Location
- Country: China

Physical characteristics
- Mouth
  - location: Xun Jiang at Guiping
- Length: 121 km (75 mi)

The Qian River (Chinese: 黔江; pinyin: Qián Jiāng) is the name of a short section of the Xi River system and, thus, the greater Pearl River system in Guangxi, China. It is formed by where the Liu Jiang meets the larger Hongshui He east of Laibin, then flows southeast through Wuxuan. At Guiping it is joined by the more southerly Yu Jiang to form the Xun branch of the Xi Jiang. The Qian, for most of its length, winds between the Dayao and Lianhua Mountains, before entering the valley just below Xishan Mountain west of Guiping.

The river's landscape features the Dayao and Lianhua Mountains and is currently known for the Gorge Water Conservancy Project, which includes a massive dam for flood control and power generation, an operational hydroelectric plant named Qiaogong is also located in the Qianjiang area of Laibin.
