= Yu River (Guangxi) =

River in Guangxi, China

Coordinates: 23°23′55″N 110°05′54″E

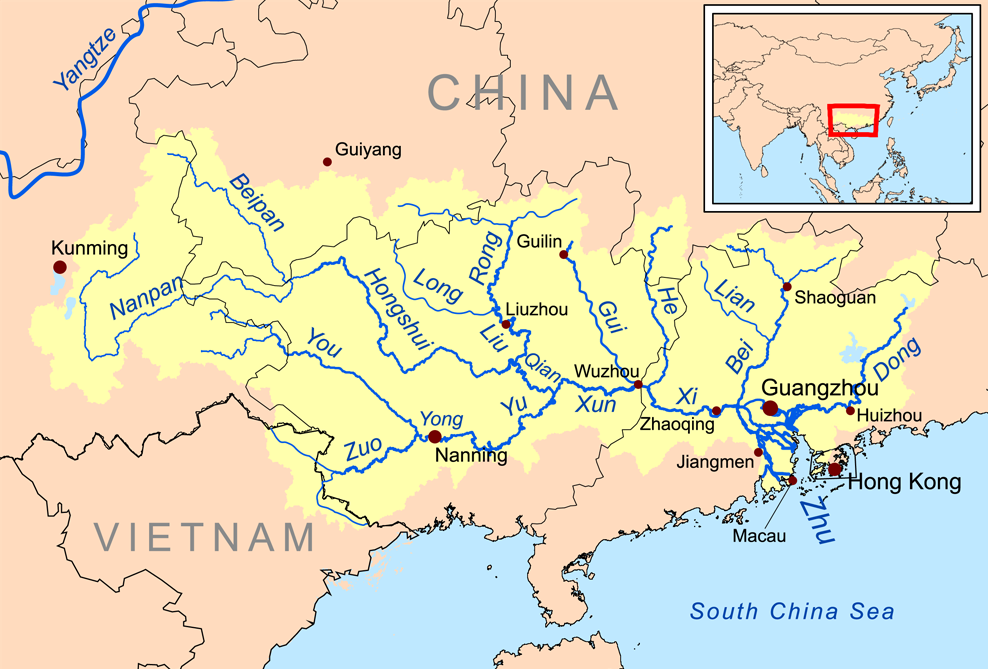

The Yu River (郁江 or 鬱江) (also called the Siang River) is a river in the south of China. It rises in two branches - the Zuo River (左江) and the You River (右江). The You flows roughly southeast from its sources in Yunnan province, the Tuoniang River (north) and the Xiyang River (south), which combine in the south of Tianlin County under the jurisdiction of Baise City in Guangxi. The Zuo flows northeast, also from two sources which begin in Vietnam. These are the Bằng River (known as Shuikuo in its lower course in China), which flows through Cao Bằng from the northwest, and the larger Kỳ Cùng River (known as Ping'er in its lower course in China) that originates from the southwest. After the confluence of said You and Zuo rivers the stream is then known as the Yong Jiang (邕江) as it flows through Nanning before becoming the Yu. The Yu itself runs roughly northeast before joining the Qian River (黔江) at Guiping to form the Xun River.

The Yong-Yu river proper flows some 412 km (256 mi) along a sinuous course until reaching Guiping as a tributary of the Xi River system.
