= Yantan Dam =

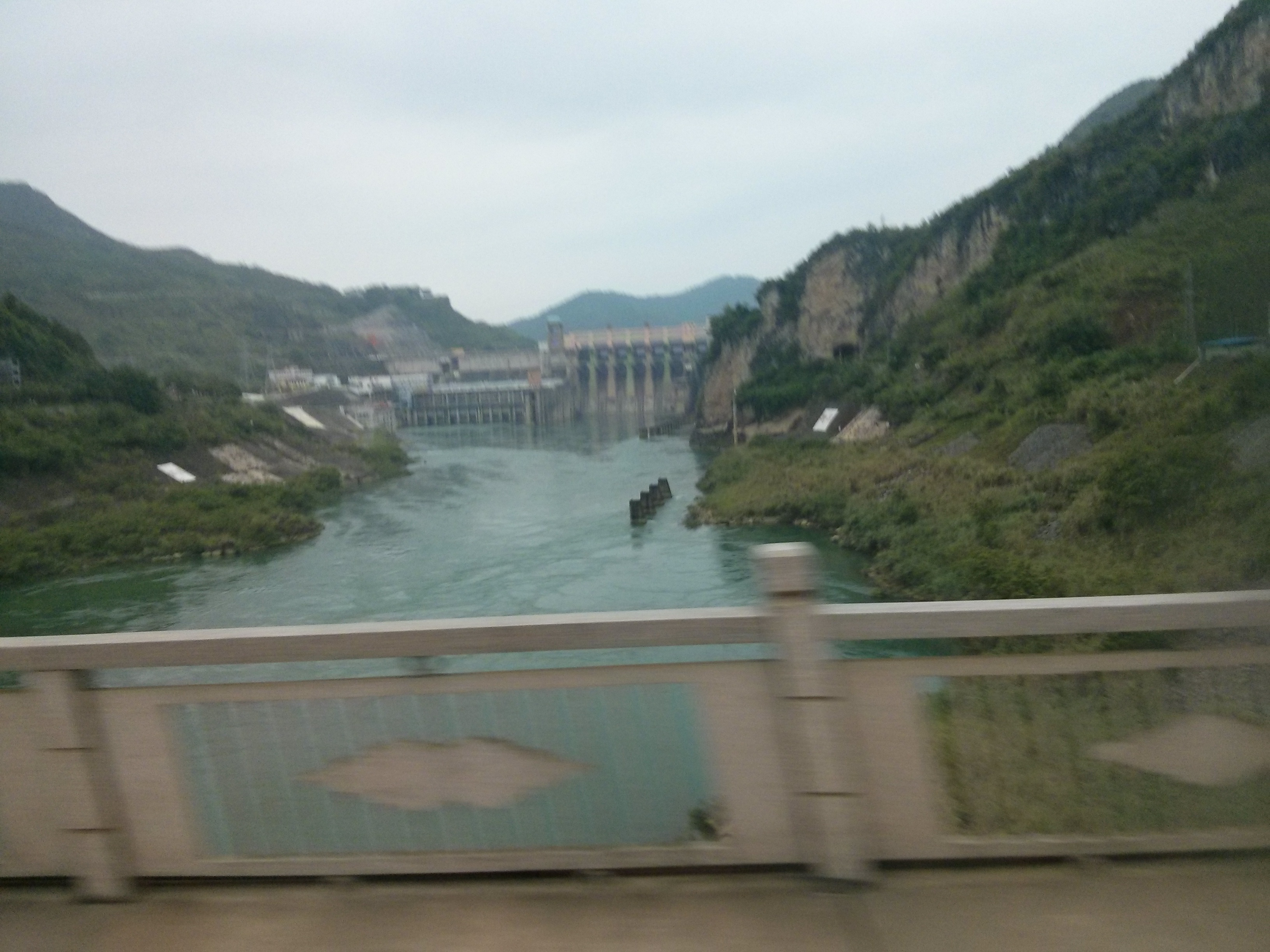

- Location within China
- Country: China
- Location: Dahua Yao Autonomous County, Guangxi
- Coordinates: 24°02′26″N 107°30′43″E
- Status: In use
- Construction began: 1985
- Opening date: 1995
- Owner: Guangxi Electric Power Bureau

Dam and spillways
- Type of dam: Gravity
- Impounds: Hongshui River
- Height: 110 m (361 ft)
- Length: 525 m (1,722 ft)
- Spillways: 7
- Spillway type: Service, crest overflow
- Spillway capacity: 33,400 m^{3}/s (1,179,510 cu ft/s)

Reservoir
- Creates: Yantan Reservoir
- Total capacity: 2,612,000,000 m^{3} (2,117,583 acre⋅ft)
- Catchment area: 106,580 km^{2} (41,151 sq mi)
- Surface area: 107.5 km^{2} (42 sq mi)

Power Station
- Commission date: 1992-1995
- Hydraulic head: 85 m (279 ft) (max.)
- Turbines: 4 x 302.5 MW Francis turbines
- Installed capacity: 1,210 MW
- Annual generation: 56.6 million kWh

The Yantan Dam (Chinese: 岩滩大坝; pinyin: Yántān Dàbà) is a gravity dam on the Hongshui River near Dahua County, Guangxi China. The main purpose of the dam is hydroelectric power production and it has an associated 1,210 MW power station consisting of 4 x 302.5 MW Francis turbine-generators.

== Construction ==
The dam was placed on the state key project list in 1984 and construction began in March 1985. By November 1987, the river was diverted and in March 1992, the dam began to impound the reservoir. On September 16, 1992, the first generator was operational nine months ahead of schedule. The second generator was operation in August 1993, the third in June 1994 and the fourth in June 1995. By the end of 1995, the entire project was complete. The dam is owned by Guangxi Electric Power Bureau while Guangxi Electricpower Investigation and Design Institute designed it and Guangxi Yantan Hydropower Project Construction Corporation constructed it. 43,176 people were relocated as a result of the project.

== Design ==
The facility is composed of the dam, its power station and a ship lift. The dam is a 110 m (361 ft) high and 525 m (1,722 ft) long gravity dam. It withholds a reservoir with a normal capacity of 2,612,000,000 m^{3} (2,117,583 acre⋅ft), maximum capacity of 3,432,000,000 m^{3} (2,782,368 acre⋅ft) and active or "useful" storage of 1,572,000,000 m^{3} (1,274,441 acre⋅ft). The dam's spillway contains seven radial steel gates with a maximum discharge capacity of 33,400 m^{3}/s (1,179,510 cu ft/s). The power station at its right toe is 200 m (656 ft) long, 60 m (197 ft) wide and 72 m (236 ft) high. The power station is supported by four intakes, penstocks and tailraces. It contains 4 x 302.5 MW Francis turbines for an installed capacity of 1,210 but operates at a firm capacity of 242 MW. The Yantan Ship Lift is a vertical lift type designed for a maximum 250 ton barge vessel.

== See also ==
- List of power stations in China
