= Gui River =

Gui River Guì Jiāng
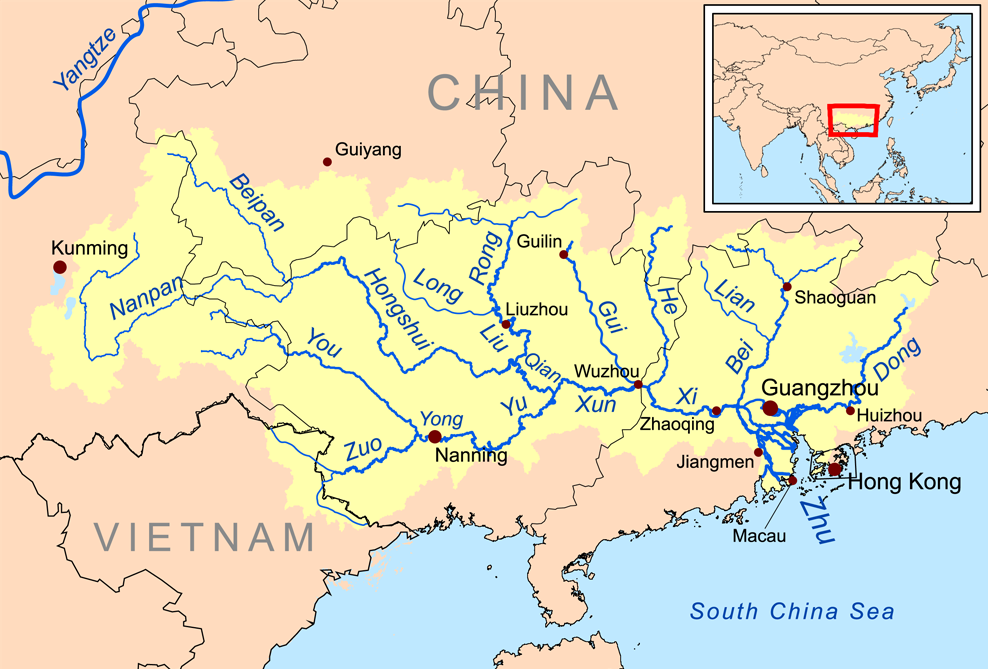
- The Gui River in the Pearl River watershed
- Native name: 桂江

Location
- Country: China
- State: Guangxi

Physical characteristics
- Source: Confluence of the Li and Lipu Rivers
  - location: Pingle, Guangxi, China
  - coordinates: 24.6358°N 110.6106°E
- Mouth: Xi River
  - location: Wuzhou, Guangxi, China
  - coordinates: 23.4680°N 111.3096°E
- Length: 426 km (265 mi)
- Basin size: 18,200 km^{2} (7,000 sq mi)
- Discharge
  - average: 767 m^{3}/s (27,100 cu ft/s)

The Gui River (Chinese: 桂江; pinyin: Guì Jiāng) is a river in the Guangxi Zhuang Autonomous Region of China, and a tributary of the Xi Jiang. It is formed in Pingle by the confluence of the Li River and Lipu River and flows southeast, merging with the Xun Jiang to form the Xi at Wuzhou.
