= Yantan Ship Lift =

The Yantan Ship Lift is a large ship lift located on the Hongshui River, a tributary of the Pearl River in China. The ship lift's basin can carry vessels of up to 250 tons. The ship lift's basin is 40 metres (130 ft) × 10.8 metres (35 ft) × 1.8 metres (5.9 ft). It lifts vessels 68.5 metres (225 ft). It is an example of a Vertical Hoist Shiplift.

The ship lift is part of the Yantan Hydroelectric Project, and was completed in 1986. The dam was built with the assistance of the World Bank.
