= Xun River =

Coordinates: 23°28′5″N 111°18′20″E

Xun Jiang
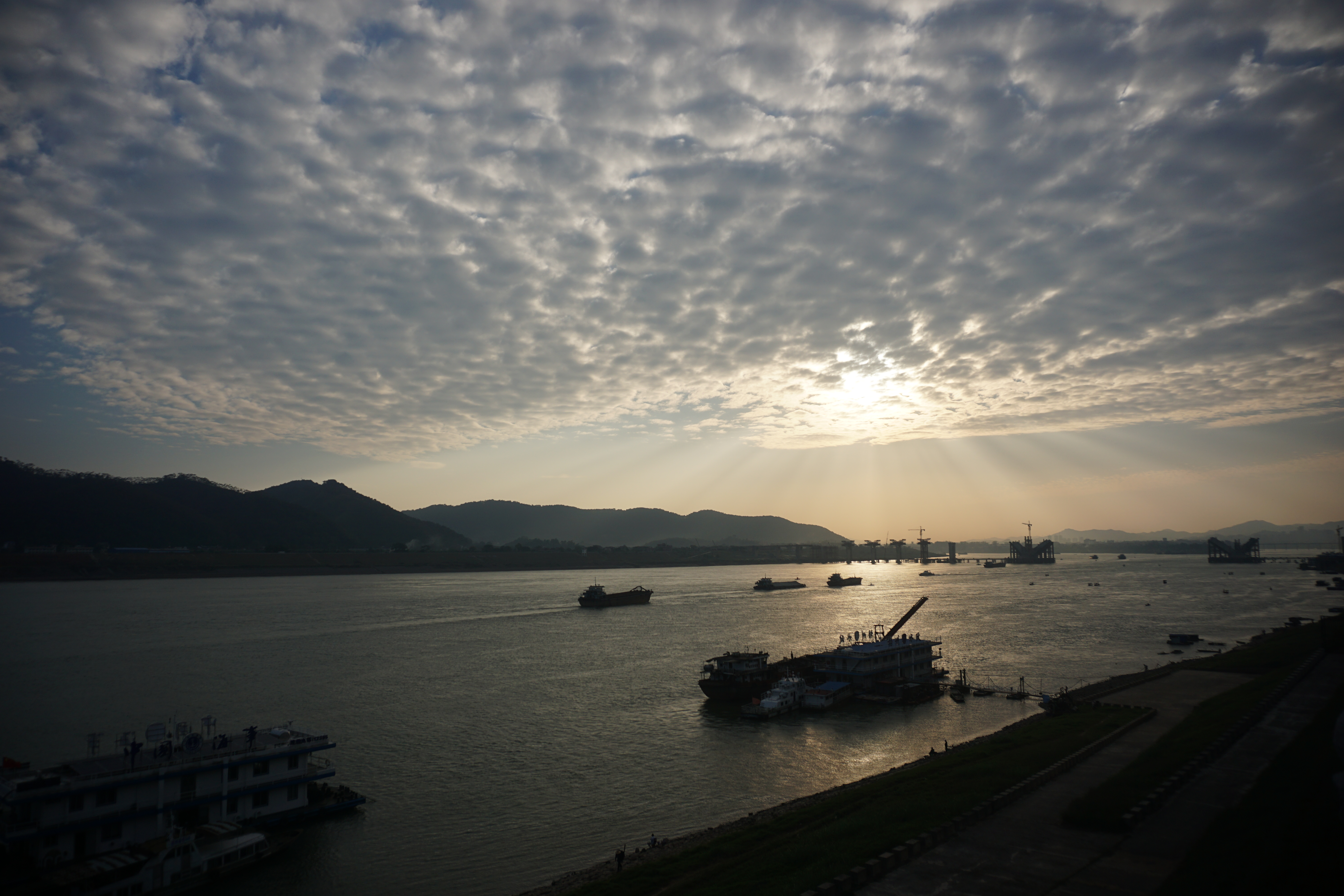
- The final stretch of the Xun River in Wuzhou, before the confluence with Gui Jiang, forming the Xi Jiang. View is upstream.

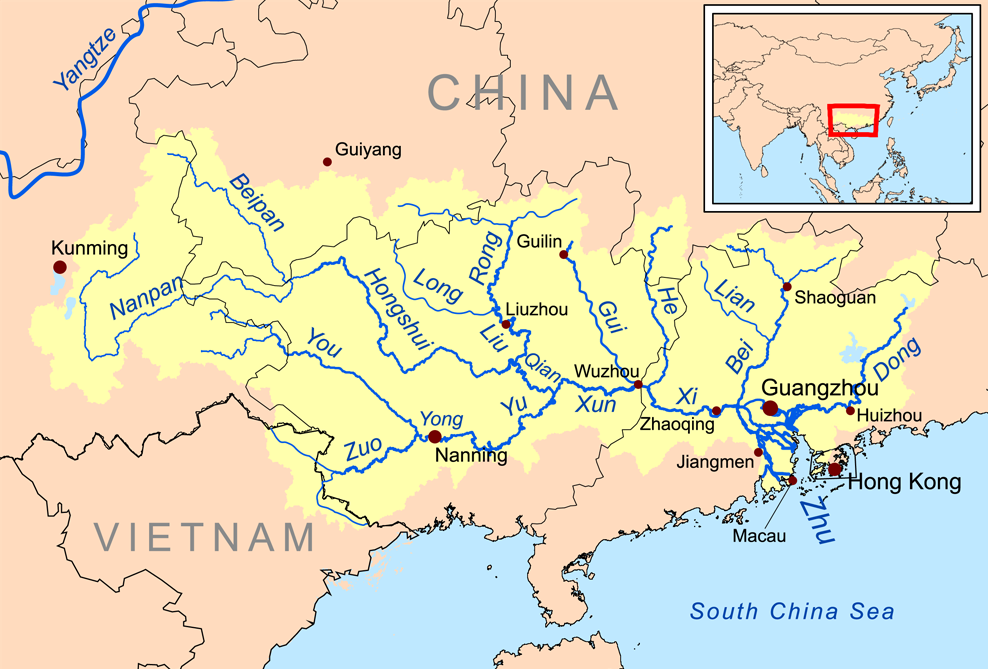
- Map of the Pearl River system

Location
- Country: China and Vietnam

Physical characteristics
- Source
  - location: Guiping
- Mouth
  - location: Xi Jiang at Wuzhou
- Length: 172 km (107 mi)

Basin features
- Tributaries
  - left: Meng Jiang
  - right: Beiliu Jiang

The Xun River (Chinese: 浔江, pinyin: Xún Jiāng, jyutping: Cham^{4} Gong^{1}) is a short section of the main branch of the Pearl River system upstream from the Xi Jiang in China. Although less than 200 km long, it is of considerable importance in Guangxi Province as it drains the majority of the province. The Xun River in name is formed by the confluence of the Yu and Qian rivers, with the Qian being the greater of the two tributaries. The Xun then flows out of Guiping and through Pingnan, finally joining with the Gui Jiang in Wuzhou to form the Xi Jiang. The Xun is also a section of the Pearl's longest tributary.

The Xun River flows from west to east roughly along the Tropic of Cancer.
