= Lipu River =

River in Guangxi Autonomous Region, China

- Location in Guangxi
- Native name: 荔浦河 (Chinese)

Physical characteristics
- Source: Mount Dayao
  - location: Zhongliang Township, Jinxiu Yao Autonomous County, Guangxi
- Mouth: Li River
  - location: Pingle Town, Pingle County, Guangxi
  - coordinates: 24°38′08″N 110°36′28″E
- Length: 121 km (75 mi)
- Basin size: 2,038 km^{2} (787 mi^{2})

Chinese name
- Chinese: 荔浦河
Transcriptions
Standard Mandarin
- Hanyu Pinyin: Lìpǔ Hé

Changtan River
- Traditional Chinese: 長灘河
- Simplified Chinese: 长滩河
Transcriptions
Standard Mandarin
- Hanyu Pinyin: Chángtān Hé

Xiuren River
- Chinese: 修仁河
Transcriptions
Standard Mandarin
- Hanyu Pinyin: Xiūrén Hé

Lipu River (Chinese: 荔浦河; pinyin: Lìpǔ Hé), also known as Changtan River (长滩河; Chángtān Hé) and Xiuren River (修仁河; Xiūrén Hé), is a tributary of the Li River in northern Guangxi, China. It is 121 kilometres (75 mi) long and drains an area of 2,038 square kilometres (787 sq mi). The river rises in Mount Dayao in Zhongliang Township, Jinxiu Yao Autonomous County, and flows generally north through the towns of Xiuren and Licheng of Lipu, past the town of Pingle County, where it flows into the Li River from the west.
