= Yong River (Guangxi) =

River in Guangxi, China

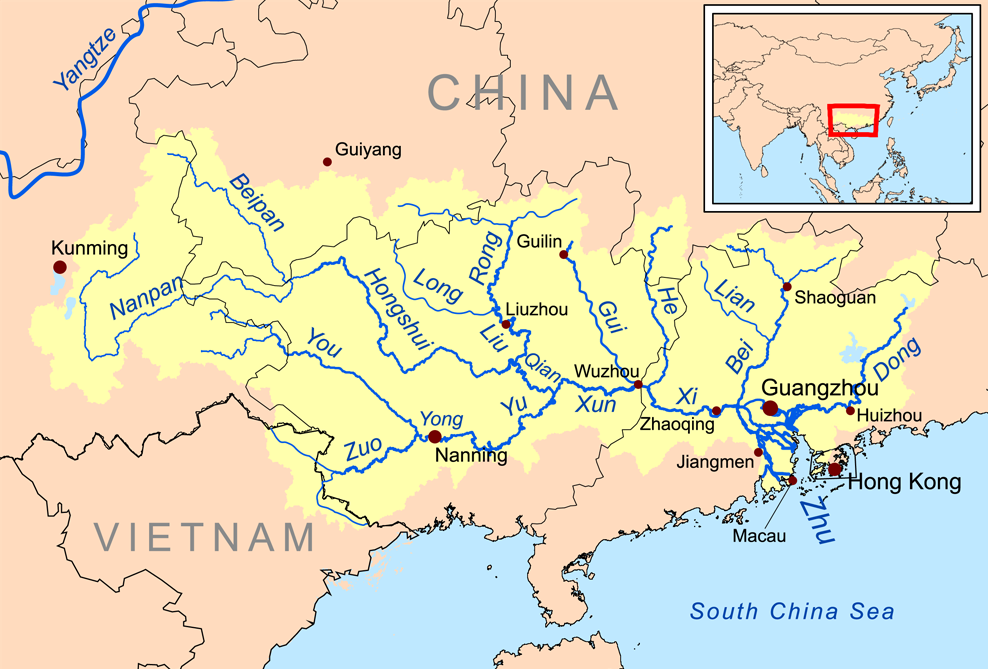
Watershed of the Pearl River

The Yong River (Chinese: 邕江; pinyin: Yǒng Jiāng) is a river of China, located in Nanning, Guangxi Zhuang Autonomous Region. It joins into the Yu River and flows into the South China Sea.

== See also ==
- Yong River (Chinese: 甬江) in Zhejiang
- Yongjinglong
- List of rivers in China
