= Xing'an County =

Xing'an County 兴安县 Hingan (Note: Infrequently, it was formerly romanized as Hing-gan.)
- County
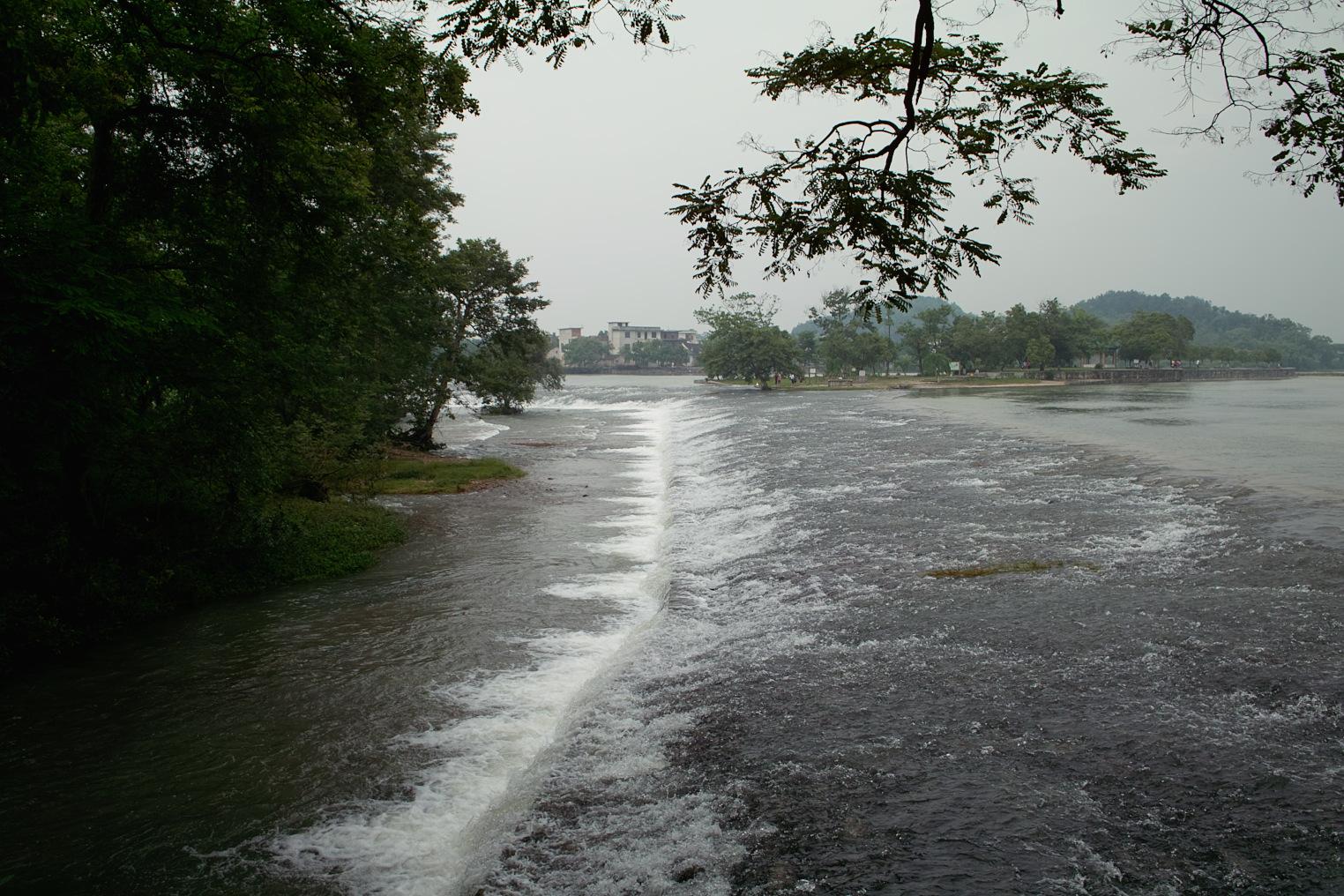

- Location of the seat in Guangxi
- Coordinates: 25°36′43″N 110°40′19″E
- Country: China
- Autonomous region: Guangxi
- Prefecture-level city: Guilin
- County seat: Xing'an Town

Area
  - Total: 2,348 km^{2} (907 sq mi)
- Time zone: UTC+8 (China Standard)

Xing'an
- Traditional Chinese: 興安縣
- Simplified Chinese: 兴安县
Transcriptions
Standard Mandarin
- Hanyu Pinyin: Xīng'ān xiàn
- Wade–Giles: Hsing-an

Xing'an County is a county in the northeast of Guangxi Zhuang Autonomous Region, China. It is administered as part of the prefecture-level city of Guilin. Its area is 2,348 square kilometers (907 sq mi), with a population of 370,000. The postal code is 541300.

== Administrative divisions ==
Xing'an County is divided into 6 towns, 3 townships and 1 ethnic township:

towns

- Xing'an Town 兴安镇
- Xiangli Town 湘漓镇
- Jieshou Town 界首镇
- Gaoshang Town 高尚镇
- Yanguan Town 严关镇
- Rongjiang Town 溶江镇

townships

- Mochuan Township 漠川乡
- Baishi Township 白石乡
- Cuijia Township 崔家乡

ethnic township

- Huajiang Yao Ethnic Township 华江瑶族乡

== Climate ==
Climate data for Xing'an, elevation 224 m (735 ft), (1991–2020 normals, extremes 1981–2010)
Month	Jan	Feb	Mar	Apr	May	Jun	Jul	Aug	Sep	Oct	Nov	Dec	Year
Record high °C (°F)	25.8 (78.4)	30.7 (87.3)	33.0 (91.4)	34.1 (93.4)	35.5 (95.9)	36.5 (97.7)	39.1 (102.4)	38.9 (102.0)	37.5 (99.5)	34.8 (94.6)	32.0 (89.6)	26.4 (79.5)	39.1 (102.4)
Mean daily maximum °C (°F)	10.4 (50.7)	13.1 (55.6)	16.6 (61.9)	23.1 (73.6)	27.3 (81.1)	30.1 (86.2)	32.6 (90.7)	32.7 (90.9)	29.7 (85.5)	24.9 (76.8)	19.5 (67.1)	13.5 (56.3)	22.8 (73.0)
Daily mean °C (°F)	7.0 (44.6)	9.4 (48.9)	12.8 (55.0)	18.7 (65.7)	22.8 (73.0)	25.9 (78.6)	27.8 (82.0)	27.6 (81.7)	24.8 (76.6)	20.1 (68.2)	14.6 (58.3)	9.2 (48.6)	18.4 (65.1)
Mean daily minimum °C (°F)	4.6 (40.3)	6.9 (44.4)	10.2 (50.4)	15.6 (60.1)	19.7 (67.5)	23.1 (73.6)	24.5 (76.1)	24.2 (75.6)	21.3 (70.3)	16.5 (61.7)	11.2 (52.2)	6.1 (43.0)	15.3 (59.6)
Record low °C (°F)	−3.0 (26.6)	−2.3 (27.9)	−1.1 (30.0)	4.1 (39.4)	8.7 (47.7)	14.0 (57.2)	17.3 (63.1)	18.8 (65.8)	12.1 (53.8)	4.3 (39.7)	0.4 (32.7)	−5.3 (22.5)	−5.3 (22.5)
Average precipitation mm (inches)	84.8 (3.34)	105.3 (4.15)	187.7 (7.39)	226.4 (8.91)	347.8 (13.69)	363.8 (14.32)	204.3 (8.04)	144.7 (5.70)	69.5 (2.74)	65.6 (2.58)	92.8 (3.65)	61.6 (2.43)	1,954.3 (76.94)
Average precipitation days (≥ 0.1 mm)	14.5	14.9	20.4	18.7	18.5	18.7	15.1	12.7	8.6	7.8	9.6	10.5	170
Average snowy days	1.7	0.8	0.1	0	0	0	0	0	0	0	0	0.5	3.1
Average relative humidity (%)	77	78	82	81	81	84	79	78	76	73	73	72	78
Mean monthly sunshine hours	51.5	47.1	52.0	77.2	102.5	106.3	170.7	185.3	157.6	133.8	109.8	92.3	1,286.1
Percentage possible sunshine	16	15	14	20	25	26	41	46	43	38	34	28	29
Source: China Meteorological Administration
