= Pingle County =

Pingle County 平乐县 · Bingzloz Yen Pinglo
- County
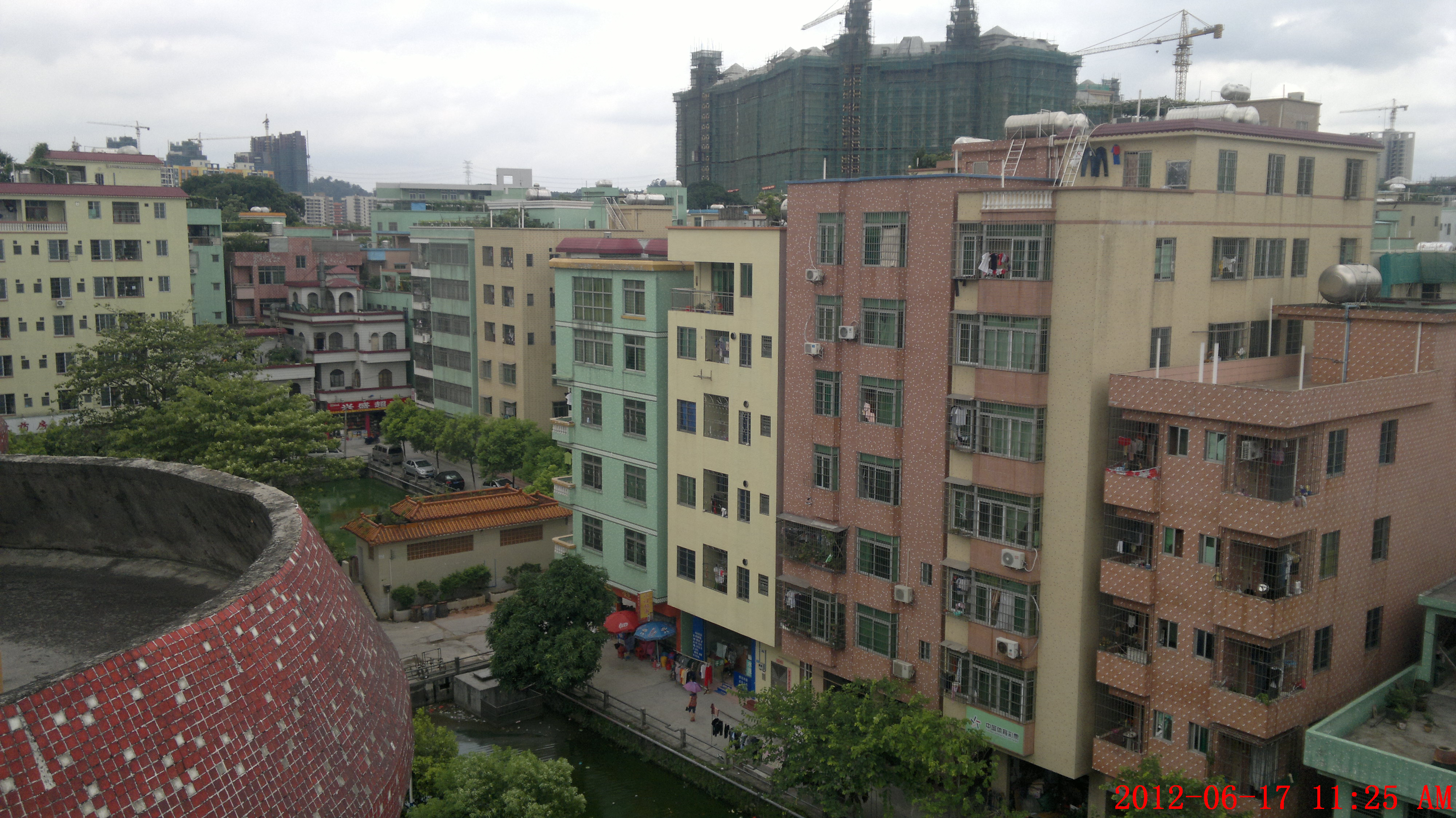

- Location of the seat in Guangxi
- Coordinates: 24°37′59″N 110°38′35″E
- Country: China
- Autonomous region: Guangxi
- Prefecture-level city: Guilin
- County seat: Pingle Town

Area
  - Total: 1,919.34 km^{2} (741.06 sq mi)
- Time zone: UTC+8 (China Standard)

Pingle County (simplified Chinese: 平乐县; traditional Chinese: 平樂縣; pinyin: Pínglè Xiàn; Zhuang: Bingzloz Yen) is a county in the northeast of Guangxi, China. It is under the administration of Guilin city.

== Administrative divisions ==
Pingle County is divided into 6 towns, 3 townships and 1 ethnic township:

towns

- Pingle Town 平乐镇
- Ertang Town 二塘镇
- Shazi Town 沙子镇
- Tong'an Town 同安镇
- Zhangjia Town 张家镇
- Yuantou Town 源头镇

townships

- Yang'an Township 阳安乡
- Qinglong Township 青龙乡
- Qiaoting Township 桥亭乡

ethnic township

- Dafa Yao Ethnic Township 大发瑶族乡

== Climate ==
Climate data for Pingle, elevation 158 m (518 ft), (1991–2020 normals, extremes 1981–2010)
Month	Jan	Feb	Mar	Apr	May	Jun	Jul	Aug	Sep	Oct	Nov	Dec	Year
Record high °C (°F)	27.7 (81.9)	31.3 (88.3)	34.7 (94.5)	34.5 (94.1)	36.0 (96.8)	38.0 (100.4)	40.6 (105.1)	39.6 (103.3)	38.1 (100.6)	36.5 (97.7)	34.1 (93.4)	29.1 (84.4)	40.6 (105.1)
Mean daily maximum °C (°F)	13.8 (56.8)	16.3 (61.3)	19.4 (66.9)	25.2 (77.4)	29.3 (84.7)	31.6 (88.9)	33.6 (92.5)	33.8 (92.8)	31.7 (89.1)	27.8 (82.0)	22.6 (72.7)	16.8 (62.2)	25.2 (77.3)
Daily mean °C (°F)	9.8 (49.6)	12.2 (54.0)	15.4 (59.7)	20.8 (69.4)	24.7 (76.5)	27.2 (81.0)	28.7 (83.7)	28.4 (83.1)	26.4 (79.5)	22.2 (72.0)	17.0 (62.6)	11.7 (53.1)	20.4 (68.7)
Mean daily minimum °C (°F)	7.3 (45.1)	9.4 (48.9)	12.8 (55.0)	17.7 (63.9)	21.6 (70.9)	24.3 (75.7)	25.3 (77.5)	24.9 (76.8)	22.7 (72.9)	18.4 (65.1)	13.4 (56.1)	8.5 (47.3)	17.2 (62.9)
Record low °C (°F)	−1.1 (30.0)	−0.8 (30.6)	1.2 (34.2)	6.1 (43.0)	11.9 (53.4)	16.0 (60.8)	18.7 (65.7)	20.2 (68.4)	14.6 (58.3)	7.7 (45.9)	2.0 (35.6)	−2.4 (27.7)	−2.4 (27.7)
Average precipitation mm (inches)	71.7 (2.82)	57.3 (2.26)	120.9 (4.76)	153.8 (6.06)	224.6 (8.84)	277.6 (10.93)	159.5 (6.28)	154.6 (6.09)	66.8 (2.63)	57.1 (2.25)	60.4 (2.38)	50.7 (2.00)	1,455 (57.3)
Average precipitation days (≥ 0.1 mm)	12.4	12.3	16.5	16.2	16.4	19.2	16.0	14.1	8.5	6.2	8.4	9.0	155.2
Average snowy days	0.4	0.2	0	0	0	0	0	0	0	0	0	0.2	0.8
Average relative humidity (%)	77	78	81	80	80	81	78	78	75	72	74	73	77
Mean monthly sunshine hours	63.8	58.2	56.9	89.3	126.2	136.1	203.5	203.2	179.1	163.6	126.7	108.0	1,514.6
Percentage possible sunshine	19	18	15	23	31	33	49	51	49	46	39	33	34
Source: China Meteorological Administration
