= Guilin Scenic Area =

Landscape of Guilin, Guanxi

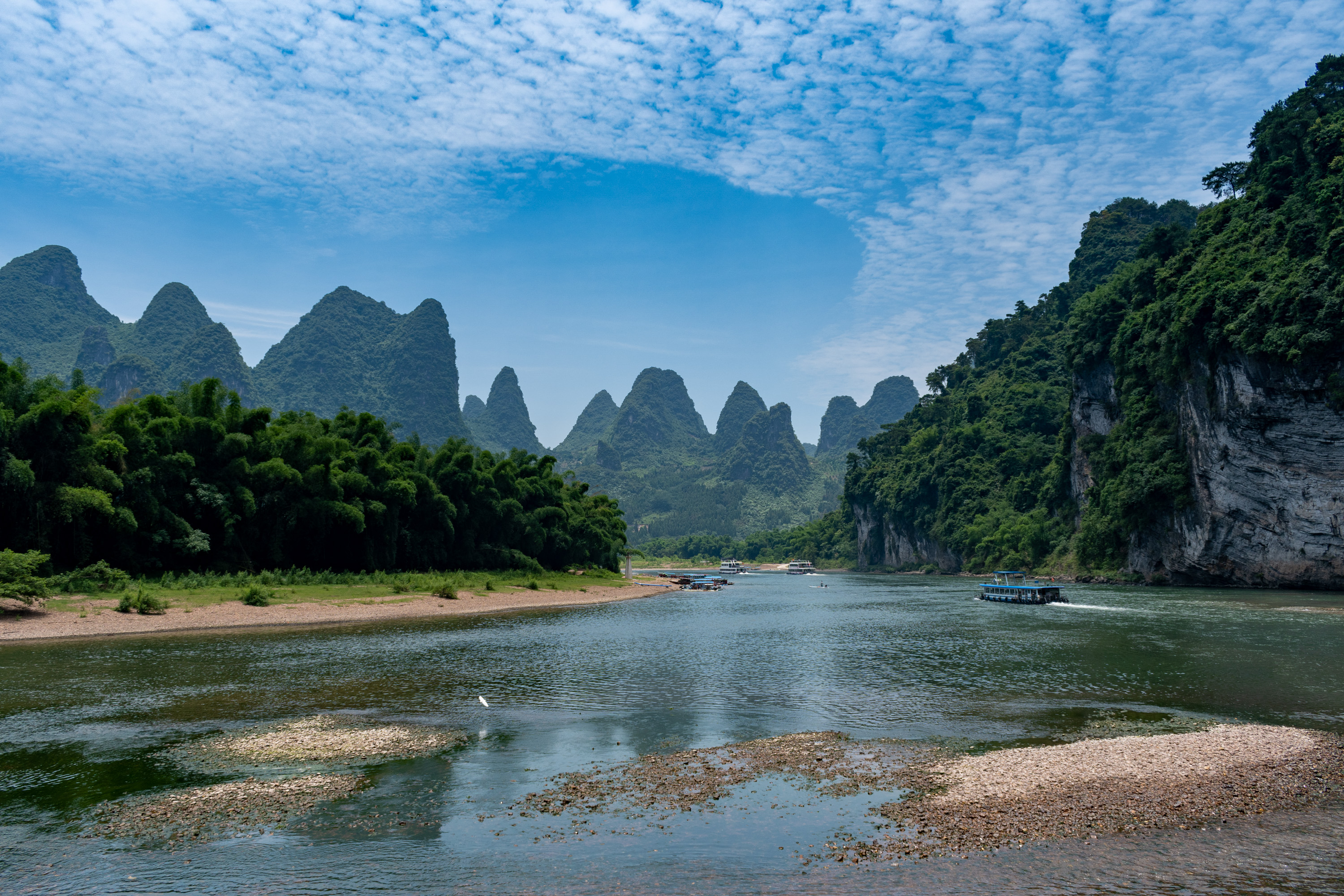
The emblem of Guilin's scenery: the Li River.

The scenic area of Guilin is a general term for tourism resources within Guilin, including numerous attractions. Guilin's landscape has long been renowned for its "green hills, clear water, fantastic caves, and beautiful mountains". The region's natural scenery is characterized by its mountains, rivers, karst caves, historic sites and stone carvings. On June 24, 2014, Guilin, along with Shibing in Guizhou, Mount Jinfo in Chongqing and Huanjiang in Guangxi, was inscribed on the World Heritage List as part of the South China Karst at the 38th World Heritage Conference.

== Mountains ==
The mountains and waters of Guilin.

The topography of Guilin is characterized by its karst limestone formations, with mountains predominantly composed of green stone and covered by evergreen vegetation. These mountains are noted for their distinctive and unusual shapes, integral to the region's natural heritage.

Key mountain attractions in Guilin include Elephant Trunk Hill, Fubo Hill, Diecai Hill and Nine Horses Hill.

== Caves ==
The caves of Guilin are karst formations, characterized by their winding paths and the presence of underground rivers that connect some of them. The interior landscapes of these caves are defined by the presence of stalactites and stalagmites.

Prominent karst caves in Guilin include Reed Flute Cave in Reed Flute Park, Seven-star Cave in Seven-star Park, Guan Cave in the suburbs, and Fengyu Cave in Lipu.

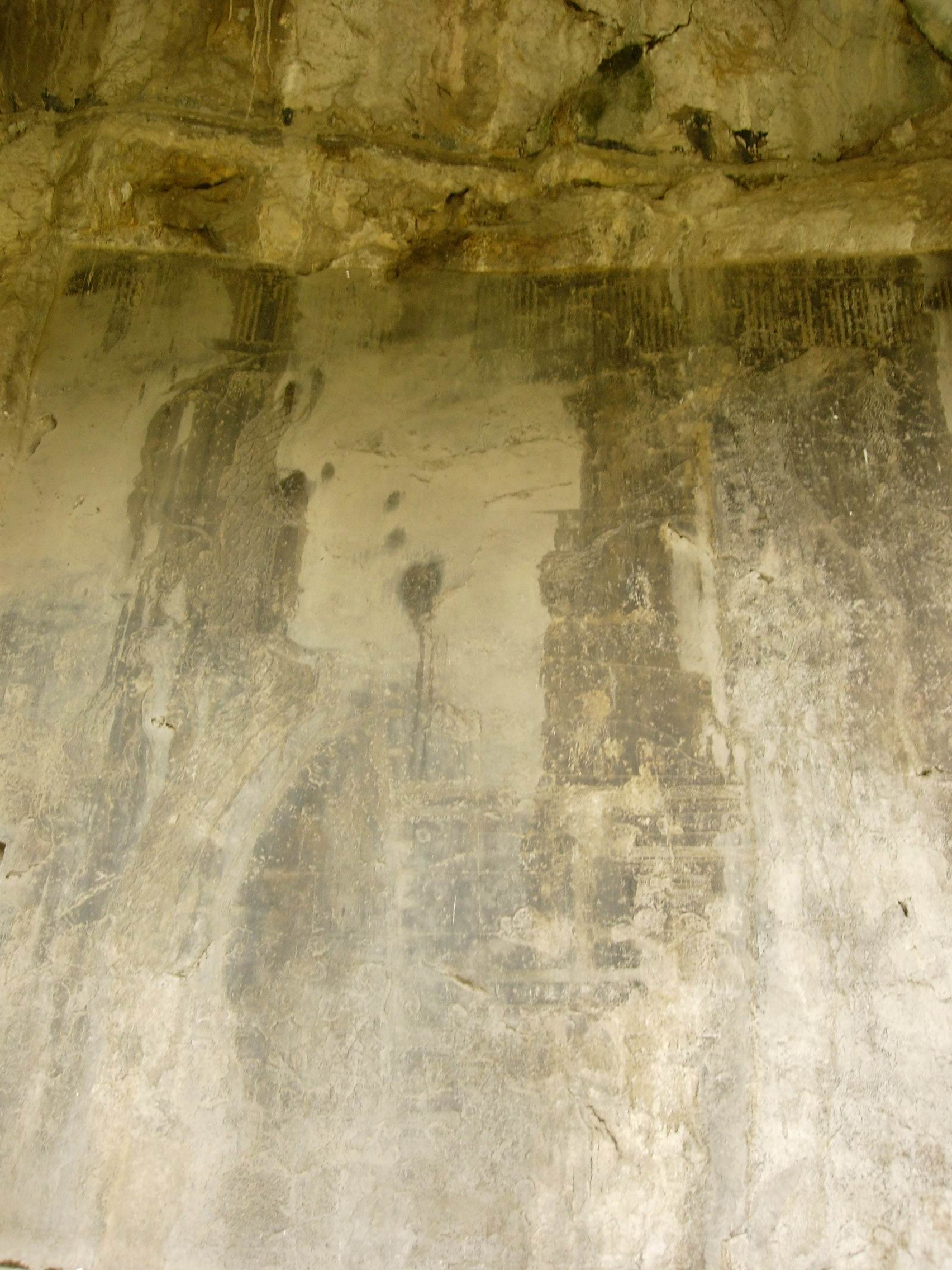
Old map of Jingjiang Prefecture City.

=== Stone carvings ===
Guilin's stone carvings, collectively referred to as Guilin Stone Carvings, are dispersed across various mountains within the city. These carvings include both rock carvings and rock statues. The former is widely distributed across the city's mountainous regions, while the latter is primarily found on Fubo Hill.

The majority of Guilin's rock carvings date back to the Tang and Song dynasties, with additional examples from the Qing dynasty and Republican era. The carvings have diverse content, including travelogues, historical records, and official announcements.

On Parrot Mountain, located in the northern part of Guilin, there is a Song dynasty stone carving called the "Map of Jingjiang Prefecture City," one of the earliest urban maps in China.

Within the Pearl Cave on Fubo Hill lies the "Self-Portrait of Mi Fu."

== Water ==
The majority of water bodies in Guilin comply with national secondary water quality standards, characterized by their clarity and transparency.

The main water attractions in Guilin include the Li River and the Two Rivers and Four Lakes.

=== Li River ===
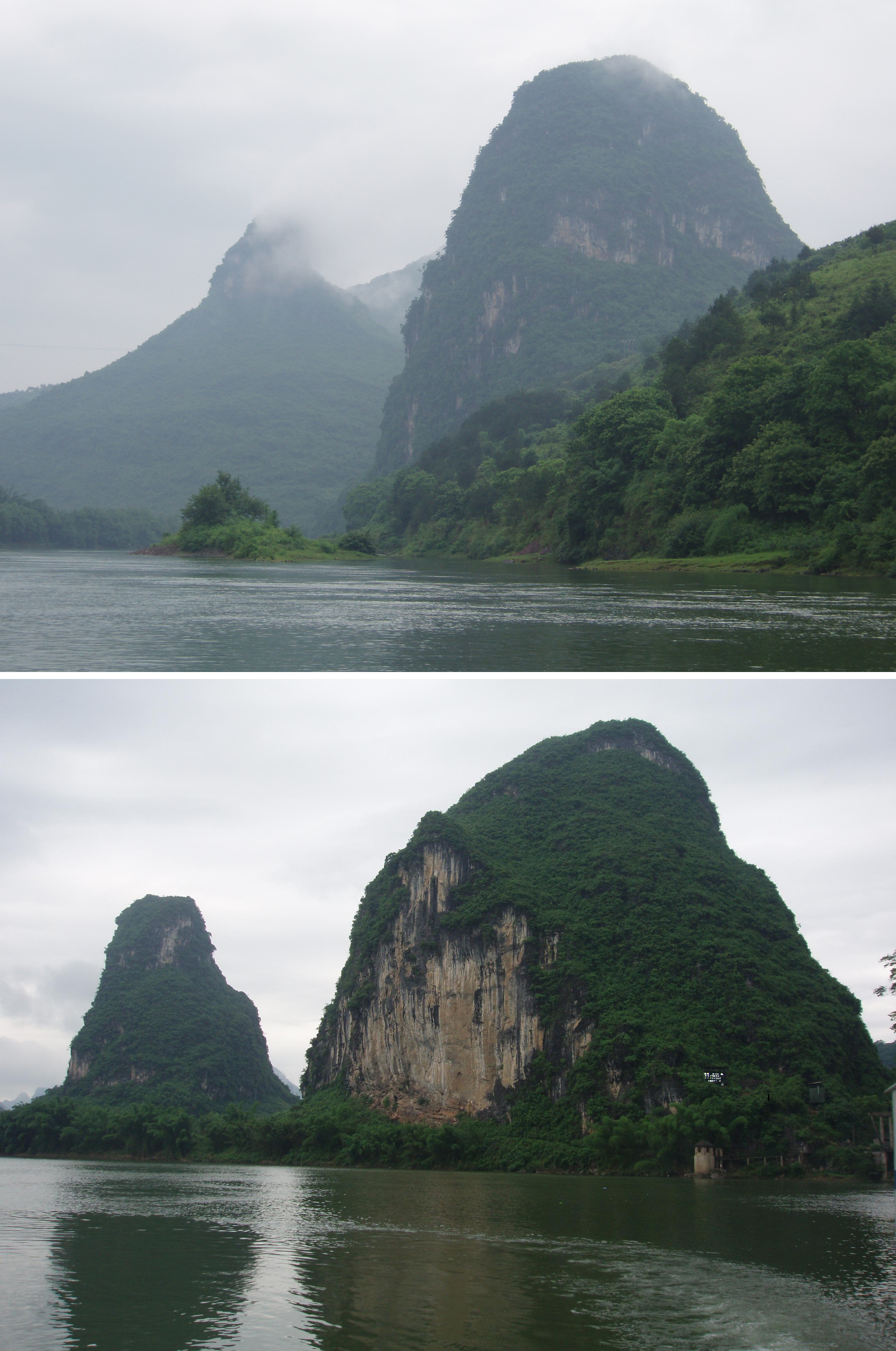
The mist-shrouded and clear Li River.

The Li River originates from Mao'er Mountains in Ziyuan County, Guilin. It belongs to the Pearl River system and flows southward through counties and cities such as Guilin and Yangshuo. After passing through Lipu, it is called the Gui River, continuing southward to merge with the Xi River in Wuzhou, with a total length of 426 kilometers.

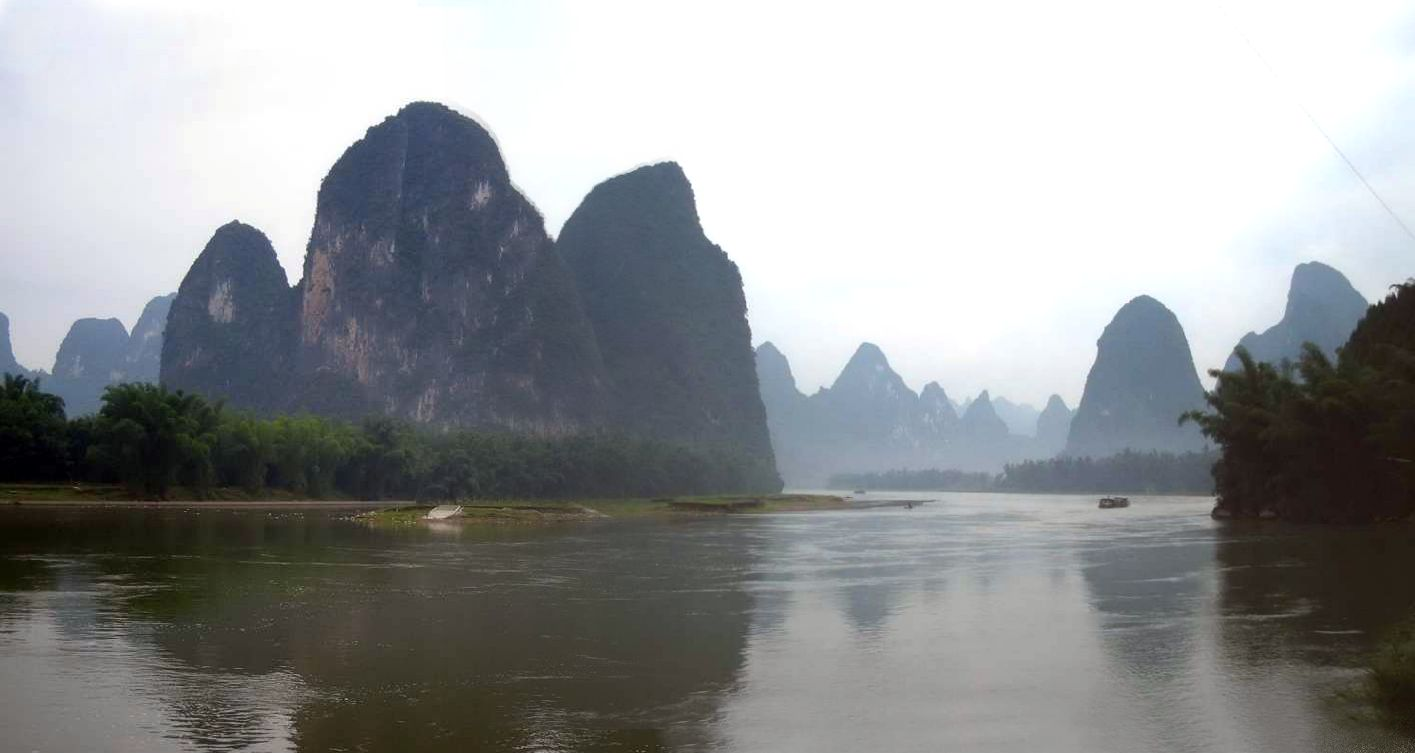
The real scene of Xingping Wharf on the Li River in Yangshuo.

The image on the back of the 20-yuan note of the fifth series of Renminbi issued by the People's Bank of China features the Li River in Guilin, located in Xingping Town, Yangshuo County.

The Li River and Xiang River are connected by the Lingqu Canal, which was dug during the Qin dynasty.

=== Two Rivers and Four Lakes ===
The Two Rivers and Four Lakes refer to the Li River, Taohua River, Rong Lake, Shan Lake, Gui Lake, and Mulong Lake, which together form the urban water system of Guilin and now serve as tourist attractions. Historically, these rivers and lakes were not interconnected, and some, such as those around Gui Lake, were severely silted. After over a decade of renovation, including large-scale natural lake dam construction and landscaping, the interconnected urban water system known as Two Rivers and Four Lakes was completed in 2001.

== Culture ==
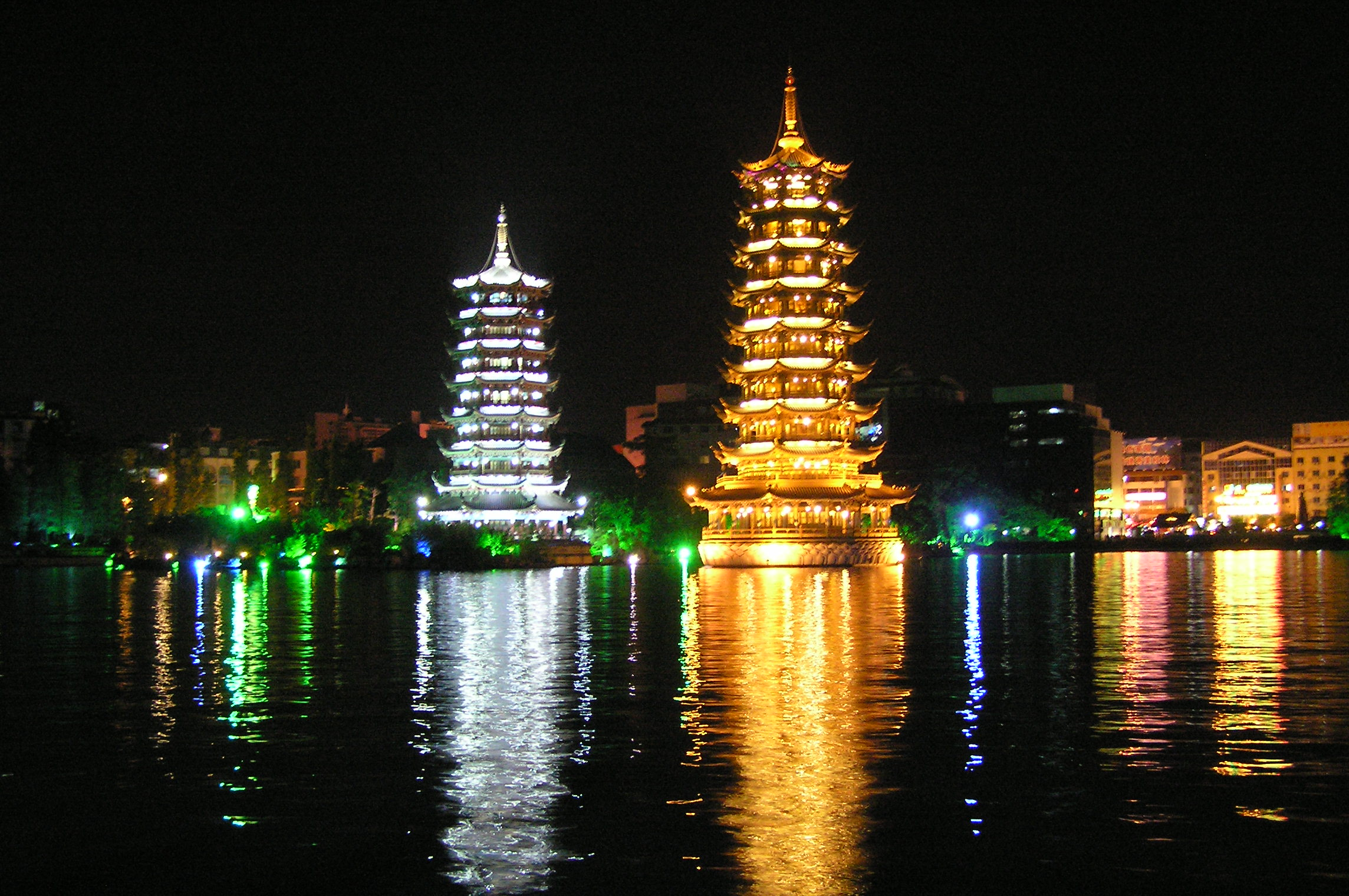
Night view of Shan Lake.

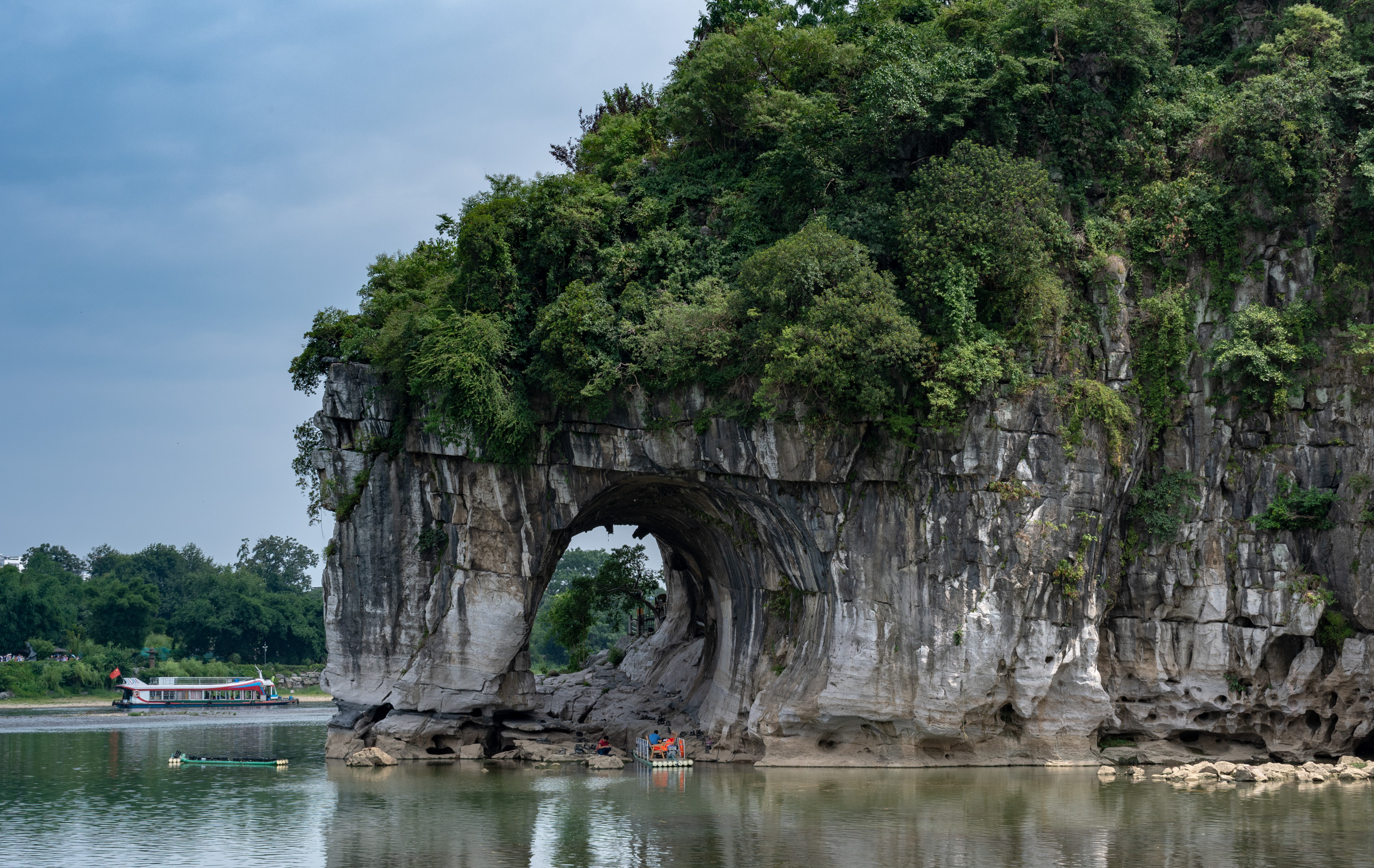
Elephant Trunk Hill in Guilin.

=== Yuzi Paradise ===
"Yuzi Paradise" Sculpture Park is a modern cultural attraction in Guilin. This art center was established by the Taiwanese businessman Cao Rizhang." Since 1997, the park has hosted eight international creative activities, with over 150 sculptures created by masters from more than 20 countries and regions worldwide. The ultimate goal of Yuzi Paradise is to "create a historical cave comparable to the Dunhuang Caves that reflects contemporary human life."

=== Legends ===
- The origin of Guilin Scenic Area: It is said that the landscape of Guilin was created by the goddess Chang'e.
- Returning the Pearl after Testing the Sword (试剑还珠): This story involves the old Dragon King in the Crystal Palace of the Fubo Pool next to Fubo Hill and his dragon pearl placed in Reed Flute Cave. The legend includes locations such as Wine Pot Hill, Nanxi Hill, Floating Goose Islet, and Returning Pearl Cave.
- Treasure in Reed Flute Cave (芦笛藏宝): It is said that Chang'e turned treasures into stalactites in Reed Flute Cave. This legend involves locations such as the Lion Sending Off Guests, Reed Flute Cave, etc.
- The Rebellion of the Divine Elephant (神象叛主): This story involves a dispute between the pheasant demon, the elephant, and Chang'e, and includes locations such as Seven-star Cave, Elephant Hill, the pagoda on Elephant Hill, and Zhi Hill (雉山).
- Amah Rock (husband-watching stone, 望夫石): A story about a kind-hearted couple, involving locations such as Yellow Ox Gorge, Doumi Shoal, Immortal Stone, and Amah Rock.
- Colorful Brocade Turned to Stone (彩锦化石): A legend involving Chang'e helping the people to defeat monsters, with locations such as Diecai Hill, Wind Cave, Mulong Cave, White Crane Cave, Frog Stone, and Mulong Tower.
- The Past and Present of West Hill (西山今昔): A legend involving Guanyin, three fairies, and Chang'e defeating monsters, including locations such as the Six Caves of Hidden Hill, the Old Horse Herdsman, and Guanyin Peak.
- Chang'e Repaints the Nine Horses (嫦娥五易九马图): : A legend about Chang'e painting the "Nine Horses Painting," involving locations such as Thunderstruck Mountain, Monkey Holding a Watermelon, and Nine Peaks Mountain.
- The Snail Girl Escapes Marriage (螺女逃婚): A legend about the Snail Girl escaping marriage, involving locations such as Beauty Dressing, Snail Hill, and Beauty Peak.

== History ==
In 1982, the State Council announced Guilin as one of the first batch of National Historical and Cultural Cities.

== Influence ==
Guilin's landscape is one of China's top ten scenic spots. The scientific significance of Guilin's landscape is from the concentration of the Guilin-Yangshuo type of peak forest karst landforms. These formations are internationally recognized by the karst community as the world's typical representative of peak forest karst landforms and a model of tropical and subtropical peak forest landforms.

=== Poetry ===
- Han Yu wrote the verse "The river forms a green silk belt, and the mountains resemble jade hairpins". (Note: In Chinese: “江作青罗带，山如碧玉簪”.)
- He Jingzhi composed the "Song of Guilin Scenic Area" (Note: In Chinese:《桂林山水歌》) during his visit to Guilin.
- Over 800 years ago, during the Southern Song dynasty, Wang Zhenggong wrote the famous line "Guilin's landscape is the best under heaven (Note: In Chinese:“桂林山水甲天下”.) in his poem "A Grand Banquet Encouraging the Emperor", (Note: In Chinese:《大比宴享即席劝驾诗》.) which made Guilin's scenery renowned worldwide.
- In 1963, Chen Yi accompanied Prince Sihanouk of Cambodia on a tour of Guilin and left behind the famous verse, "I would rather be a Guilin native than a god". (Note: In Chinese: “愿做桂林人，不愿做神仙”.)
- In 1985, then-U.S. Vice President George H. W. Bush and his wife toured the Li River; in 1987, Jimmy Carter and his wife visited Guilin's landscape; in July 1998, the Clinton family toured the Li River and gave a speech on environmental protection in Seven-star Park.
- In 1985, Norwegian Prince Harald and Princess Sonja toured Yangshuo.

=== Famous quotes ===
- "As far as I know, Guilin's scenery is unique in the world." — (USA) Tsung-Dao Lee, June 1974. (Note: In Chinese: 据我所知，桂林的风景在世界上是独一无二的.)
- "The beautiful scenery before my eyes must have been created by a 'God' or a 'superhuman.'" — (Zambia) Frederick Chiluba, October 2000.
- "I would rather be a Guilin native than a god." — Poet Marshal Chen Yi.
