= Fuli =

Fuli could refer to the following locations:

== China ==
- Fuli (腹裏) or Central Region within the Yuan dynasty directly governed by the Zhongshu Sheng
- Fuli Subdistrict (富力街道), a subdistrict in Nanshan District, Hegang, Heilongjiang
- Fuli, Fuchuan County (福利镇), a town in Fuchuan Yao Autonomous County, Hezhou, Guangxi
- Fuli, Jixian County (福利镇), a town in Jixian County, Shuangyashan, Heilongjiang
- Fuli, Liling (富里镇), a town in Liling, Zhuzhou, Hunan
- Fuli, Yongqiao District (符离镇), a town in Yongqiao District, Suzhou, Anhui
- Fuli, Yangshuo County (福利镇), a town in Yangshuo County, Guilin, Guangxi

== Taiwan ==
- Fuli, Hualien (富里鄉）, a rural township located in southern Hualien County

== Film ==
- Fuli (character), a character in The Lion King (franchise).
