= Silver Cave =

Cave in Guilin, China

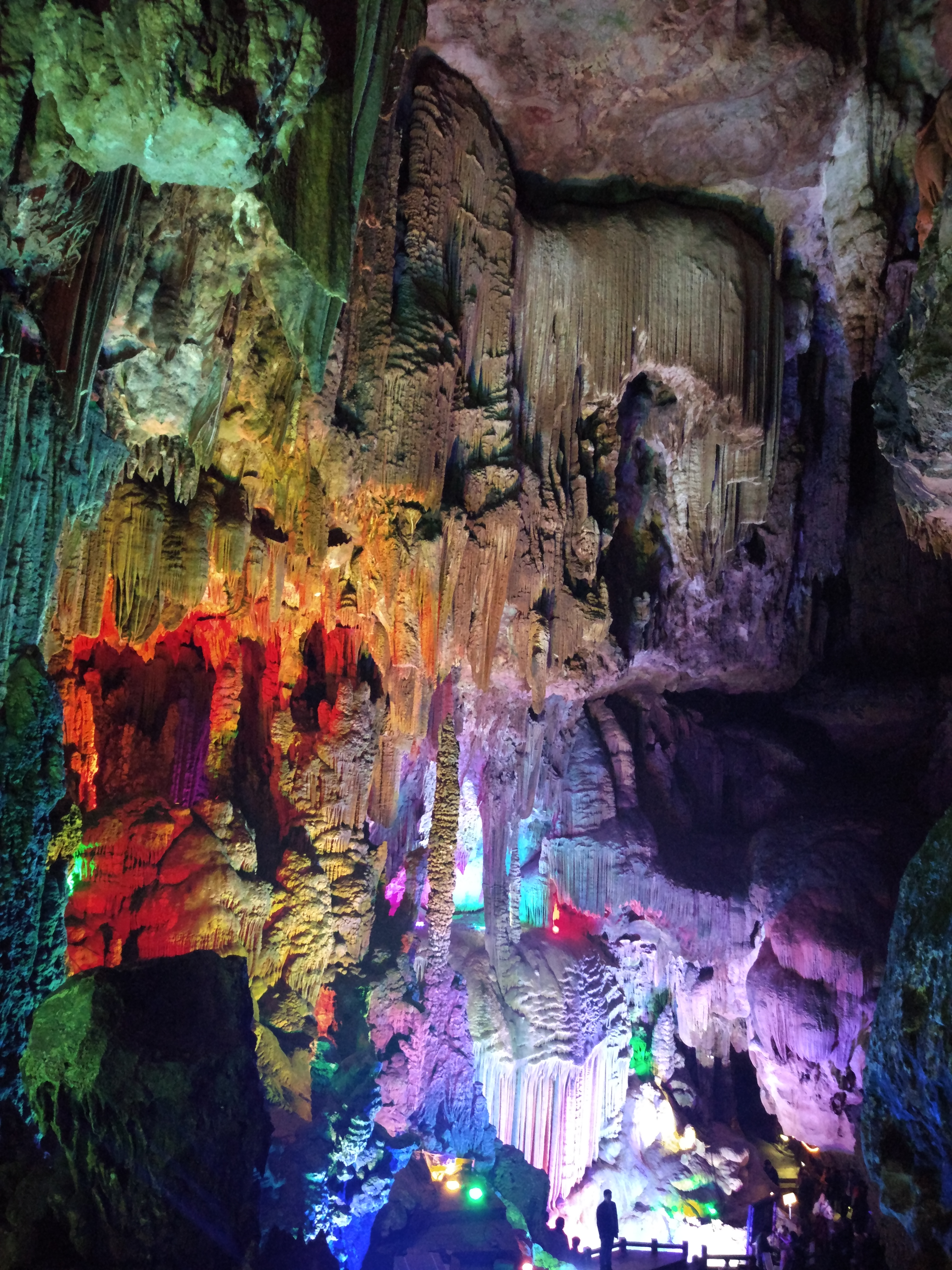
View into the colorful illuminated cave

Silver Cave (Chinese: 银子岩; pinyin: yín zi yán) is a national AAAA level scenic spot in Lipu County, Guilin City, Guangxi Province of China, 85 km from Guilin and 18 km away from Yangshuo.

Silver Cave lies in typical karst landscape, running through 12 hills. The cave is a floor-type cave, with three layers and more than ten scenic spots and different types of stalactites, which are crystal clear and sparkling like silver, giving the cave its name. The most three famous scenic areas are "Snow-Mountain With Waterfall" (Chinese: 雪山飞瀑; pinyin: xuěshān fēi pù), "Music Stone Screen" (Chinese: 音乐石屏; pinyin: yīnyuè shí píng), and "Jade Pool Wonderland" (Chinese: 瑶池仙境; pinyin: yáochí xiānjìng). In early 1999 it was listed as a "Guilin tourism scenic spot of civilization demonstration".

There is a Chinese proverb: "Anyone who has been to Silver Cave will never be short of money".
