= Yulong River =

Coordinates: 24.7725°N 110.5070°E

Yulong
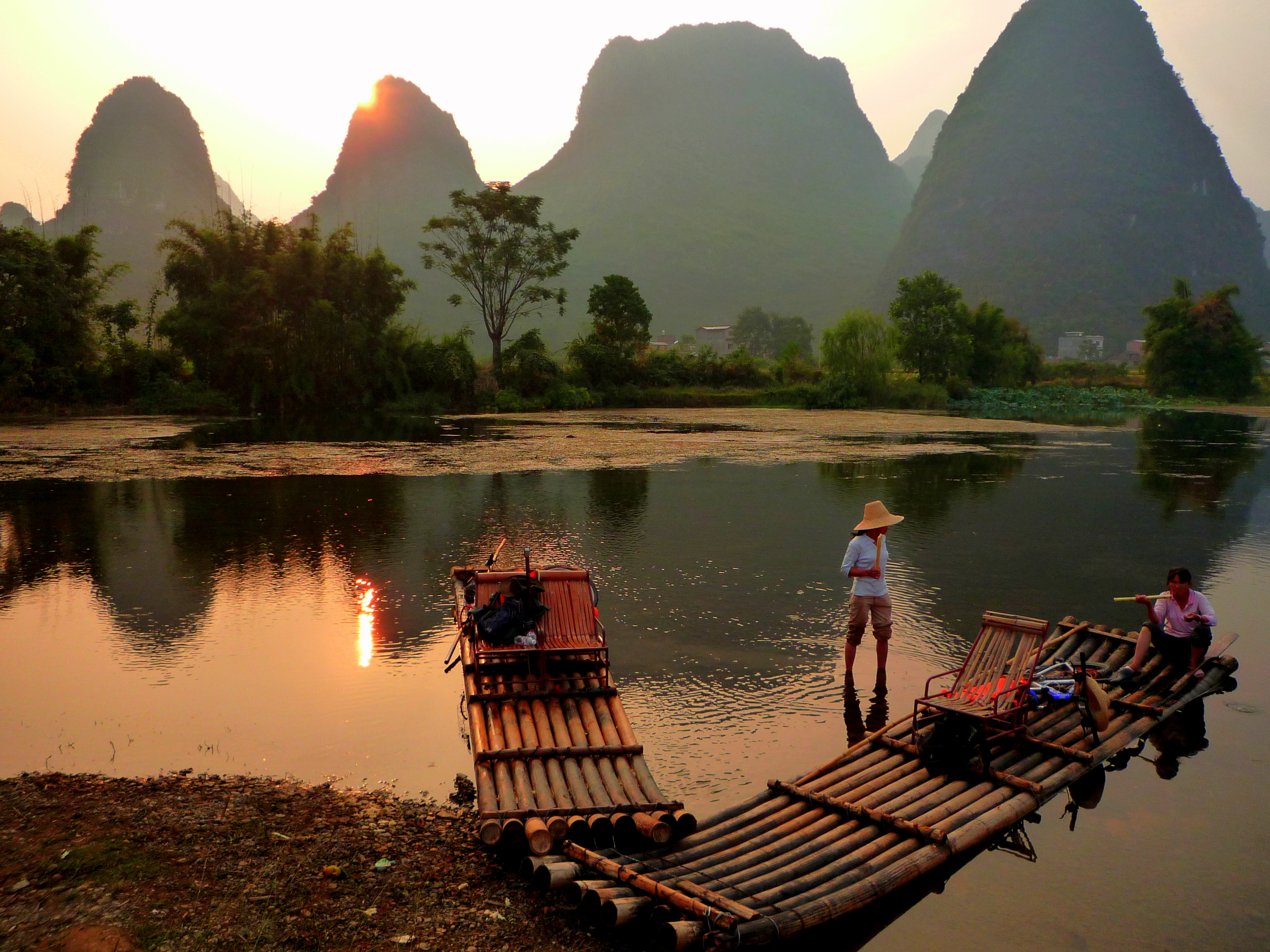
- Bamboo rafts on the Yulong River

Location
- Country: China

Physical characteristics
- Source
  - location: Lijiang River
- Length: 35 km (22 mi)

The Yulong River (Chinese: 遇龙河; pinyin: Yùlóng Hé) is a small tributary of the larger Li River in Southeastern Guangxi Zhuang Autonomous Region that runs through the major city of Guilin to Yangshuo. The Yulong starts in Northern Yangshuo County near Litang and runs for over 35 kilometres (22 mi) through small villages of the Yulong River Valley, including Litang, Chaolong, Yima and Gaotian town, before emptying into the Li around the town of Ping Le. The Yulong is a shallow river of around 5 meters (16 ft) maximum depth and an average of 25 meters (82 ft) across. As it is not located near any industrial areas, it is clean enough for swimming, though some brownish surface foam is visible in eddys, probably the result of phosphate runoff from local villages.

Unlike the busy Li River, it has no motorized boat traffic and relies completely on bamboo rafts to ferry passengers downriver. This has become a popular tourist activity, with passengers beginning their journey at the Yulong Bridge, a 400-year-old stone bridge. As the local government has improved local roads through the Yulong River Valley, biking has also become a popular tourist activity, as there are many quaint villages along the river, some offering bed and breakfast accommodation.

The Yulong is prone to sudden flooding, which is one of the reasons why there are not more places to stay close by. Local people have built breakwaters (weirs) every kilometer or so to allow their animals to cross the river, though many have fallen into disrepair. During the dry season (November–March), it is possible for people to walk across some of these weirs; otherwise it is necessary to hire local people to ferry passengers across for about RMB 10 per person.

The Yulong River Valley is very fertile, and its low-lying terrain is excellent for rice fields. In recent years, farmers have planted more cash crops such as pomelos, tangerines and mandarin oranges, which bring in more income than rice. The valley is still agricultural, with few services or businesses outside of the small villages. The valley is accessible from the main Yangshuo highway through the village of Yi Ma, north at the Yulong Bridge and south at the Gong Nong Bridge. The river is approximately 7 kilometres (4.3 mi) south of Yangshuo town proper.

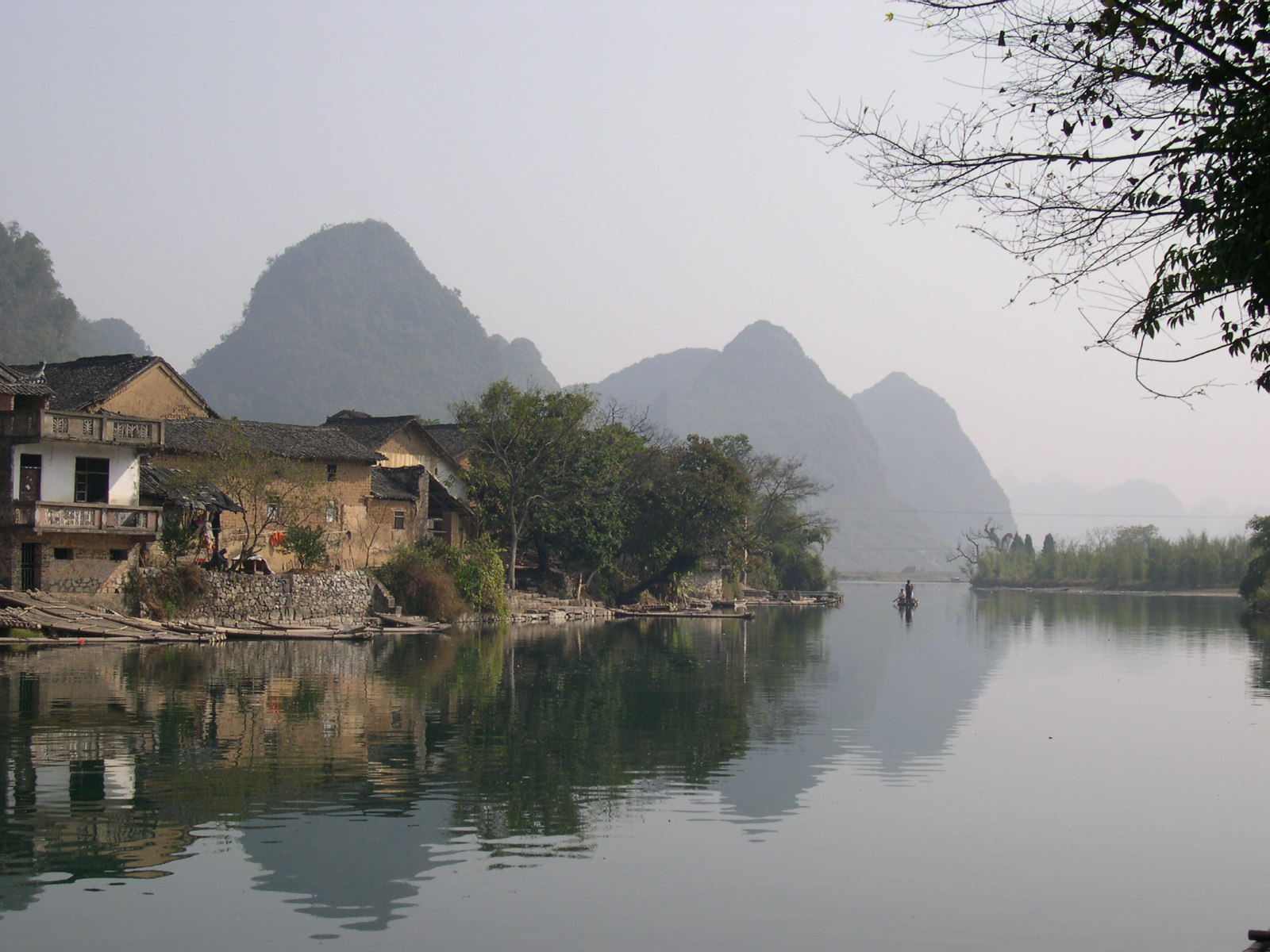
Yulong near Baisha

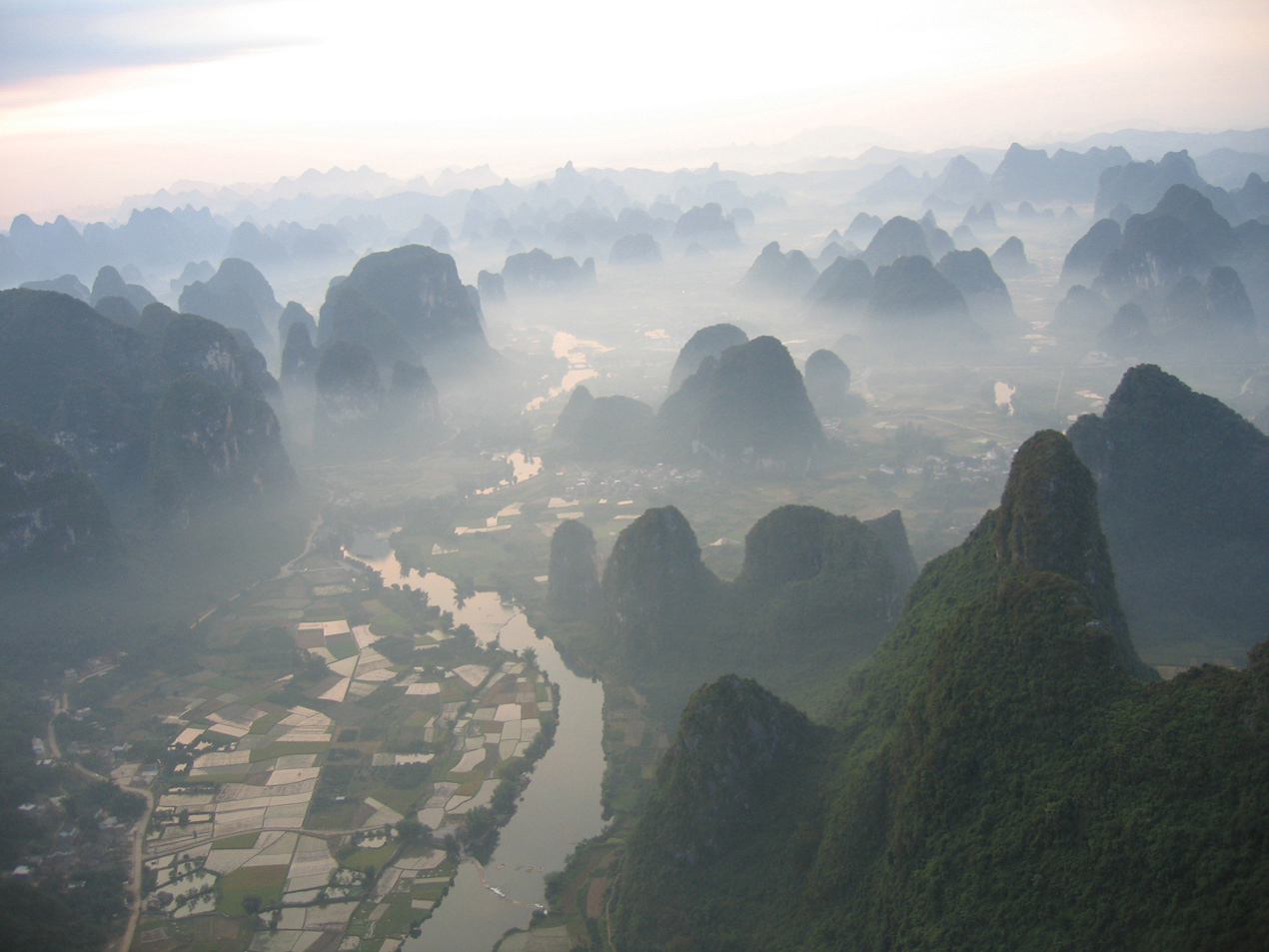
Yulong River Valley (from a hot air balloon).
