= Elephant Trunk Hill =

Landmark and tourist attraction in Guilin, Guangxi, China

Coordinates: 25°16′13.63″N 110°17′31.77″E

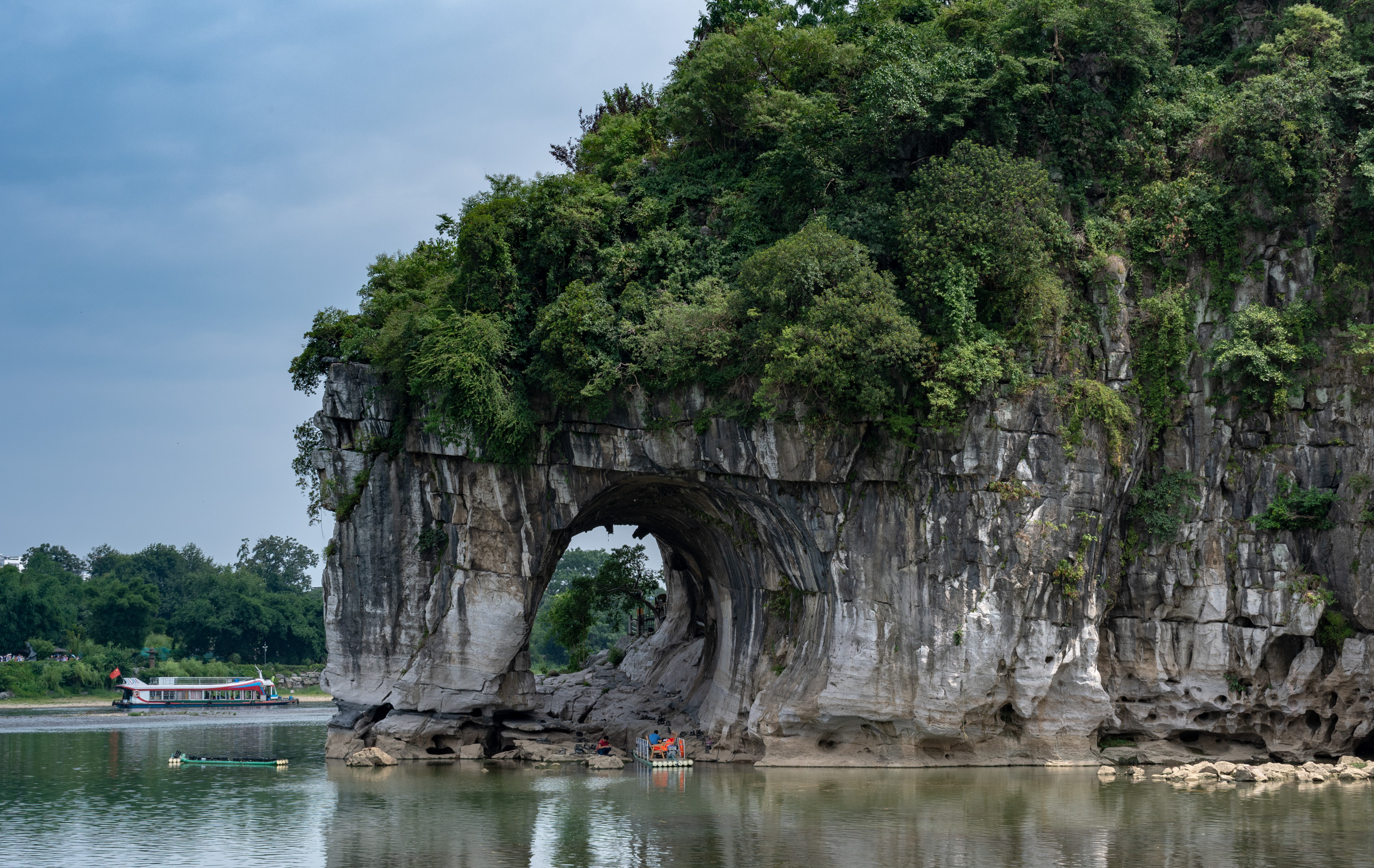
Elephant Trunk Hill

The Elephant Trunk Hill (Chinese: 象鼻山; pinyin: Xiàngbí Shān) is a hill, landmark and tourist attraction in Guilin, Guangxi, China.

== Name ==
Elephant Trunk Hill is the symbol of the city of Guilin. It got its name because it looks like an elephant drinking water. The round opening that would be under the elephant’s trunk is known as Water-Moon Cave because at night the reflection of the moon can be seen through the arch and it looks as if it is under the water and floating on the surface of the water at the same time. Elephant Trunk Hill and Water-Moon Cave are located at the confluence of the Taohua River and the Lijiang River.

== See also ==
- Moon Hill, in Yangshuo County
- Torghatten, in Norway
