= Puyi Township, Guangxi =

Puyi Township 普益乡
- Township
- Location in Guangxi
- Coordinates: 24°40′28″N 110°35′53″E
- Country: People's Republic of China
- Autonomous region: Guangxi
- Prefecture-level city: Guilin
- County: Yangshuo County
- Time zone: UTC+8 (China Standard)

Puyi Township (simplified Chinese: 普益乡; traditional Chinese: 普益鄉; pinyin: Pǔyì Xiāng) is a township under the administration of Yangshuo County, Guangxi, China. As of 2020, it administers Puyi Street Residential Neighborhood and the following eight villages:

- Puyi Village
- Shangguan Village (上观村)
- Muqiao Village (木桥村)
- Liugong Village (留公村)
- Yong Village (勇村)
- Gule Village (古乐村)
- Shangyou Village (上游村)
- Dashan Village (大山村)
