= National Famous Historical and Cultural City =

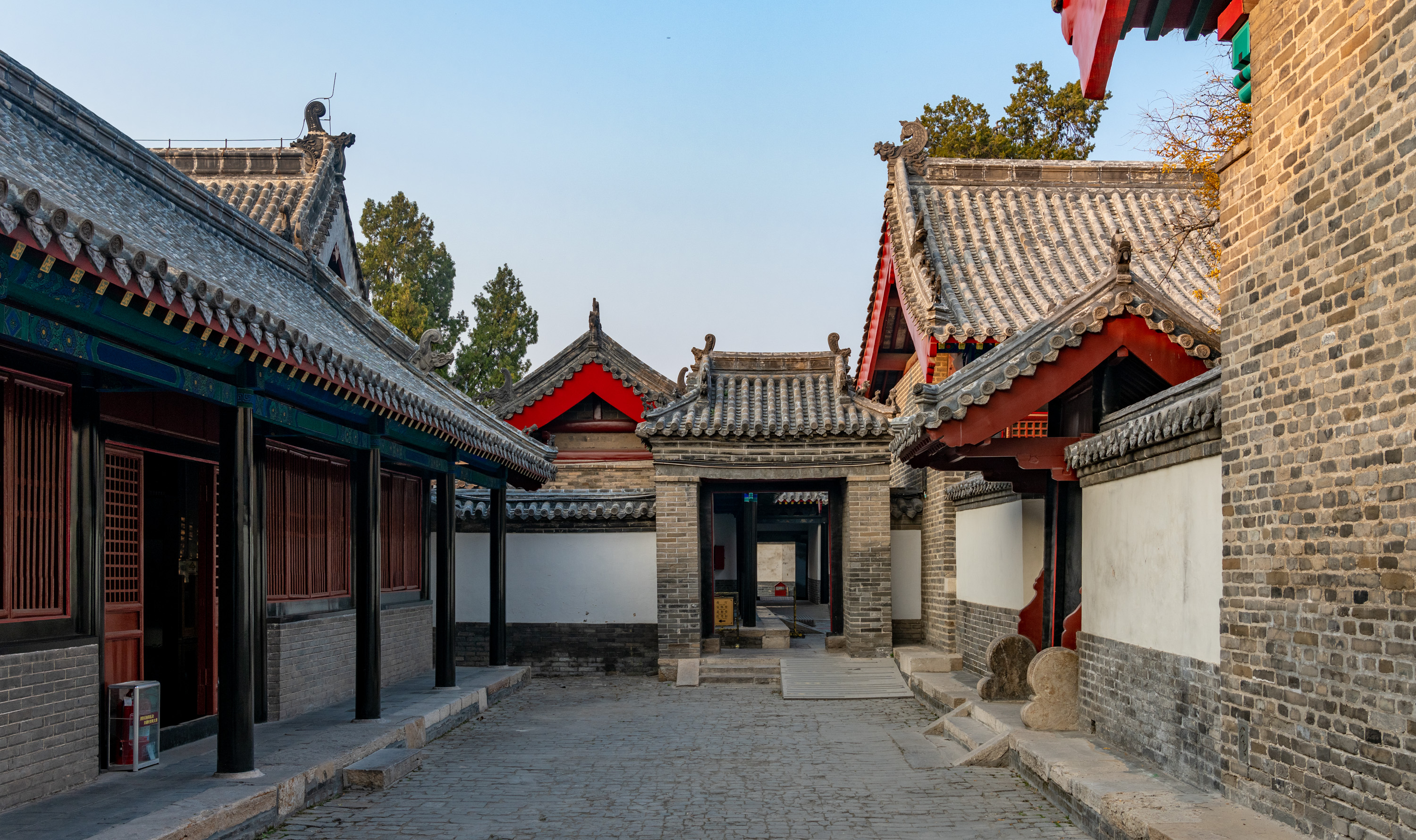
Being the birthplace of Confucius and Confucianism, Qufu, Shandong was elected as the first batch of National Famous Historical and Cultural City

This is a list of cities designated as National Famous Historical and Cultural Cities (国家历史文化名城) by the State Council of China. China approved 99 National Famous Historical and Cultural Cities in three batches in 1982, 1986 and 1994, and has approved a further 45 cities from August 10, 2001 to December 12, 2024, bringing the total to 144. These cities are distributed throughout every provinces, autonomous region, and municipality except for Hong Kong and Macao. Jiangsu is the province with the most National Famous Historical and Cultural Cities, having 14; Shandong and Zhejiang are second, each having 10, Guangdong, Henan, Sichuan, and Yunnan are 4th with 8 cities, and Anhui is 8th, having 7. and Hebei, Jiangxi, Shanxi, Shaanxi are 9th, each with 6 National Famous Historical and Cultural Cities.

== Concept ==
According to the Protection Law on Cultural Relics of China, a National Famous Historical and Cultural City is a city with an unusual wealth of cultural relics of high historical value and major revolutionary significance, subject to the approval and announcement of the State Council of PR China. The local government at the county level of the place where the famous city is located must organize the formulation of plans on protection of the famous city and bring that planning into the overall city planning. Measures for the protection of famous city shall be formulated by the State Council.

== First batch ==
The first batch was published on February 8, 1982 by State Council, there are 24 Chinese cities.

24 cities

- Beijing (北京)
- Changsha (长沙) in Hunan
- Chengde (承德) in Hebei
- Chengdu (成都) in Sichuan
- Dali (大理) in Yunnan
- Datong (大同) in Shanxi
- Guangzhou (广州) in Guangdong
- Guilin (桂林) in Guangxi
- Hangzhou (杭州) in Zhejiang
- Jingdezhen (景德镇) in Jiangxi
- Jingzhou (荆州) in Hubei
- Kaifeng (开封) in Henan
- Kunming (昆明) in Yunnan
- Lhasa (拉萨) in Tibet
- Luoyang (洛阳) in Henan
- Nanjing (南京) in Jiangsu
- Quanzhou (泉州) in Fujian
- Qufu (曲阜) in Shandong
- Shaoxing (绍兴) in Zhejiang
- Suzhou (苏州) in Jiangsu
- Xi'an (西安) in Shaanxi
- Yan'an (延安) in Shaanxi
- Yangzhou (扬州) in Jiangsu
- Zunyi (遵义) in Guizhou
Location of cities in the first batch

== Second batch ==
The second batch was published on December 8, 1986 by State Council, there are 38 cities.

38 cities

- Anyang (安阳) in Henan
- Baoding (保定) in Hebei
- Bozhou (亳州) in Anhui
- Changshu (常熟) in Jiangsu
- Chaozhou (潮州) in Guangdong
- Chongqing (重庆)
- Dunhuang (敦煌) in Gansu
- Fuzhou (福州) in Fujian
- Hancheng (韩城) in Shaanxi
- Hohhot (呼和浩特) in Inner Mongolia
- Huai'an (淮安) in Jiangsu
- Jinan (济南) in Shandong
- Kashgar (喀什) in Xinjiang
- Langzhong (阆中) in Sichuan
- Lijiang (丽江) in Yunnan
- Nanchang (南昌) in Jiangxi
- Nanyang (南阳) in Henan
- Ningbo (宁波) in Zhejiang
- Pingyao (平遥) in Shanxi
- Shanghai (上海)
- Shangqiu (商丘县) in Henan
- She County (歙县) in Anhui
- Shenyang (沈阳) in Liaoning
- Shigatse (日喀则) in Tibet
- Shou County (寿县) in Anhui
- Tianjin (天津)
- Wuhan (武汉) in Hubei
- Wuwei (武威) in Gansu
- Xiangfan (襄樊) in Hubei
- Xuzhou (徐州) in Jiangsu
- Yibin (宜宾) in Sichuan
- Yinchuan (银川) in Ningxia
- Yulin (榆林) in Shaanxi
- Zhangye (张掖) in Gansu
- Zhangzhou (漳州) in Fujian
- Zhenjiang (镇江) in Jiangsu
- Zhenyuan (镇远) in Guizhou
- Zigong (自贡) in Sichuan
Location of cities in the second batch

== Third batch ==
The third batch was published on January 4, 1994 by State Council, there are 37 cities.

37 cities

- Changting County (长汀) in Fujian
- Dai County (代县) in Shanxi
- Dujiangyan (都江堰) in Sichuan
- Foshan (佛山) in Guangdong
- Ganzhou (赣州) in Jiangxi
- Gyantse County (江孜) in Tibet
- Handan (邯郸) in Hebei
- Hanzhong (汉中) in Shaanxi
- Harbin (哈尔滨) in Heilongjiang
- Ji'an (集安) in Jilin
- Jianshui County (建水) in Yunnan
- Jilin City (吉林) in Jilin
- Leizhou (雷州) in Guangdong
- Leshan (乐山) in Sichuan
- Liaocheng (聊城) in Shandong
- Linhai (临海) in Zhejiang
- Liuzhou (柳州) in Guangxi
- Luzhou (泸州) in Sichuan
- Meizhou (梅州) in Guangdong
- Qi County (祁县) in Shanxi
- Qingdao (青岛) in Shandong
- Qiongshan District (琼山) in Haikou, Hainan
- Quzhou (衢州) in Zhejiang
- Suizhou (随州) in Hubei
- Tianshui (天水) in Gansu
- Tongren (同仁) in Qinghai
- Weishan County (巍山) in Yunnan
- Xianyang (咸阳) in Shaanxi
- Xinjiang County (新绛) in Shanxi
- Xun County (浚县) in Henan
- Yueyang (岳阳) in Hunan
- Zhaoqing (肇庆) in Guangdong
- Zhengding (正定) in Hebei
- Zhengzhou (郑州) in Henan
- Zhongxiang (钟祥) in Hubei
- Zibo (淄博) in Shandong
- Zoucheng (邹城) in Shandong
Location of cities in the third batch

== Supplementary list ==
45 cities

Supplementary List for 2001–present
Number	Name	Chinese	Province	Approval date
1	Shanhaiguan, Qinhuangdao	秦皇岛山海关	Hebei	10-Aug-01
2	Fenghuang	凤凰	Hunan	17-Dec-01
3	Puyang	濮阳	Henan	1-Oct-01
4	Anqing	安庆	Anhui	14-Apr-05
5	Tai'an	泰安	Shandong	9-Mar-07
6	Haikou	海口	Hainan	13-Mar-07
7	Jinhua	金华	Zhejiang	18-Mar-07
8	Jixi	绩溪	Anhui	18-Mar-07
9	Turpan	吐鲁番	Xinjiang	27-Apr-07
10	Tekes	特克斯	Xinjiang	6-May-07
11	Wuxi	无锡	Jiangsu	15-Sep-07
12	Nantong	南通	Jiangsu	2-Jan-09
13	Beihai	北海	Guangxi	9-Nov-10
14	Jiaxing	嘉兴	Zhejiang	27-Jan-11
15	Yixing	宜兴	Jiangsu	27-Jan-11
16	Zhongshan	中山	Guangdong	17-Mar-11
17	Taiyuan	太原	Shanxi	17-Mar-11
18	Penglai	蓬莱	Shandong	1-May-11
19	Huili	会理	Sichuan	8-Nov-11
20	Kuqa	库车	Xinjiang	15-Mar-12
21	Yining	伊宁	Xinjiang	28-Jun-12
22	Taizhou	泰州	Jiangsu	10-Feb-13
23	Huize	会泽	Yunnan	18-May-13
24	Yantai	烟台	Shandong	18-Nov-13
25	Qingzhou	青州	Shandong	18-Nov-13
26	Huzhou	湖州	Zhejiang	14-Jul-14
27	Qiqihar	齐齐哈尔	Heilongjiang	6-Aug-14
28	Changzhou	常州	Jiangsu	1-Aug-15
29	Ruijin	瑞金	Jiangxi	11-Aug-15
30	Huizhou	惠州	Guangdong	3-Oct-15
31	Wenzhou	温州	Zhejiang	22-Apr-16
32	Gaoyou	高邮	Jiangsu	28-Nov-16
33	Yongzhou	永州	Hunan	16-December-16
34	Longquan	龙泉	Zhejiang	16-July-17
35	Changchun	长春	Jilin	15-October-17
36	Yu County	蔚县	Hebei	2-May-18
37	Liaoyang	辽阳	Liaoning	29-November-20
38	Tonghai County	通海	Yunnan	3-March-21
39	Yi County	黟县	Anhui	2-June-21
40	Tongcheng	桐城	Anhui	7-November-21
41	Fuzhou	抚州	Jiangxi	11-January-22
42	Jiujiang	九江	Jiangxi	38-March-22
43	Jianchuan County	劍川	Yunnan	5-March-23
44	Putian	莆田	Fujian	30-September-23
45	Xinghua	興化	Jiangsu	12-December-24
46	Zhijiang	芷江	Hunan	26-January-26

== See also ==
- Guilin Scenic Area
