= Putao, Guangxi =

Putao 葡萄镇
- Town
- Location in Guangxi
- Coordinates: 24°54′52″N 110°22′17″E
- Country: People's Republic of China
- Autonomous Region: Guangxi
- Prefecture-level city: Guilin
- County: Yangshuo County
- Time zone: UTC+8 (China Standard)

Putao (Chinese: 葡萄; pinyin: pútáo) is a town of Yangshuo County, Guangxi, China. As of 2020, it administers Putao Residential Neighborhood and the following 11 villages:

- Putao Village
- Fuwang Village (福旺村)
- Xiling Village (西岭村)
- Zhouzhai Village (周寨村)
- Yangmeiling Village (杨梅岭村)
- Xiayan Village (下岩村)
- Dongcun Village (洞村村)
- Bao'an Village (报安村)
- Lingpi Village (陵陂村)
- Malan Village (马岚村)
- Renhe Village (仁和村)
