= Moon Hill =

Hill and tourist attraction in China

Coordinates: 24°43′42″N 110°28′2″E

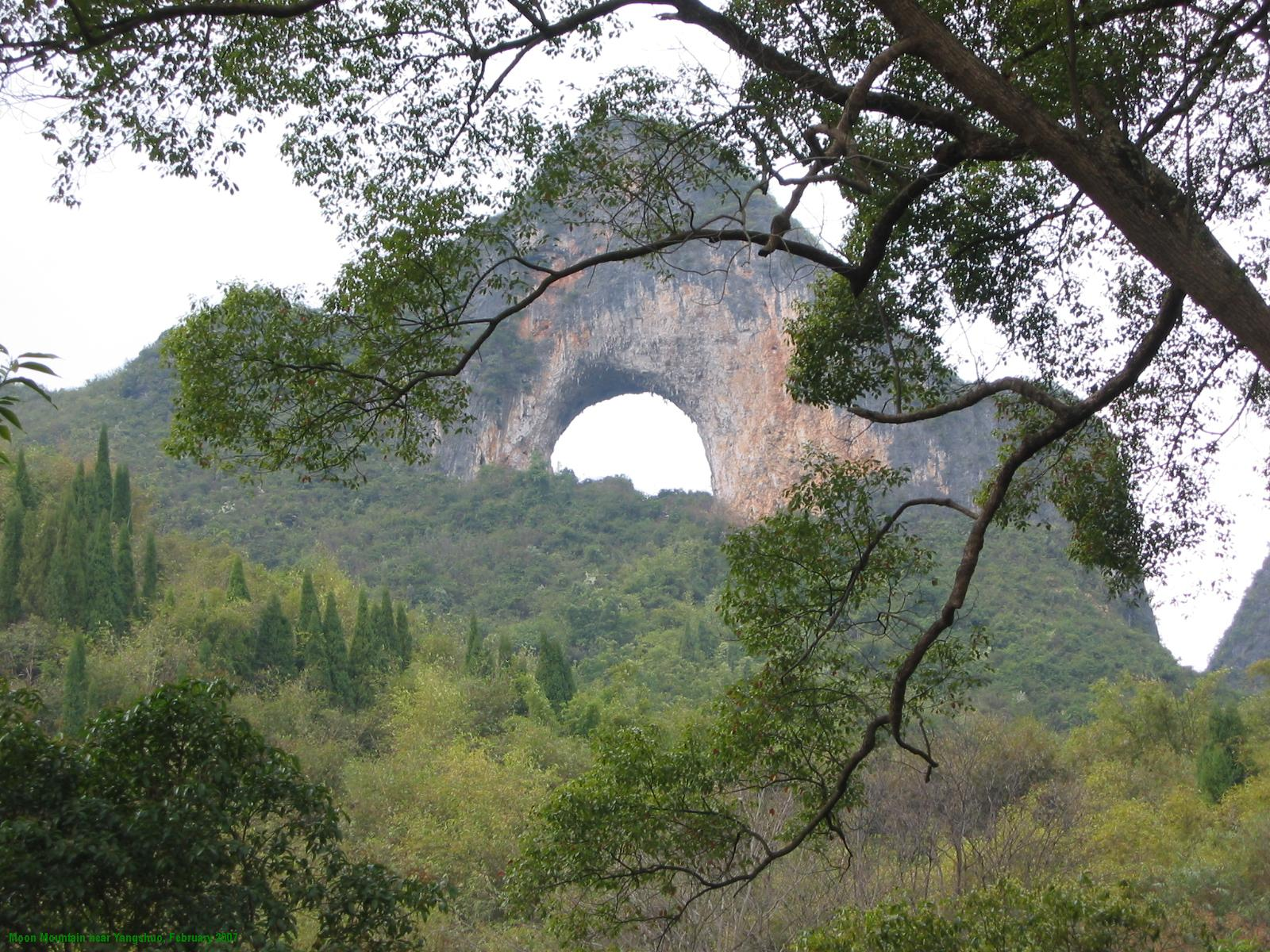
Moon Hill from below

Moon Hill (Chinese: 月亮山; pinyin: Yuèliàng Shān; lit. 'Moonlight Mountain') is a hill with a natural arch through it a few kilometers outside Yangshuo in southern China's Guangxi autonomous region. Moon Hill is part of the Guilin Mountains. It is so named for a wide, semicircular hole through the hill, all that remains of what was once a limestone cave formed in the phreatic zone. Like most formations in the region, it is karst. It is also a popular tourist attraction.

== Description ==
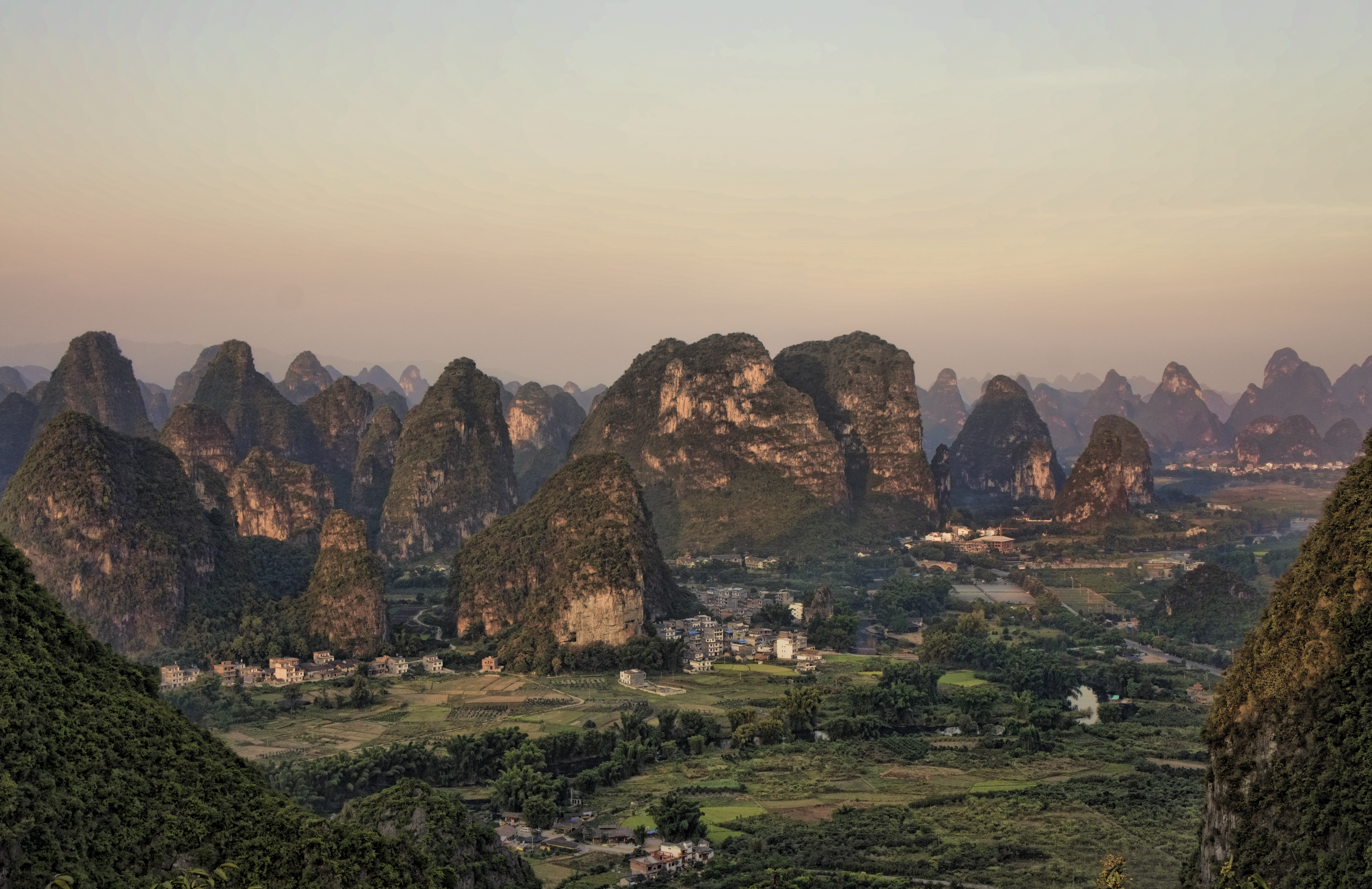
A view from the top

It takes roughly 20 minutes to climb up to the arch (about 1000 steps), or considerably longer for those who wish to reach the summit. Visitors must pay an entrance fee in order to climb the hill. Souvenir and refreshment vendors often follow climbers up and down the path.

In addition to a concrete tourist path which passes through the arch, and a somewhat rougher, steeper path leading to the summit above the arch, Moon Hill has several rock climbing routes, many of which were pioneered by the American climber Todd Skinner in the 1990s. It has also been used for abseils in several adventure races.

Moon Hill offers broad panoramic views of the surrounding countryside which is characterized by the knobby karst hills found throughout the region.

== Geography ==
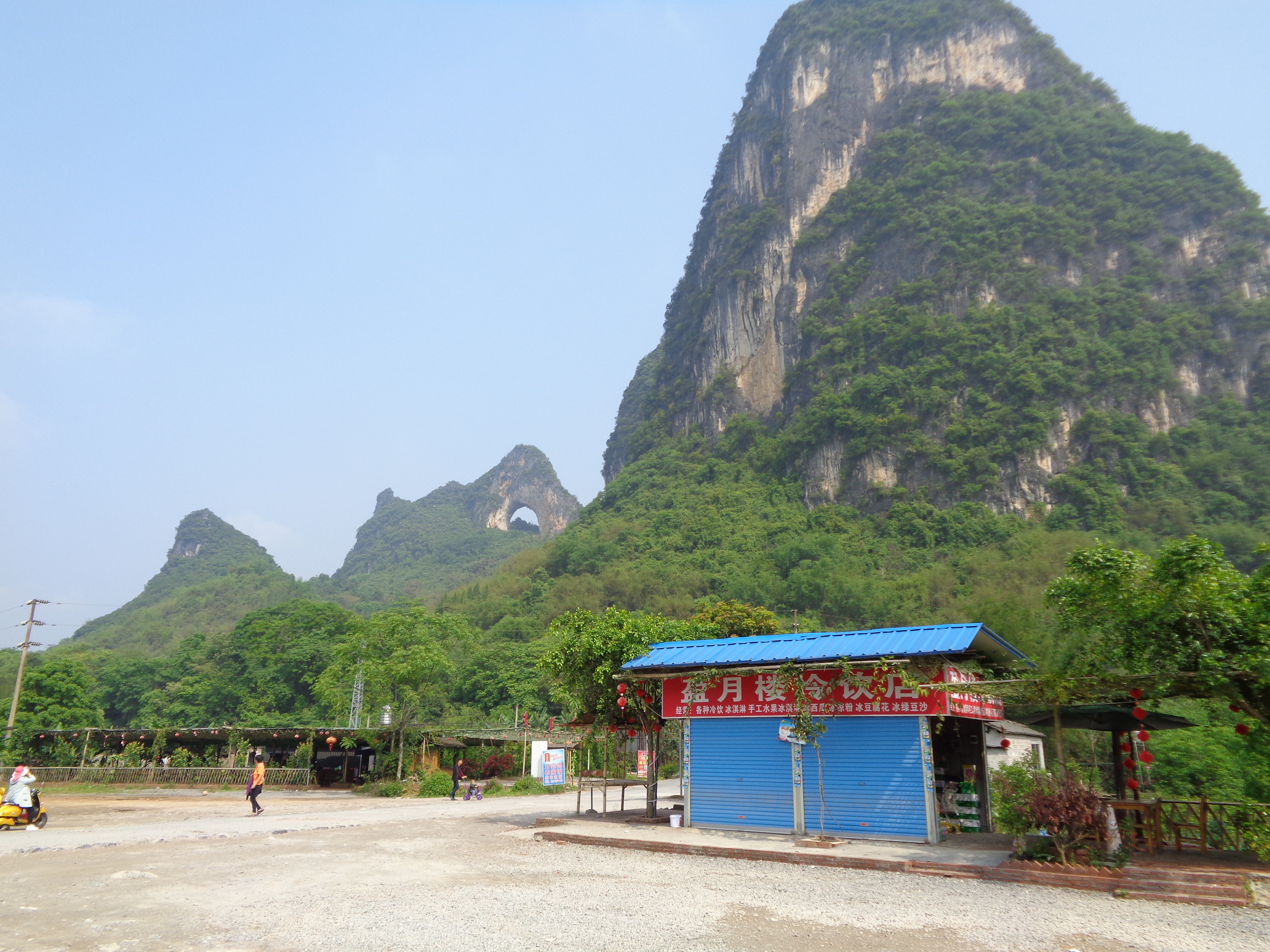
Moon Hill from nearby parking lot

Moon Hill is located to the south of Yangshuo across the Jingbao river along China National Highway 321. It has an elevation of 380 m (1,250 ft), while the hill is 230 m (750 ft) in relative height and 410 m (1,350 ft) in length. The arch is about 50 meters in height.

== Climbing ban ==
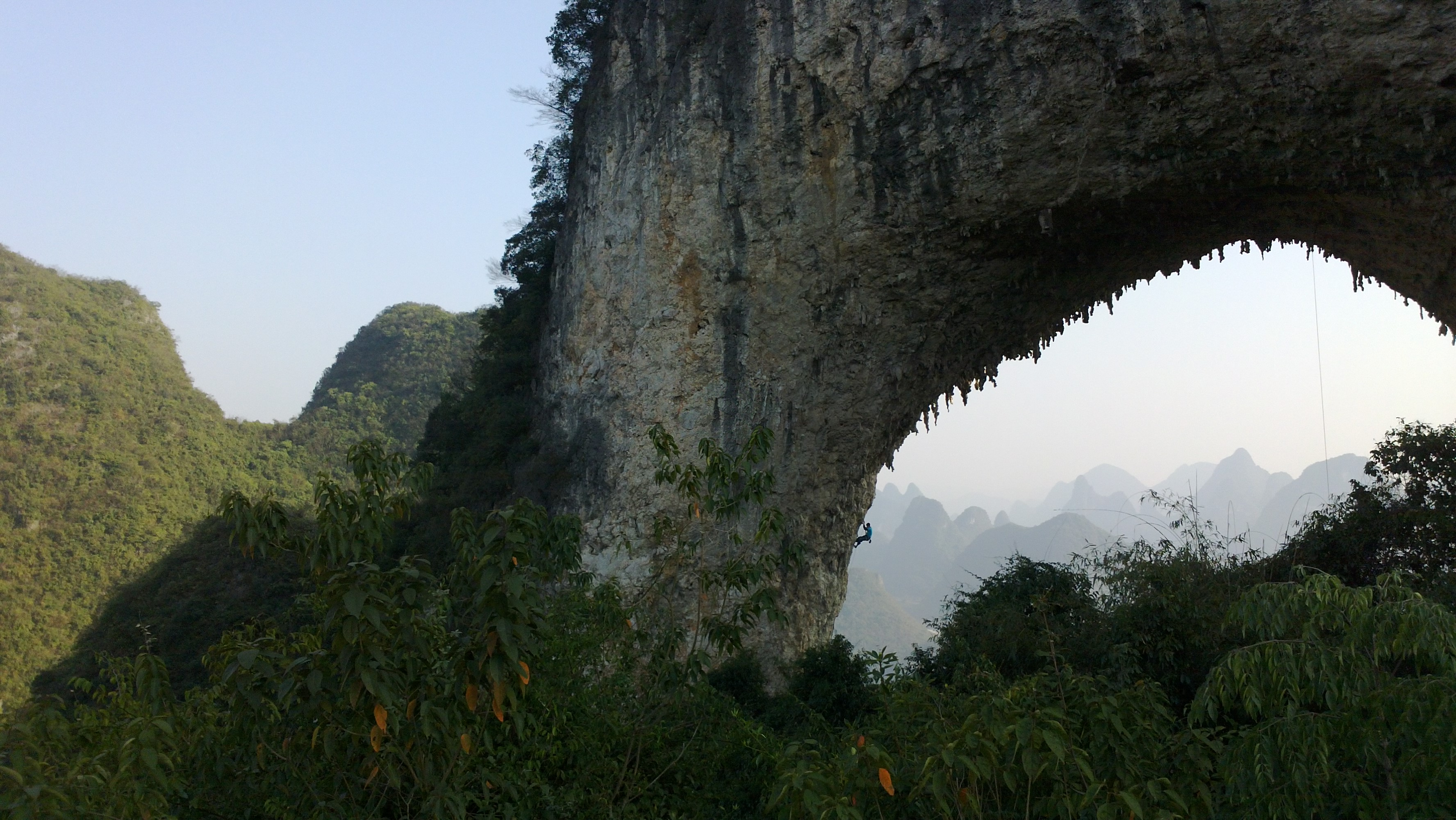
Rock climber on Moon Hill arch

Moon Hill had a two-year rock climbing ban lifted in 2019. The climbing ban, which went into effect in the first half of 2017, was in place due to a security guard on the viewing deck nearly being hit on the head with a piece of falling debris. During this time, climbing was only allowed during the annual Yangshuo climbing festival in late October. Moon Hill was leased by a new private company and, after meeting with the Yangshuo Climbers Association, they decided to remove the ban at the end of 2019. The ban was removed under the condition that the climbing routes be inspected annually, with the funding provided by the climbers' mandatory climbing insurance.

== See also ==
- Elephant Trunk Hill, in Guilin
- Torghatten, in Norway
