= Baisha, Yangshuo County =

Baisha 白沙镇
- Town
- Location in Guangxi
- Coordinates: 24°49′2″N 110°25′2″E
- Country: People's Republic of China
- Autonomous Region: Guangxi
- Prefecture-level city: Guilin
- County: Yangshuo County
- Time zone: UTC+8 (China Standard)

Baisha (Chinese: 白沙) is a town of Yangshuo County, Guangxi, China. As of 2018, it has one residential community and 15 villages under its administration.
