= Fengyu Cave =

Cave in Lipu, Guangxi, China

Coordinates: 24°28′5.49″N 110°21′34.12″E

Fengyu Cave (Chinese: 丰鱼岩) is a cave in Dongli Village, Sanhe Township, Lipu. It has an entire length of 5.3 kilometers and a subterranean river of 3.3 kilometers and runs through nine mountains. One hall is 25,500 square meters large. It is inhabited by red blind fish. The subterranean river is fed by the Sanhe River (三河), a tributary of the Lipu River, through karst fissures.
