= Lipu, Guangxi =

Lipu 荔浦市
- County-level city
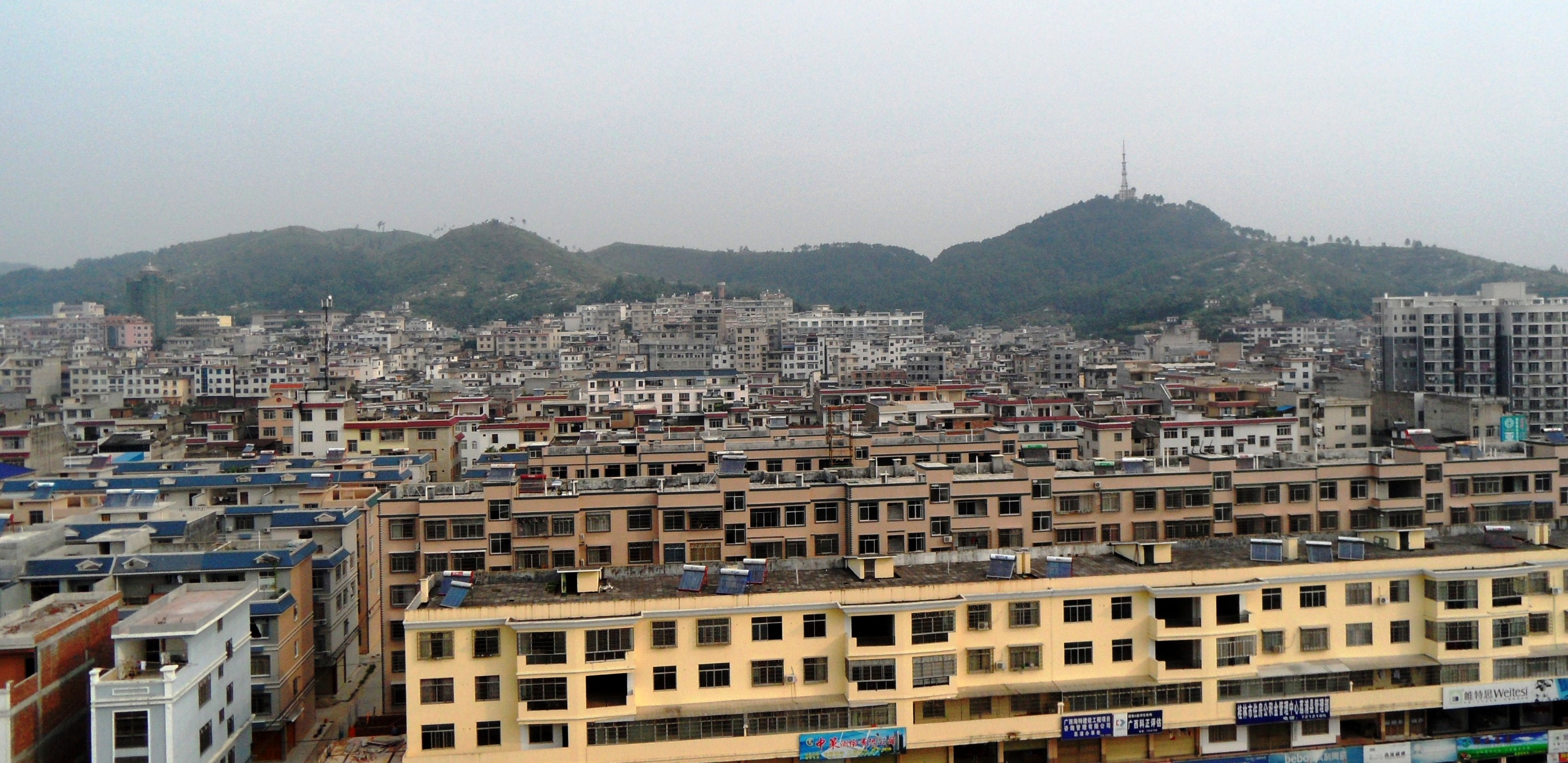

- Location of the seat in Guangxi
- Coordinates: 24°30′N 110°24′E
- Country: China
- Province: Guangxi
- Prefecture-level city: Guilin
- Municipal seat: Lipu Town

Area
  - Total: 1,759 km^{2} (679 sq mi)
- Time zone: UTC+8 (China Standard)

Lipu (Chinese: 荔浦; pinyin: Lìpǔ) is a county-level city in the northeast of Guangxi, China. It is under the administration of Guilin City, the downtown of which is 100 km (62 mi) to the north.

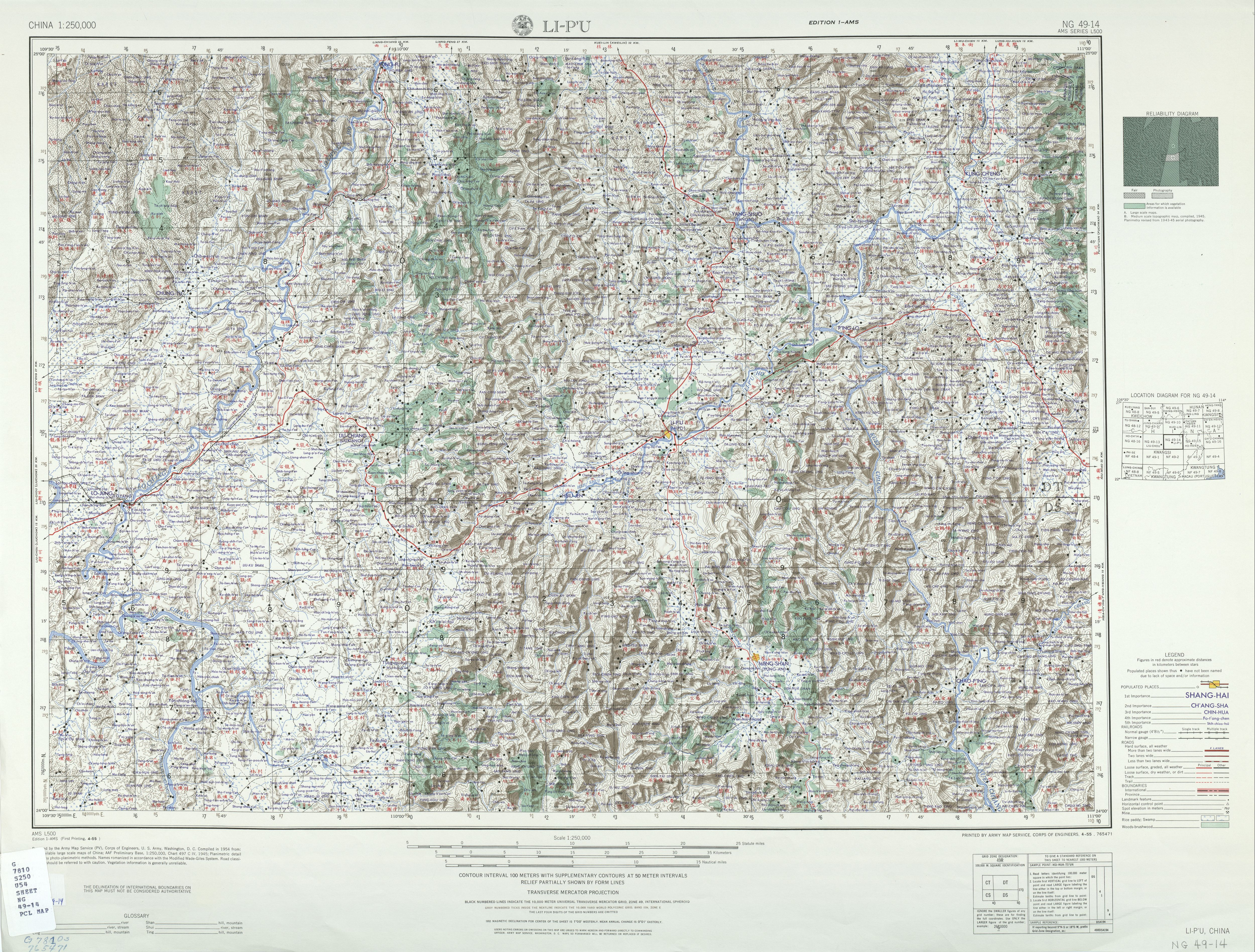
Map including Lipu (labeled as LI-P'U (LAIPO) 荔浦) (AMS, 1954)

Lipu has a population of 370,000 (2002). It covers an area of 1759 square kilometers. The seat of the city is at Lipu Town (荔浦镇).

Lipu is known as "China's hanger capital." The city is home to about 100 hanger companies, which have manufactured "billions" of clothes hangers that are used throughout the world, and distributed by companies such as Target and IKEA.

Other industries include a food processing plant which makes packaged snacks.

Fengyu Cave is found in Lipu.

== Administrative divisions ==
Lipu is divided into 10 towns, 2 townships and 1 ethnic township:

towns

- Licheng Town 荔城镇
- Dongchang Town 东昌镇
- Xinping Town 新坪镇
- Dumo Town 杜莫镇
- Qingshan Town 青山镇
- Xiuren Town 修仁镇
- Datang Town 大塘镇
- Huaqi Town 花𬕂镇
- Shuangjiang Town 双江镇
- Maling Town 马岭镇

townships

- Longhuai Township 龙怀乡
- Chacheng Township 茶城乡

ethnic township

- Pulu Yao Ethnic Township 蒲芦瑶族乡

== Climate ==
Climate data for Lipu, elevation 166 m (545 ft), (1991–2020 normals, extremes 1981–2010)
Month	Jan	Feb	Mar	Apr	May	Jun	Jul	Aug	Sep	Oct	Nov	Dec	Year
Record high °C (°F)	28.1 (82.6)	31.7 (89.1)	33.7 (92.7)	34.4 (93.9)	36.2 (97.2)	37.2 (99.0)	40.1 (104.2)	39.6 (103.3)	38.1 (100.6)	35.5 (95.9)	32.6 (90.7)	29.0 (84.2)	40.1 (104.2)
Mean daily maximum °C (°F)	13.4 (56.1)	15.9 (60.6)	19.0 (66.2)	24.9 (76.8)	29.0 (84.2)	31.2 (88.2)	33.2 (91.8)	33.4 (92.1)	31.3 (88.3)	27.3 (81.1)	22.0 (71.6)	16.3 (61.3)	24.7 (76.5)
Daily mean °C (°F)	9.4 (48.9)	11.8 (53.2)	15.0 (59.0)	20.5 (68.9)	24.4 (75.9)	26.9 (80.4)	28.3 (82.9)	28.0 (82.4)	25.9 (78.6)	21.8 (71.2)	16.6 (61.9)	11.3 (52.3)	20.0 (68.0)
Mean daily minimum °C (°F)	6.7 (44.1)	9.0 (48.2)	12.3 (54.1)	17.3 (63.1)	21.1 (70.0)	23.8 (74.8)	24.8 (76.6)	24.5 (76.1)	22.2 (72.0)	17.9 (64.2)	12.9 (55.2)	7.9 (46.2)	16.7 (62.1)
Record low °C (°F)	−2.2 (28.0)	−0.5 (31.1)	1.2 (34.2)	5.8 (42.4)	11.4 (52.5)	15.5 (59.9)	19.0 (66.2)	20.0 (68.0)	14.4 (57.9)	6.9 (44.4)	1.7 (35.1)	−3.2 (26.2)	−3.2 (26.2)
Average precipitation mm (inches)	70.4 (2.77)	54.7 (2.15)	116.5 (4.59)	161.1 (6.34)	217.4 (8.56)	282.2 (11.11)	172.1 (6.78)	138.3 (5.44)	69.9 (2.75)	68.3 (2.69)	59.6 (2.35)	50.6 (1.99)	1,461.1 (57.52)
Average precipitation days (≥ 0.1 mm)	12.8	12.6	17.5	16.6	17.5	19.7	17.1	14.0	8.9	7.1	8.5	9.0	161.3
Average snowy days	0.4	0.1	0	0	0	0	0	0	0	0	0	0.2	0.7
Average relative humidity (%)	78	79	82	81	81	83	79	79	77	75	76	75	79
Mean monthly sunshine hours	55.3	54.0	49.4	77.6	114.0	121.0	184.0	184.7	160.8	148.0	117.7	98.7	1,365.2
Percentage possible sunshine	17	17	13	20	28	30	44	46	44	42	36	30	31
Source: China Meteorological Administration
