= Fuli, Yangshuo County =

Fuli 福利镇
- Town
- Interactive map of Fuli
- Coordinates: 24°47′16″N 110°33′26″E
- Country: China
- Region: Guangxi
- Prefecture-level city: Guilin
- County: Yangshuo
- Time zone: UTC+8 (China Standard)

Fuli (simplified Chinese: 福利镇; traditional Chinese: 福利鎮; pinyin: Fúlì zhèn) is a town under the administration of Yangshuo County, Guangxi, China, located in the southeastern part of the county just east of the county seat.
