= Yangshuo County =

Yangshuo County 阳朔县 Yangso
- County
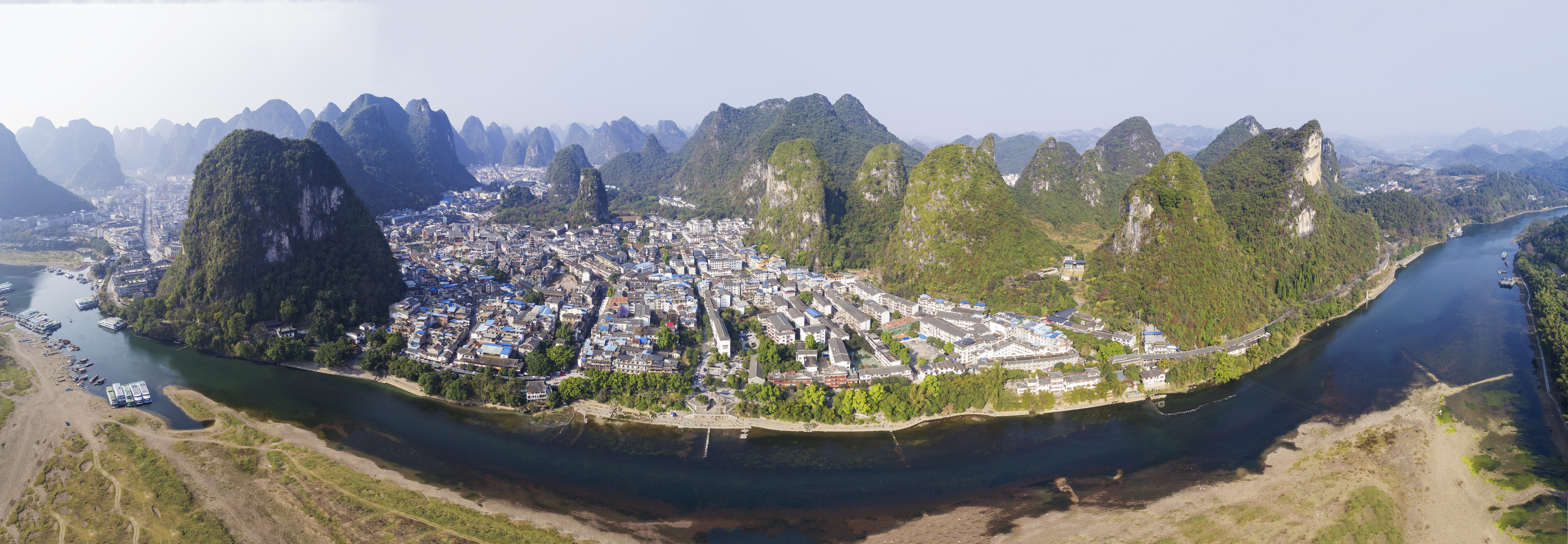
- Aerial view of Yangshuo from across the Li River

- Location of the seat in Guangxi
- Coordinates: 24°47′N 110°30′E
- Country: China
- Autonomous region: Guangxi
- Prefecture-level city: Guilin
- County seat: Yangshuo

Area
  - Total: 1,428 km^{2} (551 sq mi)

Population
  - Total: 300,000
  - Density: 210/km^{2} (540/sq mi)
- Time zone: UTC+8 (China Standard)
- Postal code: 541900
- Area code: 0773
- Website: www.yangshuo.gov.cn

Yangshuo County (simplified Chinese: 阳朔县; traditional Chinese: 陽朔縣; pinyin: Yángshuò Xiàn) is a county under the jurisdiction of Guilin City, in the northeast of Guangxi, China. Its seat is located in the town of Yangshuo. Surrounded by karst peaks and bordered on one side by the Li River, it is served by bus and by boat from nearby Guilin.

== History ==
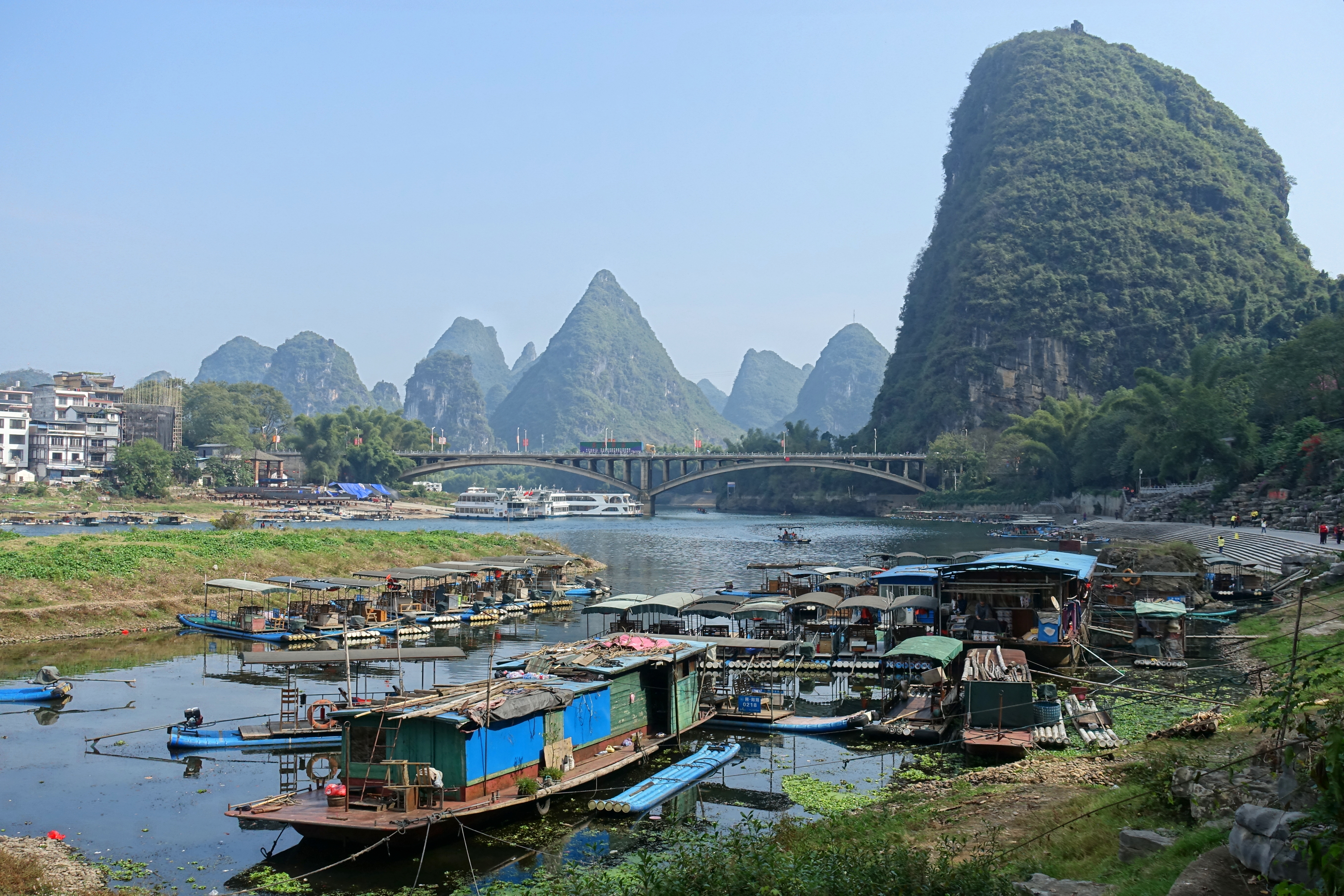
View of Li River from Yangshuo. Karst peaks are visible in the background.

The area has been inhabited for about 3,000 years.

In 590 CE, under Emperor Wen of Sui, Yangshuo County was incorporated. At the time, the county hosted a street 5 metres (16 ft) wide, and 200 metres (660 ft) long that would become contemporary West Street.

Yangshuo County would briefly fall under Japanese occupation in 1944, and Imperial Japanese troops looted many prominent local businesses in the county during that time.

By the 1970s, domestic tourism in Yangshuo County was commonplace, and the government made efforts to open up the county to foreign tourists, including European and American tourists. The area became a destination for young foreign backpackers, who would often visit during a gap year. Foreign tourism in Yangshuo County would grow rapidly in subsequent decades, with West Street serving as a major hub for foreign tourists. By the 1990s, nearly all shops on West Street were operated by foreigners, and organized tours in the area began. Foreign tourists in Yangshuo County would outnumber domestic tourists by 2005. Since West Street is popular with locals and foreigners alike, signs are written in both Chinese and English. Because of the relatively high number of foreign visitors, many locals speak some English, unlike most Chinese towns of its size.

The Yangshuo region has numerous locations for climbing, and they are accessible by bicycle, public bus, or taxi van. The most famous of these crags is Moon Hill, which has several lines graded 5.13 in the Yosemite scale. Other crags of note include Low Mountain, Twin Gates, Baby Frog, the Egg, Bamboo Grove, and Wine Bottle Cliff.

== Administrative divisions ==
Yangshuo County is divided into 6 towns and 3 townships:

Towns

- Yangshuo (阳朔镇)
- Baisha (白沙镇)
- Fuli (福利镇)
- Xingping (兴坪镇)
- Putao (葡萄镇)
- Gaotian (高田镇)

Townships

- Jinbao Township (金宝乡)
- Puyi (普益乡)
- Yangdi Township (杨堤乡)

== Economy ==
Tourism is a major component of Yangshuo County's economy. West Street serves as a major local focal point for tourism, receiving over 21.1 million tourists in 2023, and is lined with various tourist-oriented shops and restaurants. Due to the county's popularity with foreign tourists, including those who speak English, the county has a sizable English language learning industry.

== Climate ==
Climate data for Yangshuo, elevation 137 m (449 ft), (1991–2020 normals, extremes 1991–present)
Month	Jan	Feb	Mar	Apr	May	Jun	Jul	Aug	Sep	Oct	Nov	Dec	Year
Record high °C (°F)	28.6 (83.5)	32.9 (91.2)	32.2 (90.0)	36.0 (96.8)	37.1 (98.8)	37.1 (98.8)	39.9 (103.8)	39.2 (102.6)	38.4 (101.1)	36.7 (98.1)	32.9 (91.2)	28.3 (82.9)	39.9 (103.8)
Mean daily maximum °C (°F)	13.1 (55.6)	15.6 (60.1)	18.7 (65.7)	24.6 (76.3)	28.8 (83.8)	31.2 (88.2)	33.4 (92.1)	33.5 (92.3)	31.5 (88.7)	27.4 (81.3)	22.0 (71.6)	16.2 (61.2)	24.7 (76.4)
Daily mean °C (°F)	9.1 (48.4)	11.5 (52.7)	14.6 (58.3)	20.1 (68.2)	24.0 (75.2)	26.6 (79.9)	28.2 (82.8)	28.0 (82.4)	26.0 (78.8)	21.8 (71.2)	16.5 (61.7)	11.1 (52.0)	19.8 (67.6)
Mean daily minimum °C (°F)	6.6 (43.9)	8.8 (47.8)	12.0 (53.6)	17.0 (62.6)	20.9 (69.6)	23.7 (74.7)	24.8 (76.6)	24.5 (76.1)	22.3 (72.1)	17.9 (64.2)	12.9 (55.2)	7.9 (46.2)	16.6 (61.9)
Record low °C (°F)	−1.5 (29.3)	−2.0 (28.4)	2.2 (36.0)	5.5 (41.9)	12.2 (54.0)	16.0 (60.8)	18.3 (64.9)	18.3 (64.9)	13.6 (56.5)	8.0 (46.4)	2.7 (36.9)	−2.1 (28.2)	−2.1 (28.2)
Average precipitation mm (inches)	75.0 (2.95)	71.7 (2.82)	131.2 (5.17)	192.2 (7.57)	264.7 (10.42)	302.8 (11.92)	181.9 (7.16)	151.4 (5.96)	63.0 (2.48)	58.6 (2.31)	65.8 (2.59)	53.9 (2.12)	1,612.2 (63.47)
Average precipitation days (≥ 0.1 mm)	13.1	13.1	18.1	16.8	17.7	18.8	15.9	14.1	8.5	6.7	8.4	9.2	160.4
Average snowy days	0.3	0.2	0	0	0	0	0	0	0	0	0	0.1	0.6
Average relative humidity (%)	77	78	83	83	83	85	81	80	76	72	73	72	79
Mean monthly sunshine hours	59.2	52.4	48.2	77.1	113.4	123.7	187.5	189.7	167.2	154.2	122.1	103.6	1,398.3
Percentage possible sunshine	18	16	13	20	27	30	45	48	46	43	37	32	31
Source: China Meteorological Administration

== Landmarks ==
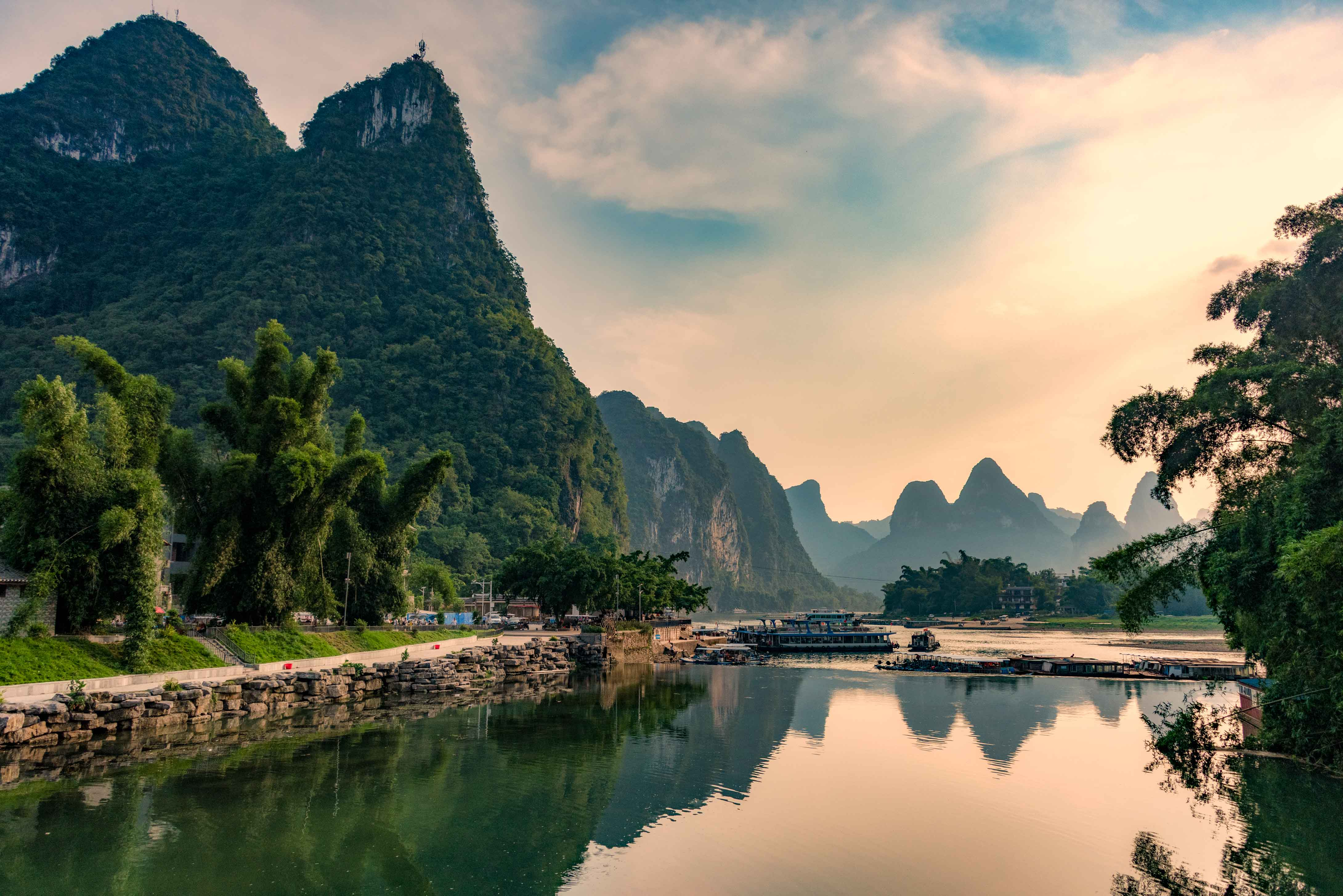
Li River in Yangshuo

- Li River
- Moon Hill
- Yulong River
- Silver Cave

== See also ==
- Baisha, Yangshuo County
- Putao, Guangxi
- Puyi Township, Guangxi

== Sister cities ==
Yangshuo has city partnerships with the following cities and/or regions:

- Morehead, Kentucky, United States (1994)
- Rapid City, South Dakota, United States (2000)
- Bled, Upper Carniola, Slovenia (2009)
- Annecy-le-Vieux, Haute Savoie, France (2011)

== Gallery ==
Yangshuo County

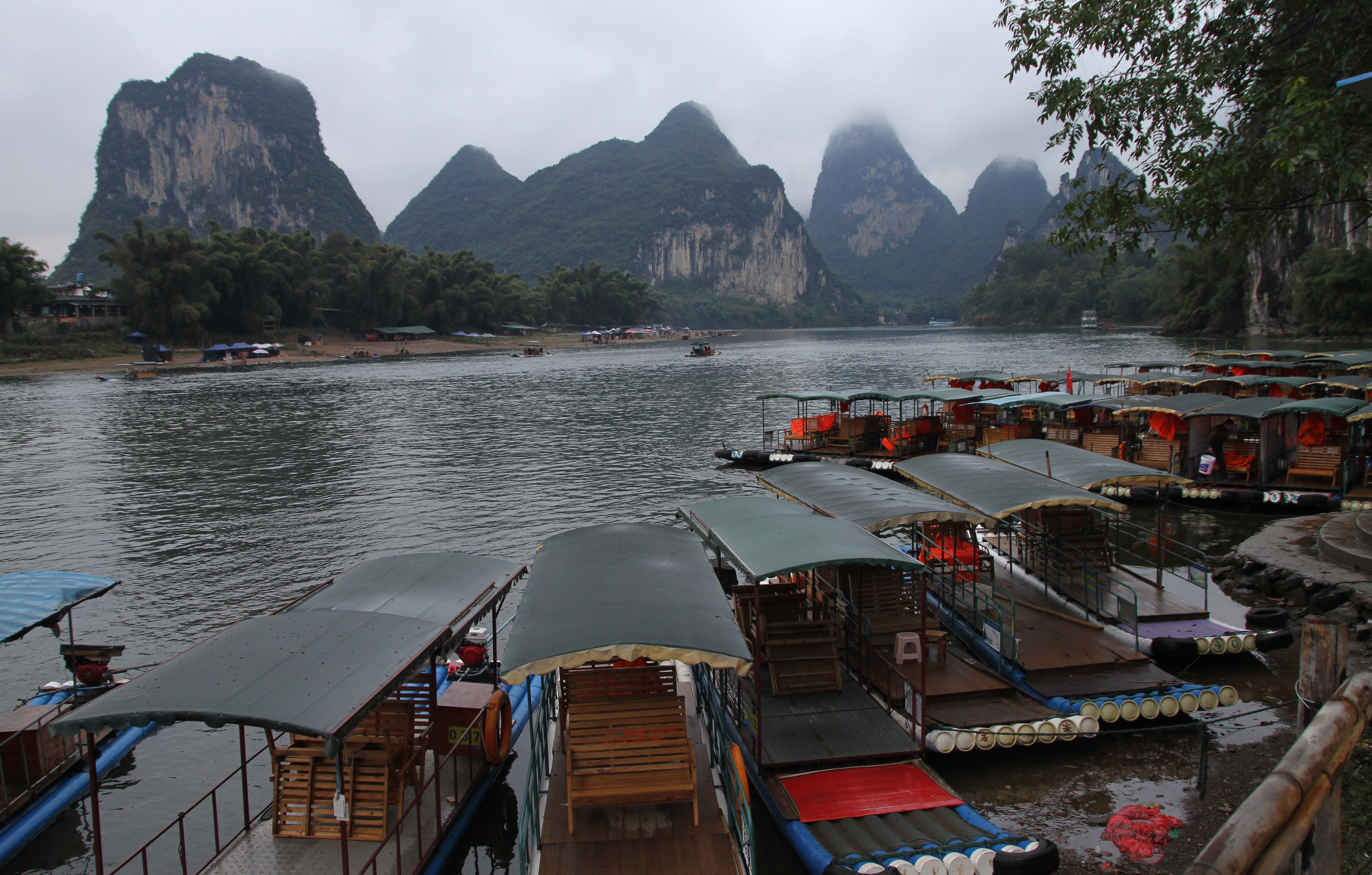
Li river

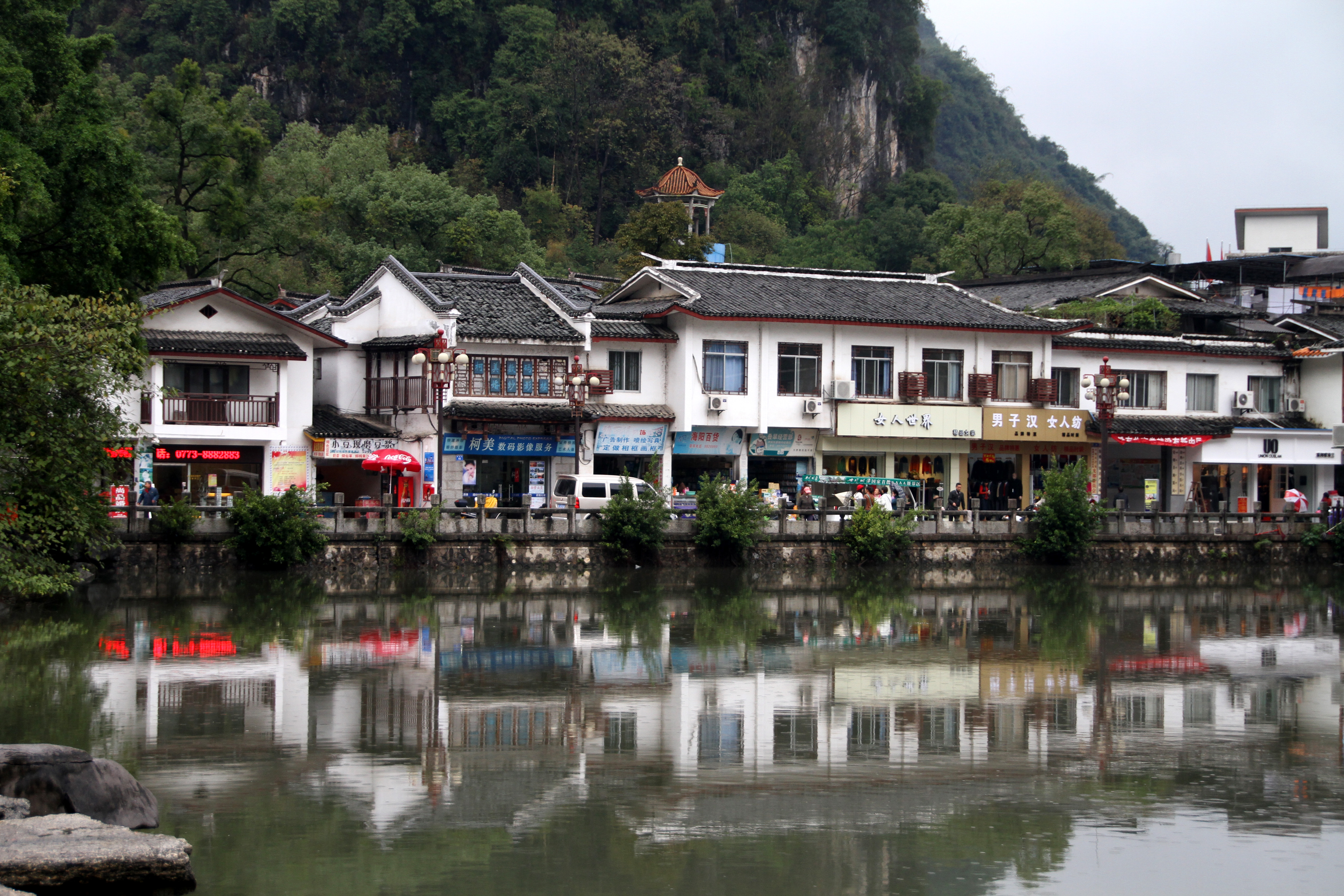
Waterfront

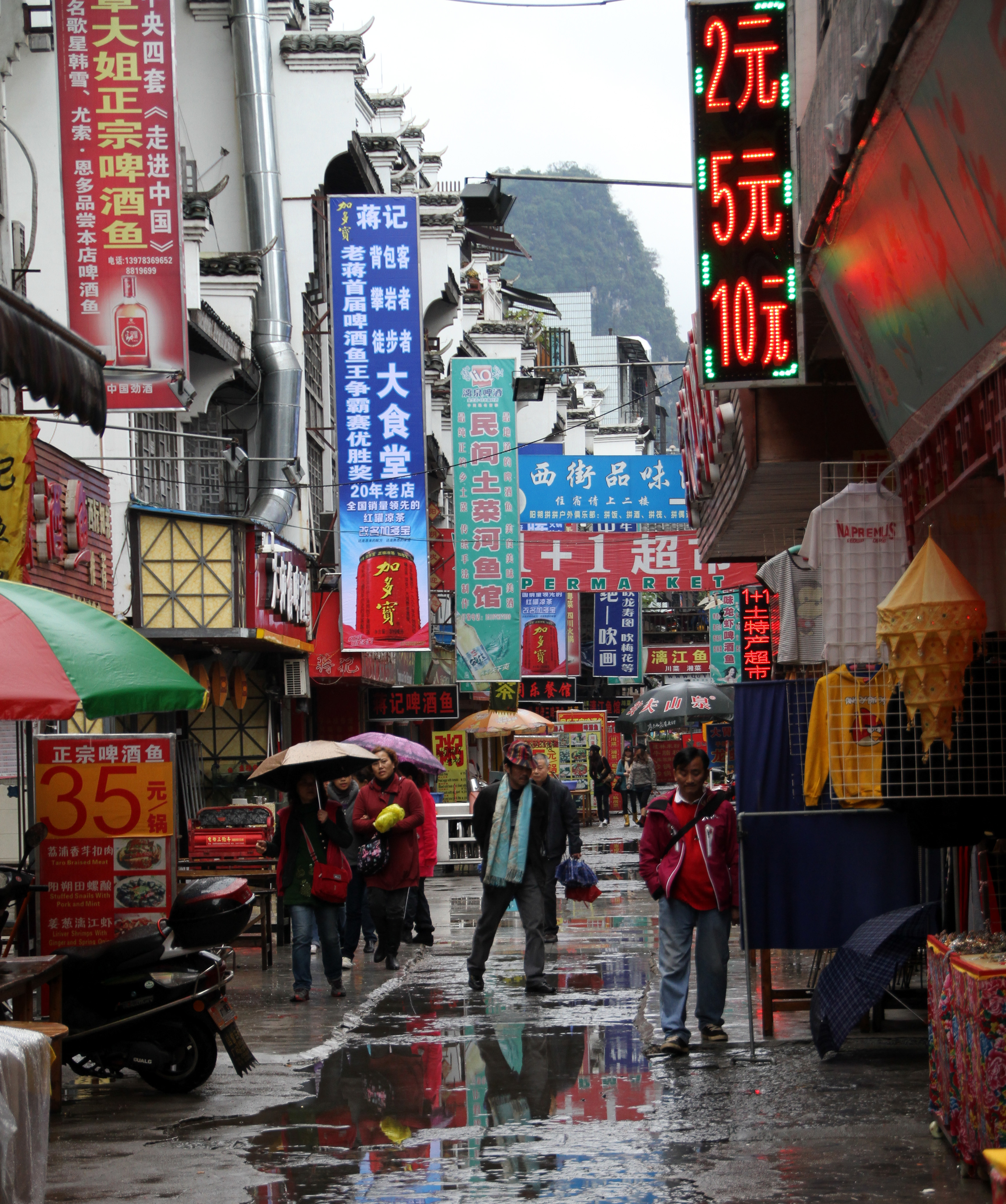
Street in Yangshuo

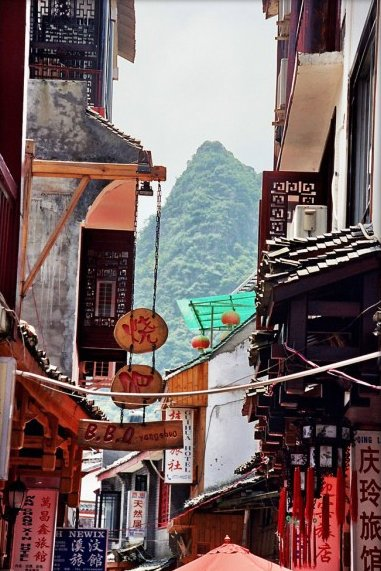
The town of Yangshuo

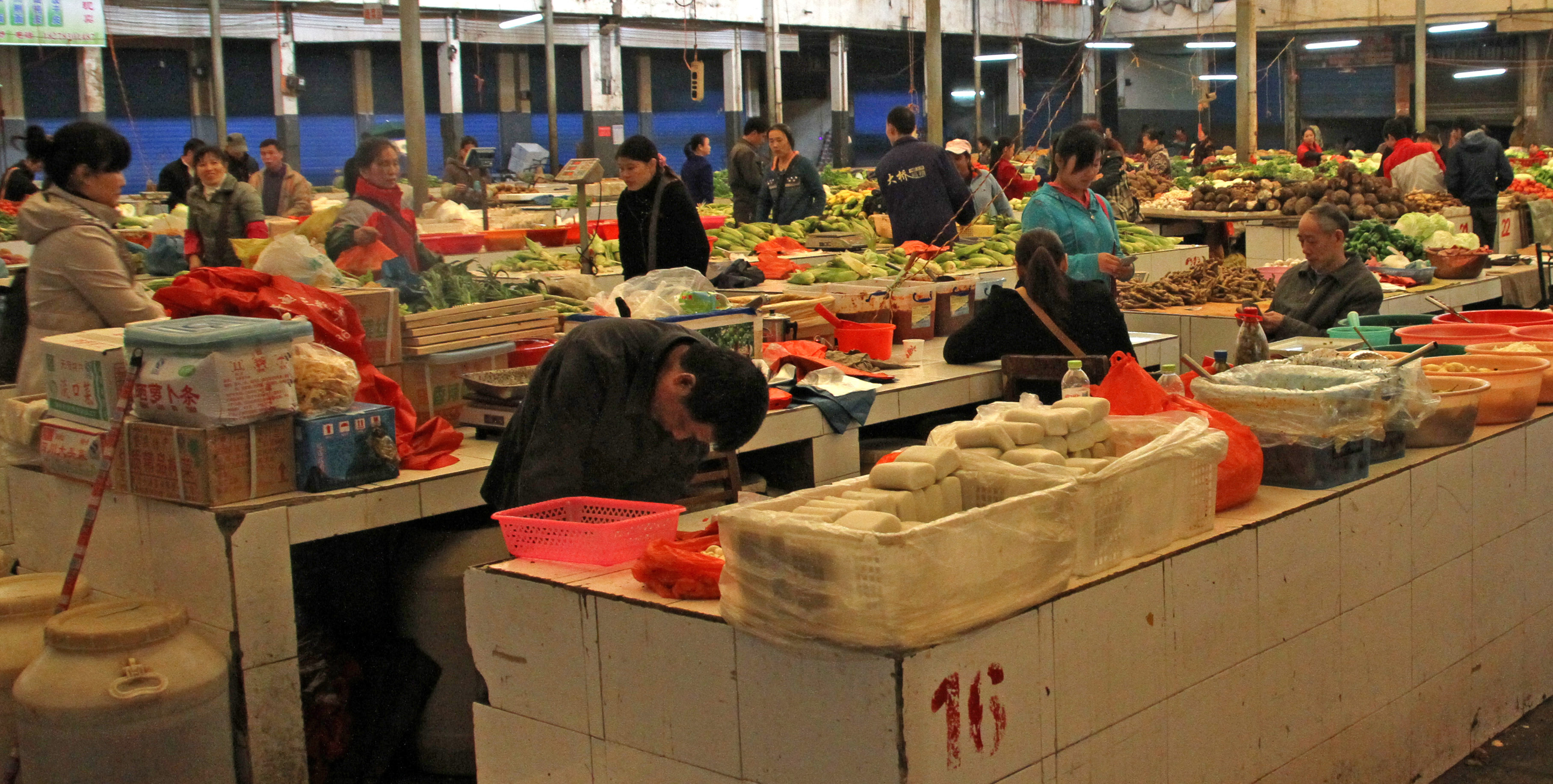
Market of Yangshuo

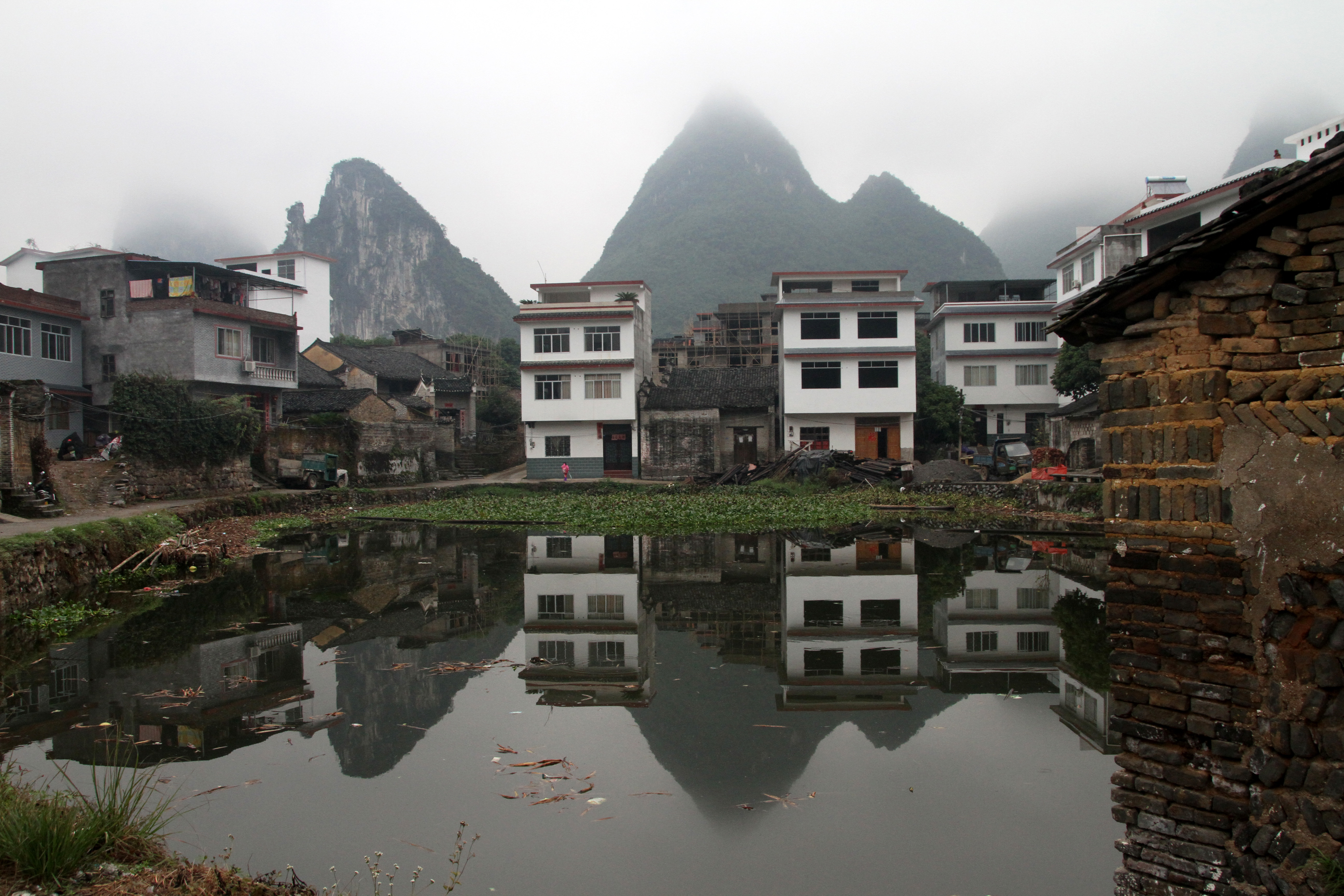
Mushan village

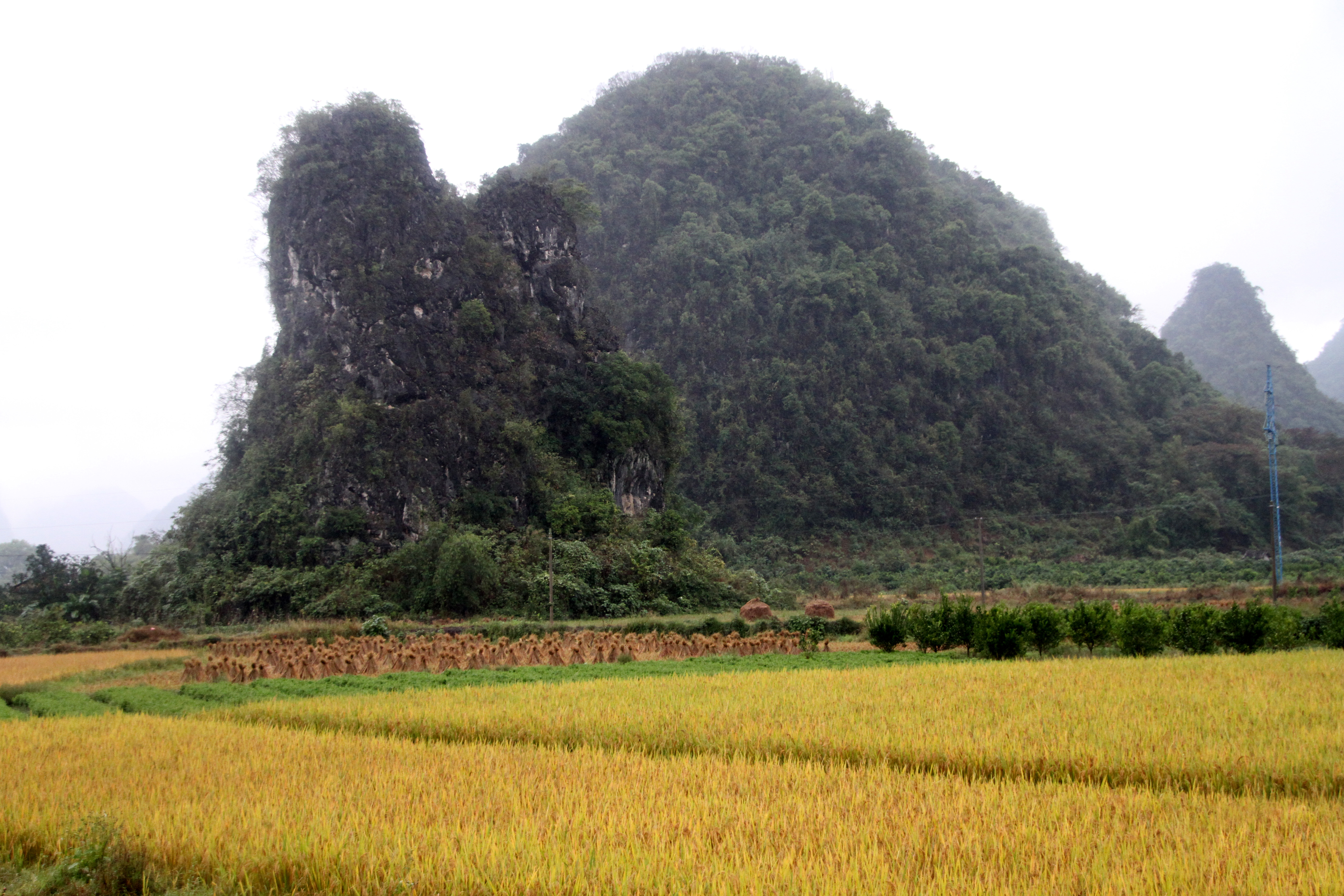
Farming between karst peaks

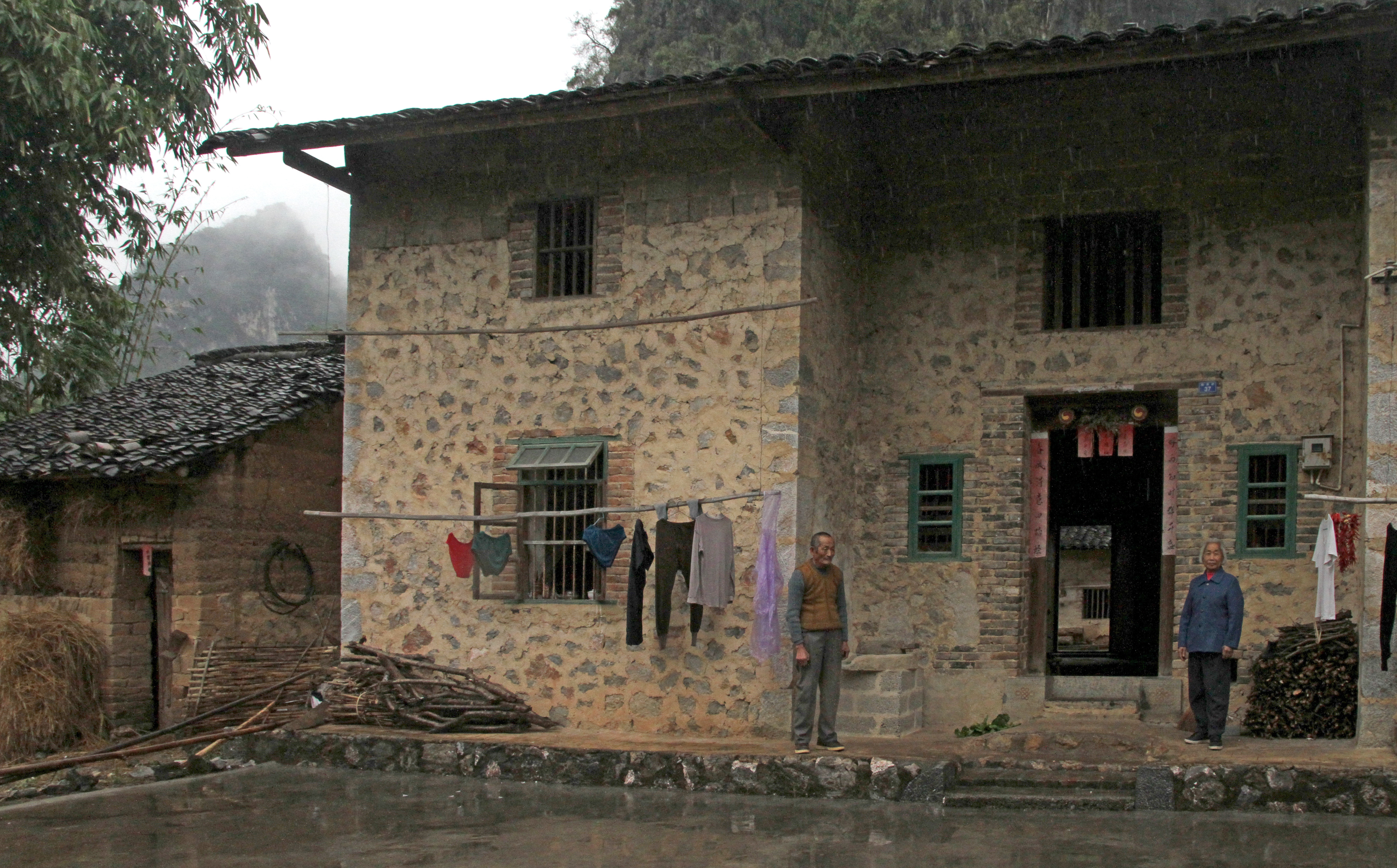
Farmer's home

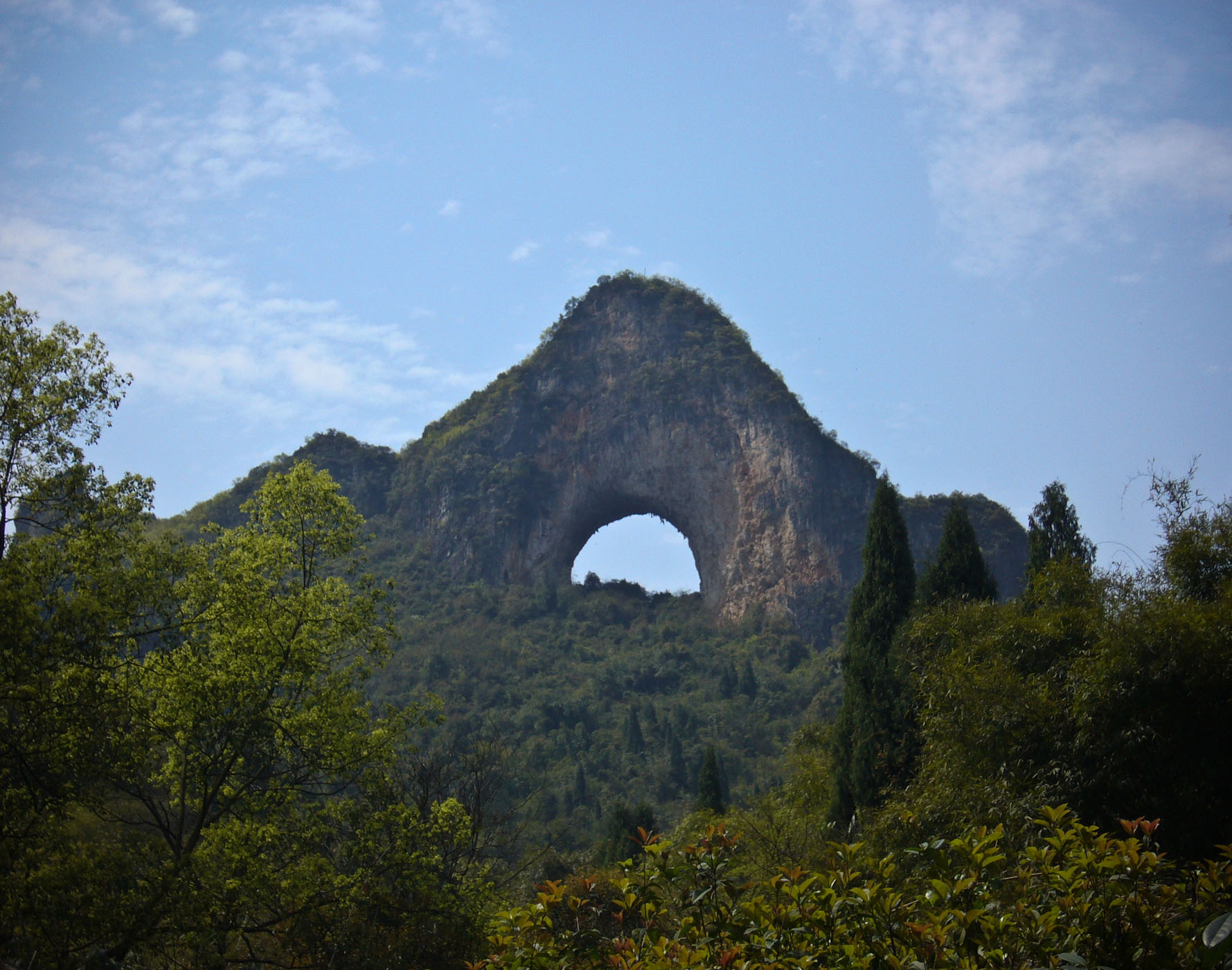
View of Moon Hill

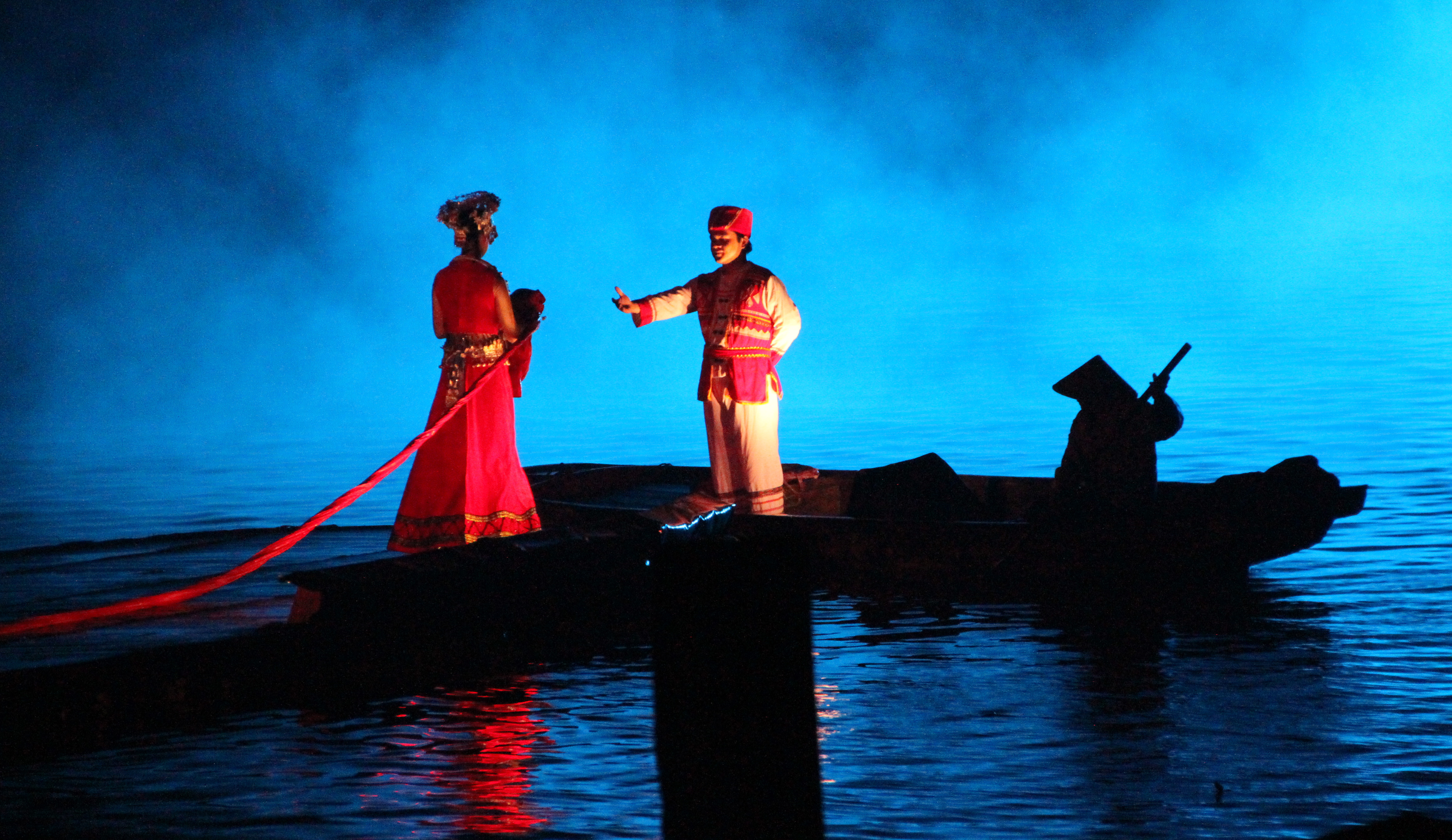
Impression Liu Sanjie
