= Knoellia subterranea =

Scientific classification
- Domain: Bacteria
- Kingdom: Bacillati
- Phylum: Actinomycetota
- Class: Actinomycetia
- Order: Micrococcales
- Family: Intrasporangiaceae
- Genus: Knoellia
- Species: K. subterranea

Binomial name
- Knoellia subterranea Groth et al. 2002.

Species of bacterium

Knoellia subterranea is a species of Gram positive, nonmotile, non-sporeforming bacteria. The bacteria are aerobic and mesophilic, and the cells can be irregular rods or coccoid. It was originally isolated from an air sample from cave soil from Reed Flute Cave in Guilin, China. K. sinensis was one of the first described species of Knoellia, being discovered along with the type strain K. sinensis. The species name refers to its subterranean isolation location

The optimum growth temperature for K. subterranea is 28-37 °C, but cannot grow at 42 °C. The optimum pH is 5.0-9.0.
