= Seven-star Cave =

Cave system in Guangxi, China

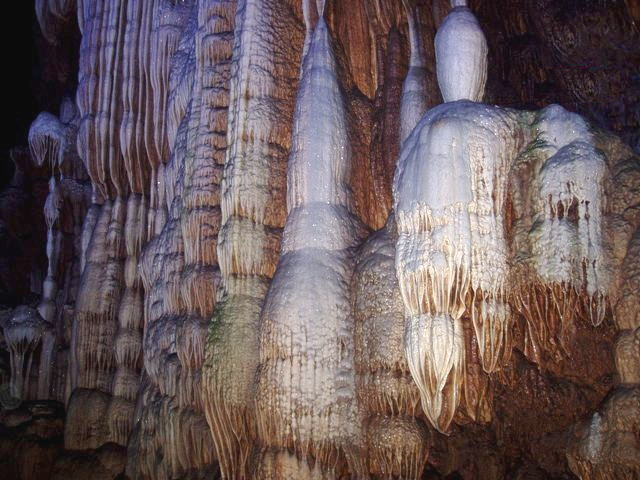
A limestone formation in Seven-Star Cave

Seven-Star Cave (Chinese: 七星岩; pinyin: Qīxīngyán) is an extensive limestone cave complex in Seven Star Park, both of which are popular tourist attractions in the city of Guilin in Guangxi Autonomous Region in China. The name derives from the fact the main karst limestone peaks form roughly the same pattern as the stars of the Big Dipper constellation. The earliest exploration of Seven-star Cave dates back to the Tang dynasty, about 1,300 years ago. The name can also be rendered Seven Stars Cave, Cave of Seven Stars, etc.

The cave has a year-round temperature of about 20 Celsius. The maximum ceiling height inside is 27 metres, and the maximum width is 49 metres. A concrete and stone tour path of approximately 1,000 metres runs through the cave between its entrance and exit points. Artificial lighting for walkways and displays is staged throughout, including colored accents, and various formations have been given names such as "A Natural Fresco" and "The Chessboard". During the Japanese invasion of China in World War II, Guilin residents took refuge in the cave complex.

The cave has scheduled tours about once per hour, conducted in Mandarin Chinese, usually with a megaphone irrespective of group size, explaining in detail the origins of various formation names, such as a dragon eating a bear, or a bear catching a tiger. The tour cannot easily be walked independently of groups, since the lights inside the cave are turned off behind the groups as they walk away. Signs are posted in both Chinese and English and takes typically 30–60 minutes.

Like most parks in Guilin, the cave complex maintains an entrance fee, costing 30 RMB beyond the basic park entrance fee of 75 RMB.
