= Knoellia =

Scientific classification
- Domain: Bacteria
- Kingdom: Bacillati
- Phylum: Actinomycetota
- Class: Actinomycetia
- Order: Micrococcales
- Family: Intrasporangiaceae
- Genus: Knoellia; Groth et al. 2002

Type species
- Knoellia sinensis Groth et al. 2002

Species
- K. aerolata Weon et al. 2007; K. flava Yu et al. 2012; K. locipacati Shin et al. 2012; K. remsis (Osman et al. 2007) Nouioui et al. 2018; K. sinensis Groth et al. 2002; K. subterranea Groth et al. 2002

Genus of bacteria

Knoellia is a genus of Gram positive, aerobic, non-endosporeforming bacteria. Species in this genus are mesophilic and have cells that are irregular rods or coccoid.

The genus was first proposed in 2002. The type species K. sinensis was first isolated from cave soil in Guilin, China. The genus is named after Hans Knöll, a German physician and microbiologist, and a "pioneer in antibiotic research. Other members of this genus have been initially isolated from soil, air, and pig manure. K. remsis was originally classified in the genus Tetrasphaera, but was reclassified into Knoellia in 2018.

Species from this genus produce white or cream-colored colonies on R2A agar, expect for K. flava, which produces yellow colonies. All species are mesophilic; optimum growth is between 28 and 35 °C and pH 5.0-9.0. K. remsis is the only species capable of growth above 42 °C.
