= K. sinensis =

K. sinensis may refer to:

- Knoellia sinensis, a Gram-positive bacterium.
- Kunpengopterus sinensis, an extinct wukongopterid pterosaur in the genus Kunpengopterus.
- Kurzia sinensis, a species of liverworts.
