= Knoellia sinensis =

Scientific classification
- Domain: Bacteria
- Kingdom: Bacillati
- Phylum: Actinomycetota
- Class: Actinomycetia
- Order: Micrococcales
- Family: Intrasporangiaceae
- Genus: Knoellia
- Species: K. sinensis

Binomial name
- Knoellia sinensis Groth et al. 2002

Species of bacterium

Knoellia sinensis is a species of Gram positive, nonmotile, non-sporeforming bacteria. The bacteria are aerobic and mesophilic, and the cells can be irregular rods or coccoid. It was originally isolated from an air sample from cave soil from Reed Flute Cave in Guilin, China. K. sinensis was discovered along with K. subterranea. The species name is derived from Latin sinensis (of China). K. sinensis is the type strain of the genus Knoellia.

The optimum growth temperature for K. sinensis is 28 °C, and cannot grow at temperatures of 37 °C or above. The optimum pH is 5.0-9.0.
