= Knoellia flava =

Scientific classification
- Domain: Bacteria
- Kingdom: Bacillati
- Phylum: Actinomycetota
- Class: Actinomycetia
- Order: Micrococcales
- Family: Intrasporangiaceae
- Genus: Knoellia
- Species: K. flava

Binomial name
- Knoellia flava Yu et al. 2012

Species of bacterium

Knoellia flava is a species of Gram positive, nonmotile, non-sporeforming bacteria. The bacteria are aerobic and mesophilic, and the cells can be irregular rods or coccoid. It was originally isolated from pig manure from Huazhong Agricultural University in Wuhan, China. The species name is derived from Latin flava (yellow), referring to the colony color of the species when grown on R2A agar.

The optimum growth temperature for K. flava is 28 °C and can grow in the 4-37 °C range. The optimum pH is 7.0, and can grow in pH 5.0-9.0.
