= Guilin College =

Private university in Guilin, Guangxi, China

- 桂林学院
- Former name: Lijiang College of Guangxi Normal University
- Motto: 向学、向善、自律、自强
- Type: Private
- Established: 2001; 25 years ago
- Academic staff: 710
- Students: 12,640
- Location: Guilin, Guangxi, China; 25.098°N 110.274°E
- Campus: Suburb
- Website: www.glc.edu.cn

Guilin College (simplified Chinese: 桂林学院; traditional Chinese: 桂林學院), formerly Lijiang College of Guangxi Normal University, is a private university in Guilin, Guangxi. It sits on a 520,000-square-meter campus adjacent to Guangxi Normal University, Yanshan Campus.

Founded in 2001 as an independent college conducted by Guangxi Normal University, it transformed into Guilin College in 2021.
