= Knoellia locipacati =

Scientific classification
- Domain: Bacteria
- Kingdom: Bacillati
- Phylum: Actinomycetota
- Class: Actinomycetia
- Order: Micrococcales
- Family: Intrasporangiaceae
- Genus: Knoellia
- Species: K. locipacati

Binomial name
- Knoellia locipacati Shin et al. 2012

Species of bacterium

Knoellia locipacati is a species of Gram positive, nonmotile, non-sporeforming bacteria. The bacteria are aerobic and mesophilic, and the cells can be irregular rods or coccoid. It was originally isolated from soil from the Korean Demilitarized Zone. The species name is derived from Latin locus (a place, country region) and pacatus (pacified, peaceful, quiet).

The optimum growth temperature for K. locipacati is 30 °C (86 °F) and can grow in the 10–37 °C (50–99 °F) range. The optimum pH is 7.0-8.0, and can grow in pH 6.0-9.0.
