= Knoellia aerolata =

Scientific classification
- Domain: Bacteria
- Kingdom: Bacillati
- Phylum: Actinomycetota
- Class: Actinomycetia
- Order: Micrococcales
- Family: Intrasporangiaceae
- Genus: Knoellia
- Species: K. aerolata

Binomial name
- Knoellia aerolata Weon et al. 2007

Species of bacterium

Knoellia aerolata is a species of Gram positive, nonmotile, non-sporeforming bacteria. The bacteria are aerobic and mesophilic, and the cells can be irregular rods or coccoid. It was originally isolated from an air sample from Suwon City, South Korea. The species name is derived from Latin aer (air) and latus (carried).

The optimum growth temperature for K. aerolata is 30 °C and can grow in the 5-35 °C range. The optimum pH is 6.0-7.0, and can grow in pH 5.0-9.0.
