= Knoellia remsis =

Scientific classification
- Domain: Bacteria
- Kingdom: Bacillati
- Phylum: Actinomycetota
- Class: Actinomycetia
- Order: Micrococcales
- Family: Intrasporangiaceae
- Genus: Knoellia
- Species: K. remsis

Binomial name
- Knoellia remsis (Osman et al. 2007) Nouioui et al. 2018

Synonyms
- Tetrasphaera remsis Osman et al. 2007

Species of bacterium

Knoellia remsis a species of Gram positive, nonmotile, non-sporeforming bacteria. The bacteria are aerobic and mesophilic, and the cells are coccoid that group in pairs, tetrads, or clusters. It was originally isolated from an air sample from the Regenerative Enclosed Life Support Module Simulator, which was a system designed to simulate life aboard the International Space Station. The species is named after REMS, the acronym for the Regenerative Enclosed Life Support Module Simulator. The species was originally classified as Tetrasphaera remsis in 2007, but was reclassified into the genus Knoellia in 2018.

The optimum growth temperature for K. remsis is 25 °C and can grow in the 10-45 °C range. The optimum pH is 7.0, and can grow in pH 6.0-9.0.
