= Qixing District =

Qixing 七星区 · Gihsingh Gih
- District
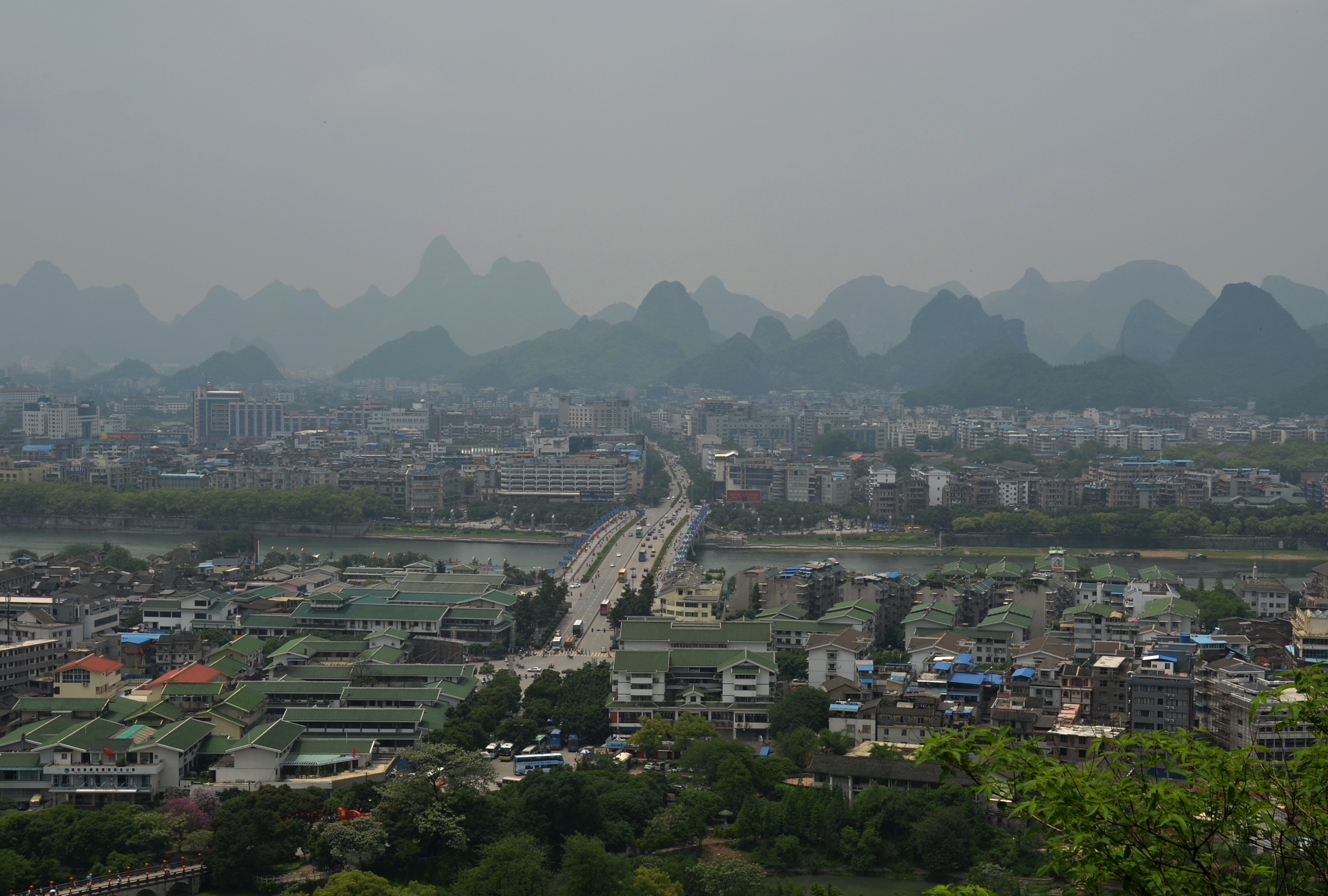
- Guilin in 2011

- Location in Guangxi
- Coordinates: 25°15′11″N 110°19′05″E
- Country: China
- Autonomous region: Guangxi
- Prefecture-level city: Guilin
- District seat: Lidong Subdistrict

Area
  - Total: 74 km^{2} (29 sq mi)
- Time zone: UTC+8 (China Standard)

Qixing District (Chinese: 七星区; pinyin: Qīxīng Qū; Zhuang: Gihsingh Gih) is a district of the city of Guilin, Guangxi, China.

== Administrative divisions ==
Qixing District is divided into 4 subdistricts, 1 township and 1 other:

Qixingqu Subdistrict (七星区街道), Dongjiang Subdistrict (东江街道), Chuanshan Subdistrict (穿山街道), Lidong Subdistrict (漓东街道), Chaoyang Township (朝阳乡), and Guilin Overseas Chinese Tourism Economic Zone Management Committee (桂林华侨旅游经济区管理委员会).
