= SevenStar Scenic Area =

Park in Guangxi, China

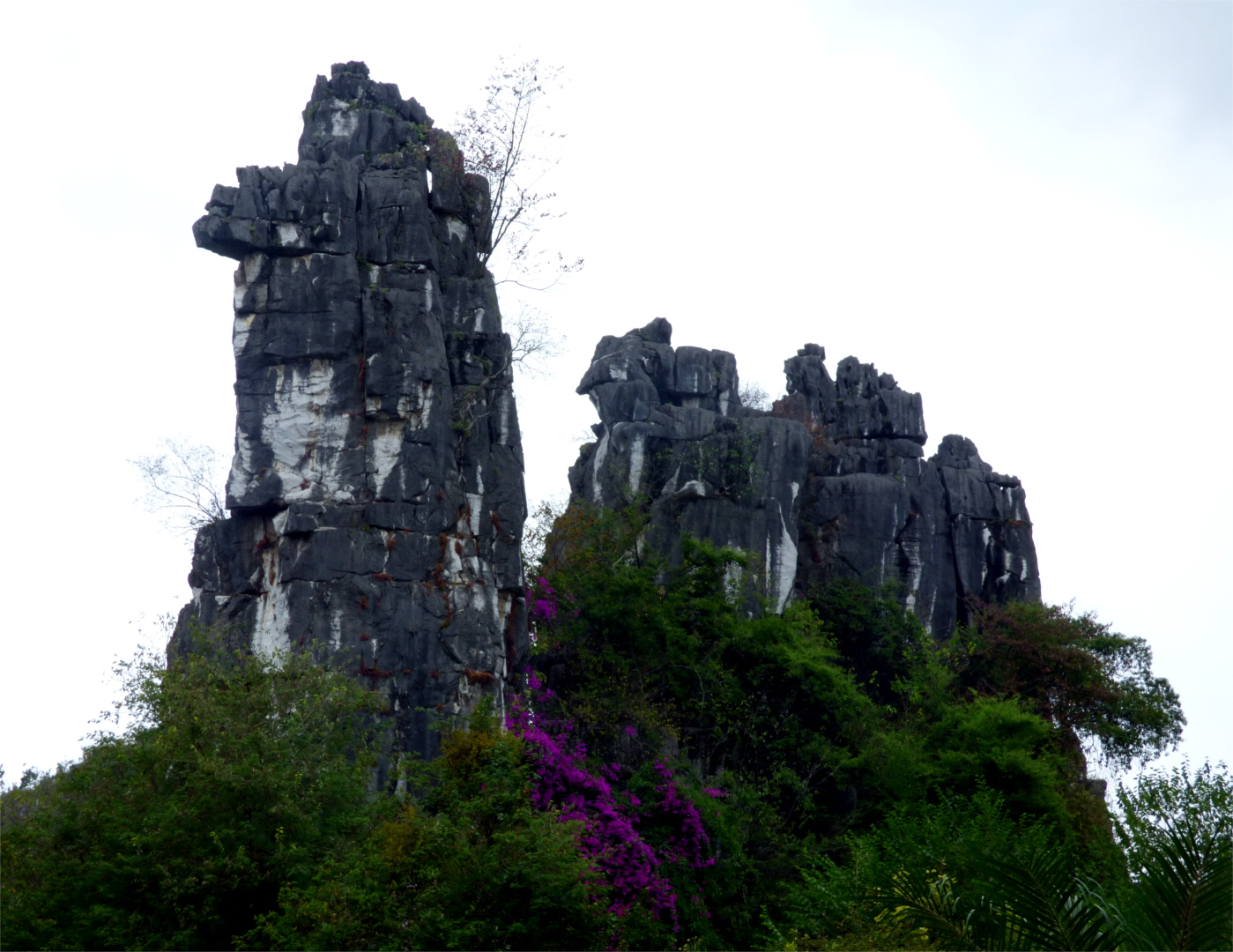
The 'Camel Hill' formation in the eastern Part of the SevenStar Scenic Area

Seven Star Scenic Area, formerly Seven Star Park, is located in Qixing district (七星区). The park itself encompasses 7 hills, hence its name.

== Attractions ==
=== Seven-Star Cave ===
An extensive limestone cave complex in the park.
