= Reed Flute Cave =

Cave and tourist attraction in Guangxi, China

Reed Flute Cave (芦笛岩)
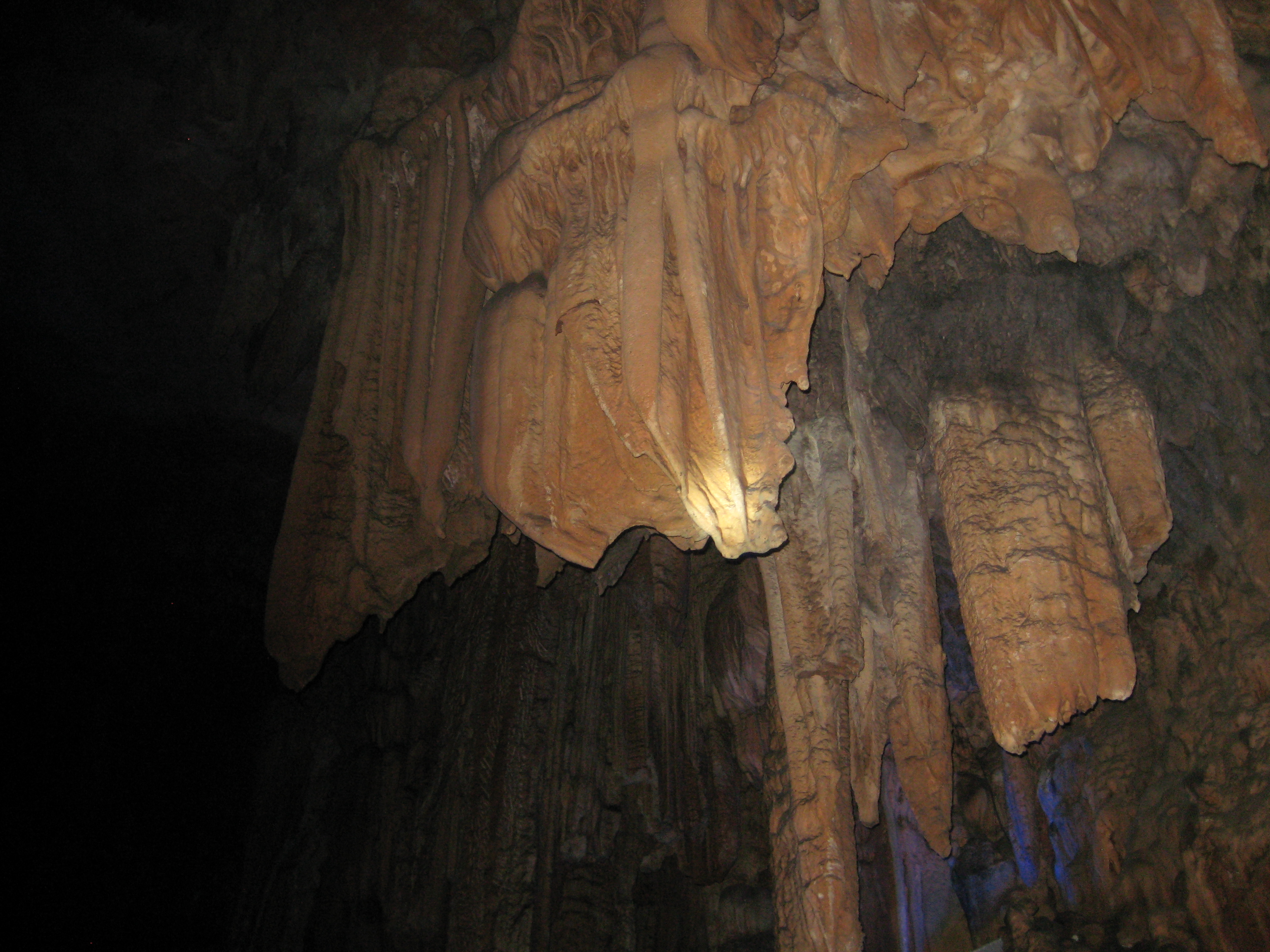
- Interactive map of Reed Flute Cave (芦笛岩)
- Location: Guilin, China
- Coordinates: 25°18′16″N 110°16′32″E
- Length: 240m
- Entrances: 3
- Access: by foot

The Reed Flute Cave (Chinese: 芦笛岩; pinyin: Lúdí Yán), also known as "the Palace of Natural Arts," is a landmark and tourist attraction in Guilin, Guangxi, China.

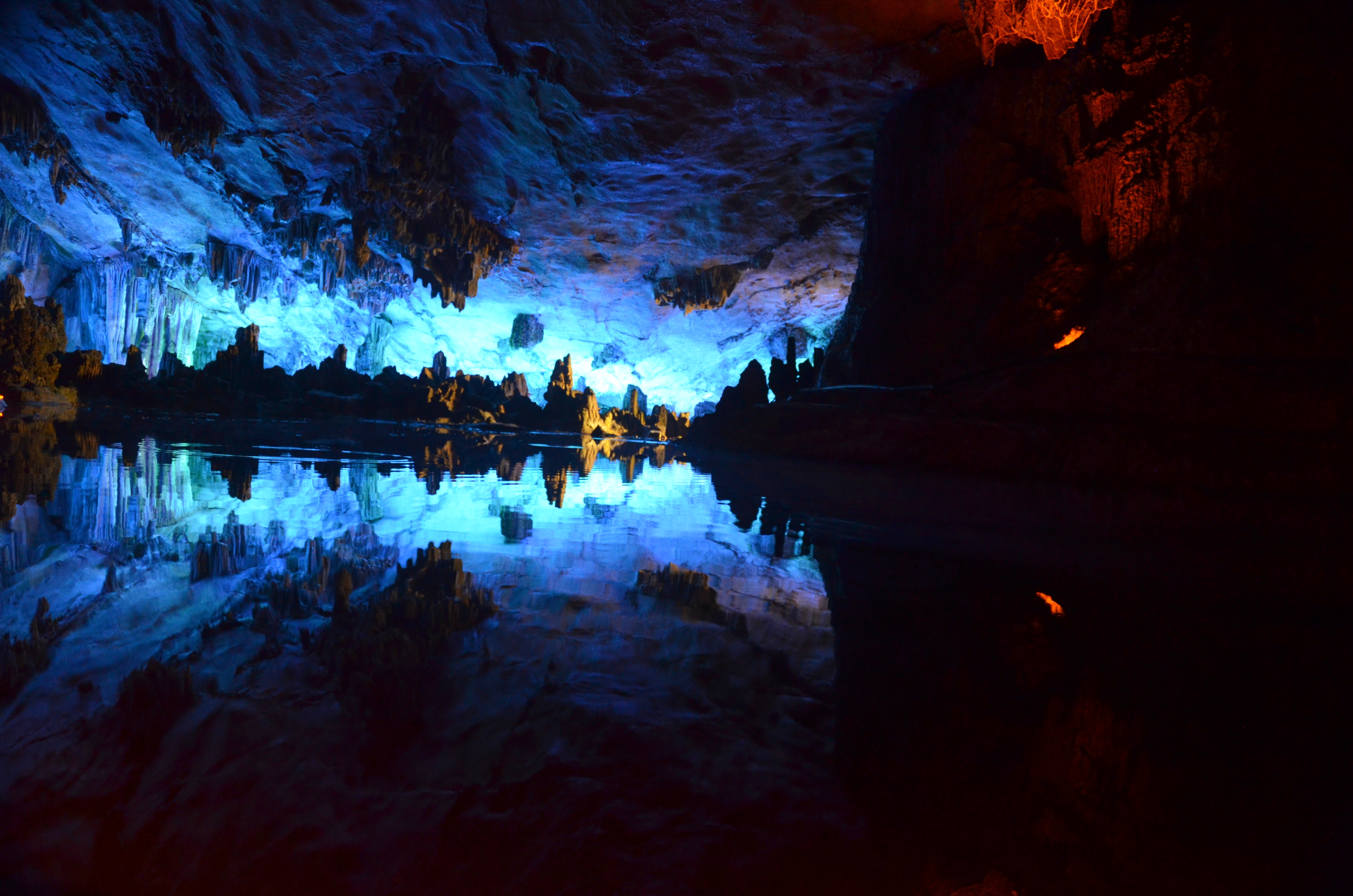
Lake inside the cave, with artificial lighting

The cave got its name from the type of reed growing outside, which can be made into flutes. Reed Flute Cave is filled with a large number of stalactites, stalagmites and other rock formations. Inside, there are more than 70 inscriptions of poems and travelogues written in ink, the oldest of which can be dated to 792 AD in the Tang dynasty. It was rediscovered in the 1940s by a group of refugees fleeing the Japanese troops. Nowadays, multicolored lighting artificially illuminates the cave. The Reed Flute Cave is filled with various stalactites and stalagmites, which are named according to what they look like and the legends surrounding them, Crystal Palace, Fish Tail Peak, and Dragon Pagoda. One giant stalactite is said to have been the magic spear of the Dragon King, used by the Monkey King Sun Wukong in the Chinese Buddhist classic, Journey to the West.
