= Guilin =

Prefecture-level city in Guangxi

Guilin 桂林市· Gveilinz Si
- Prefecture-level city
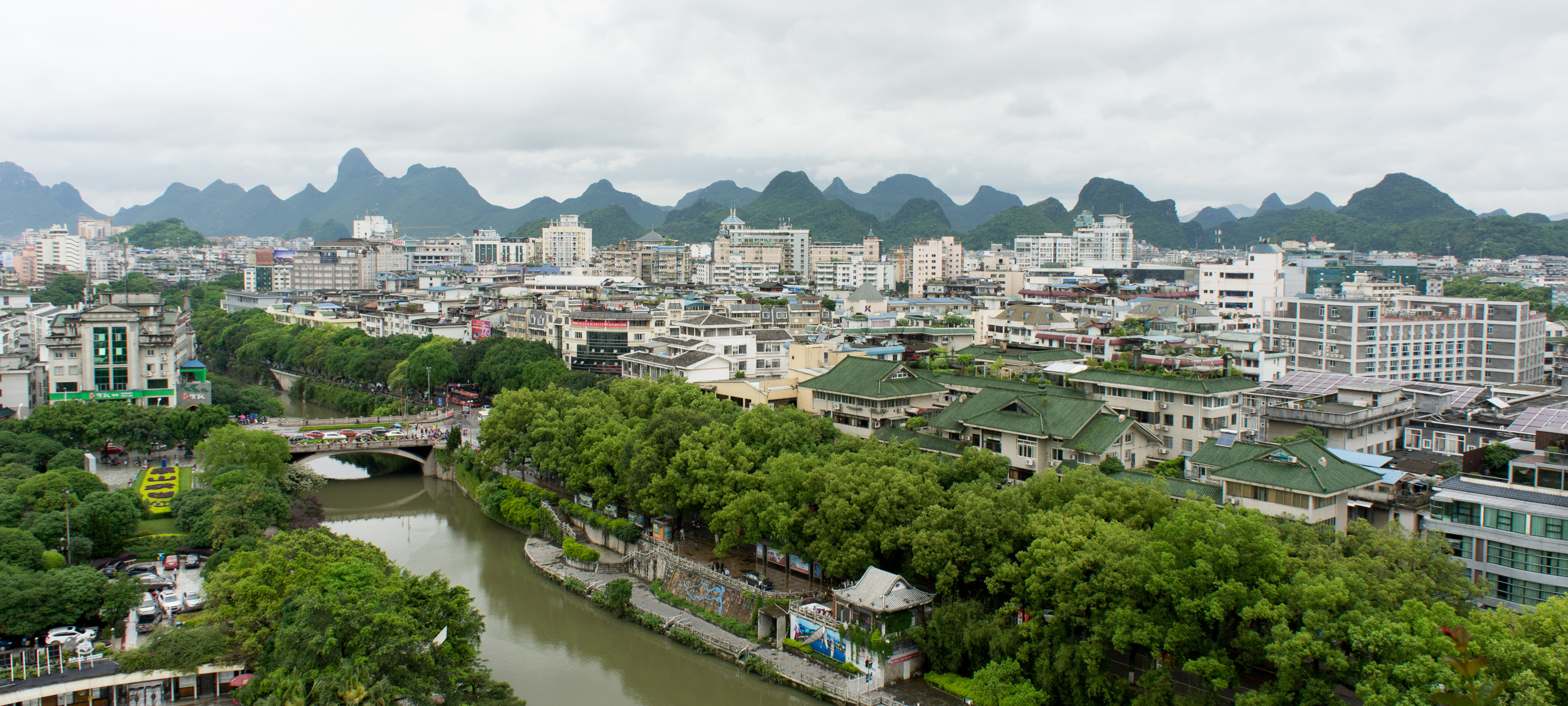
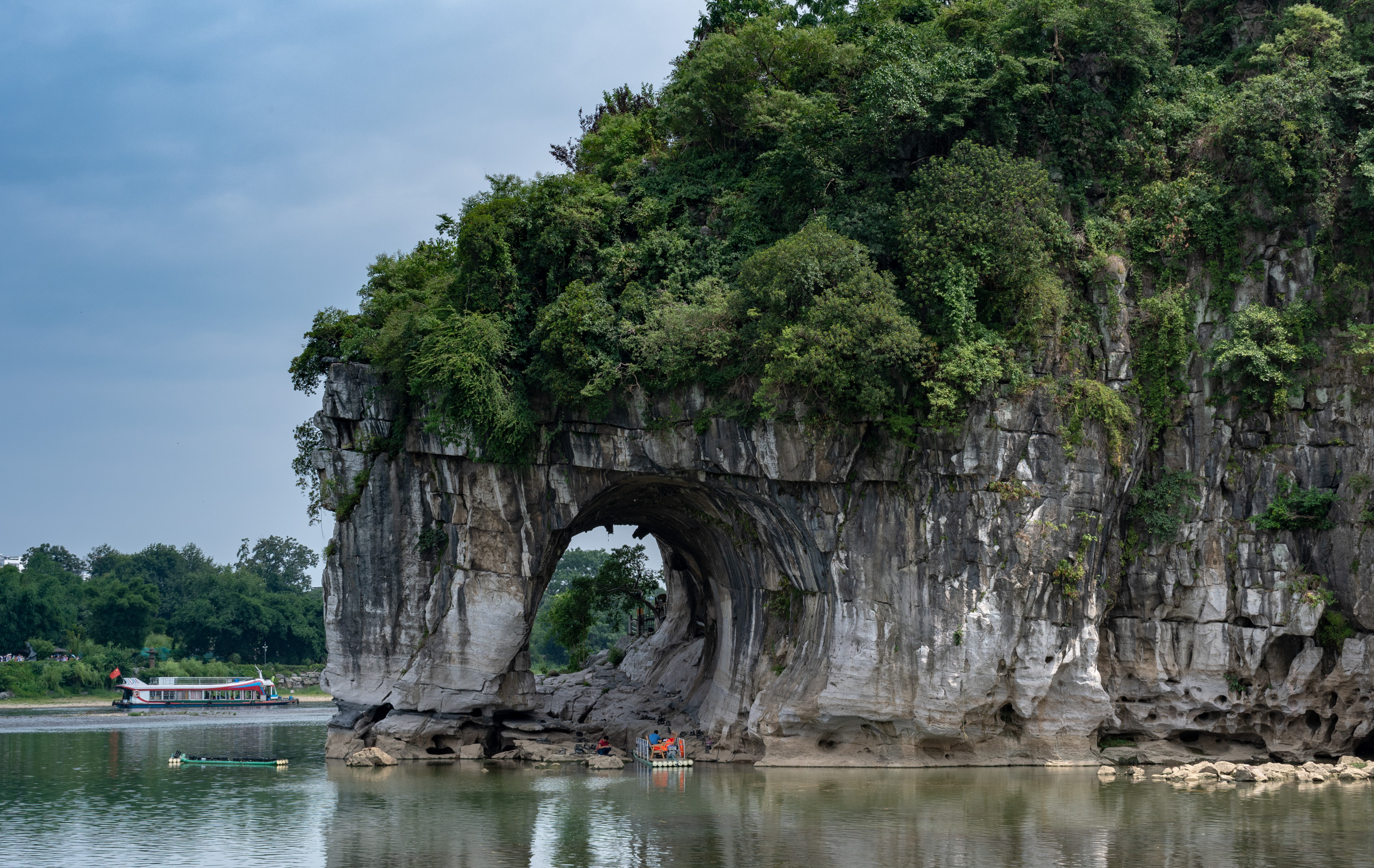
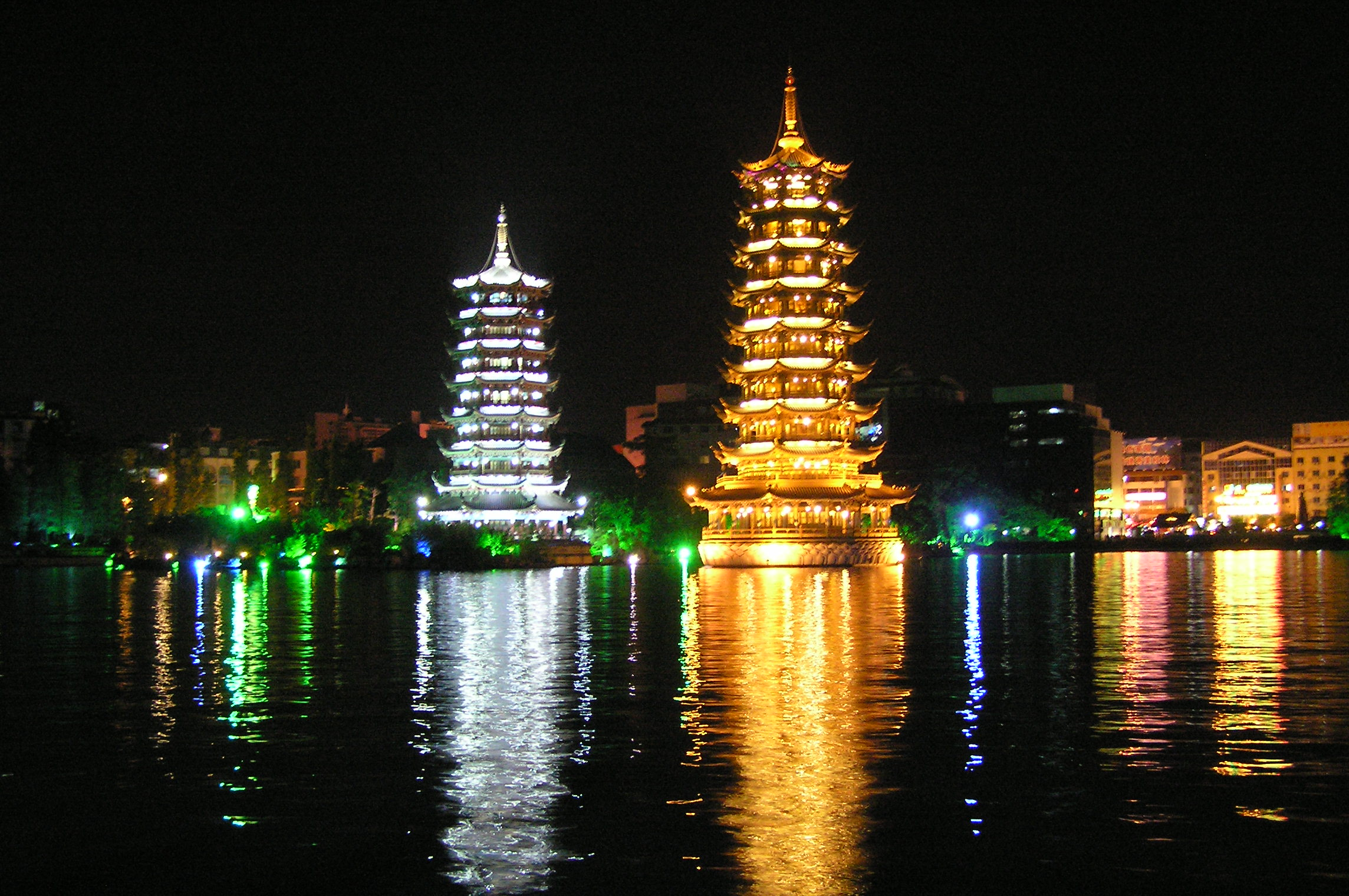
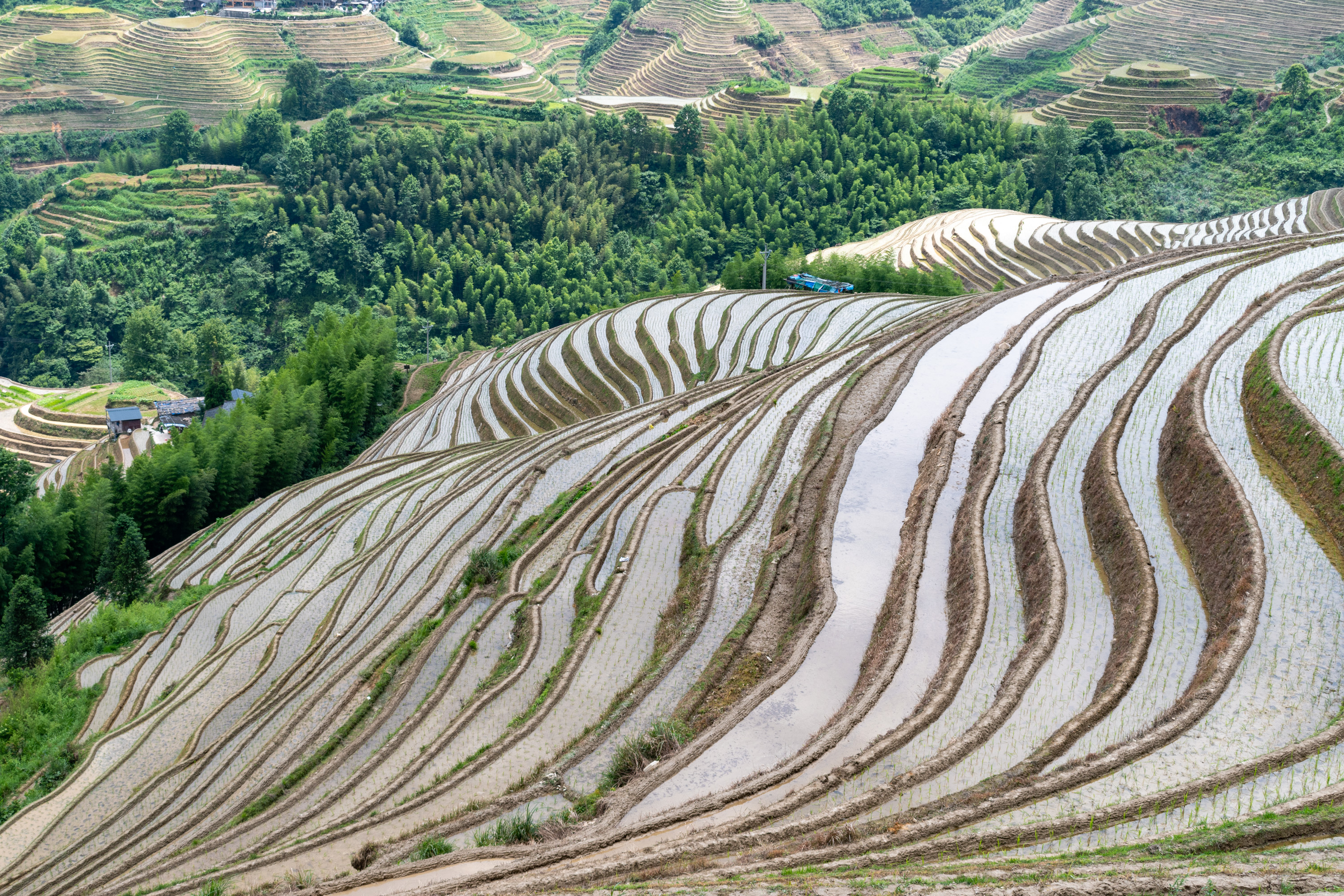
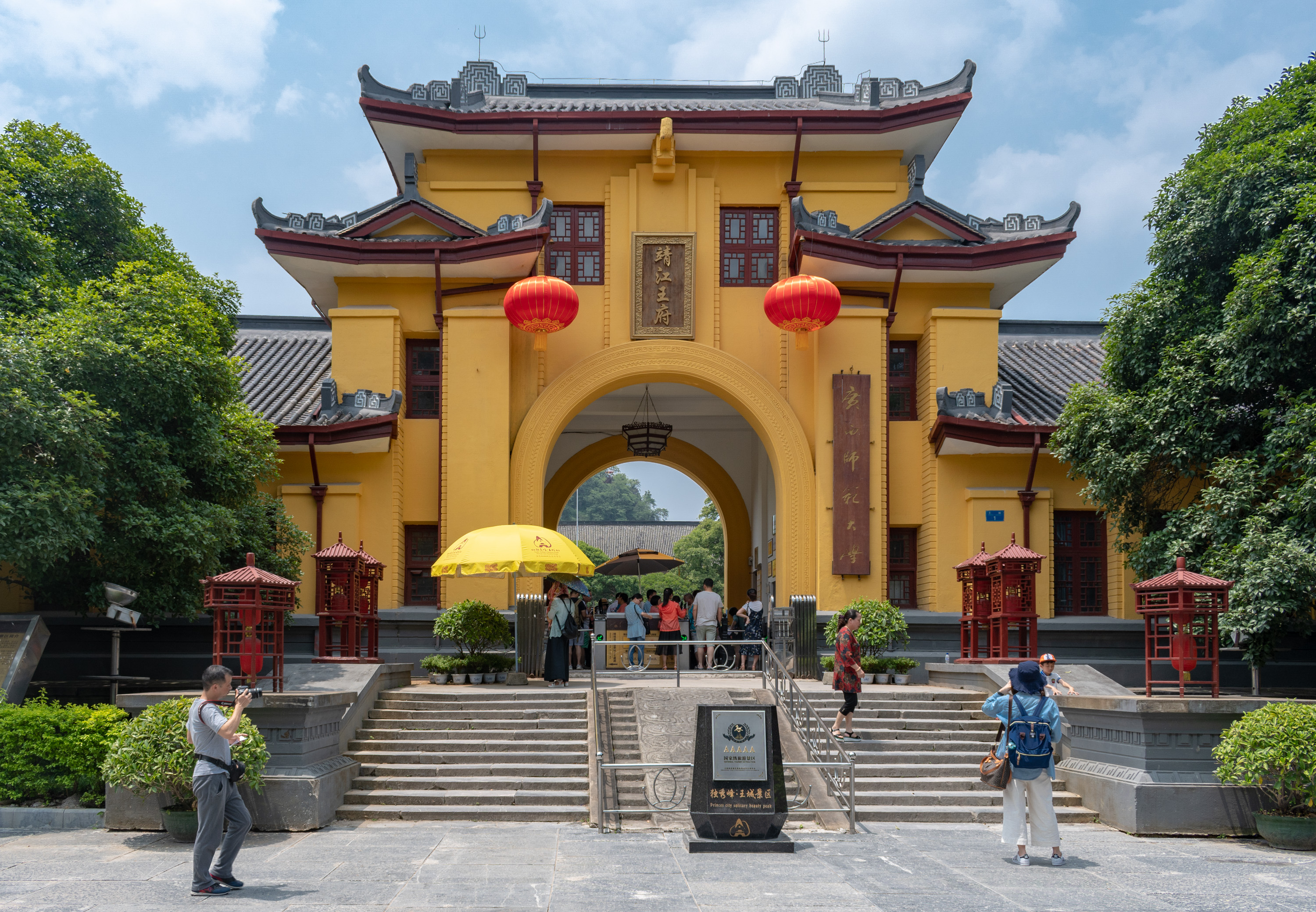
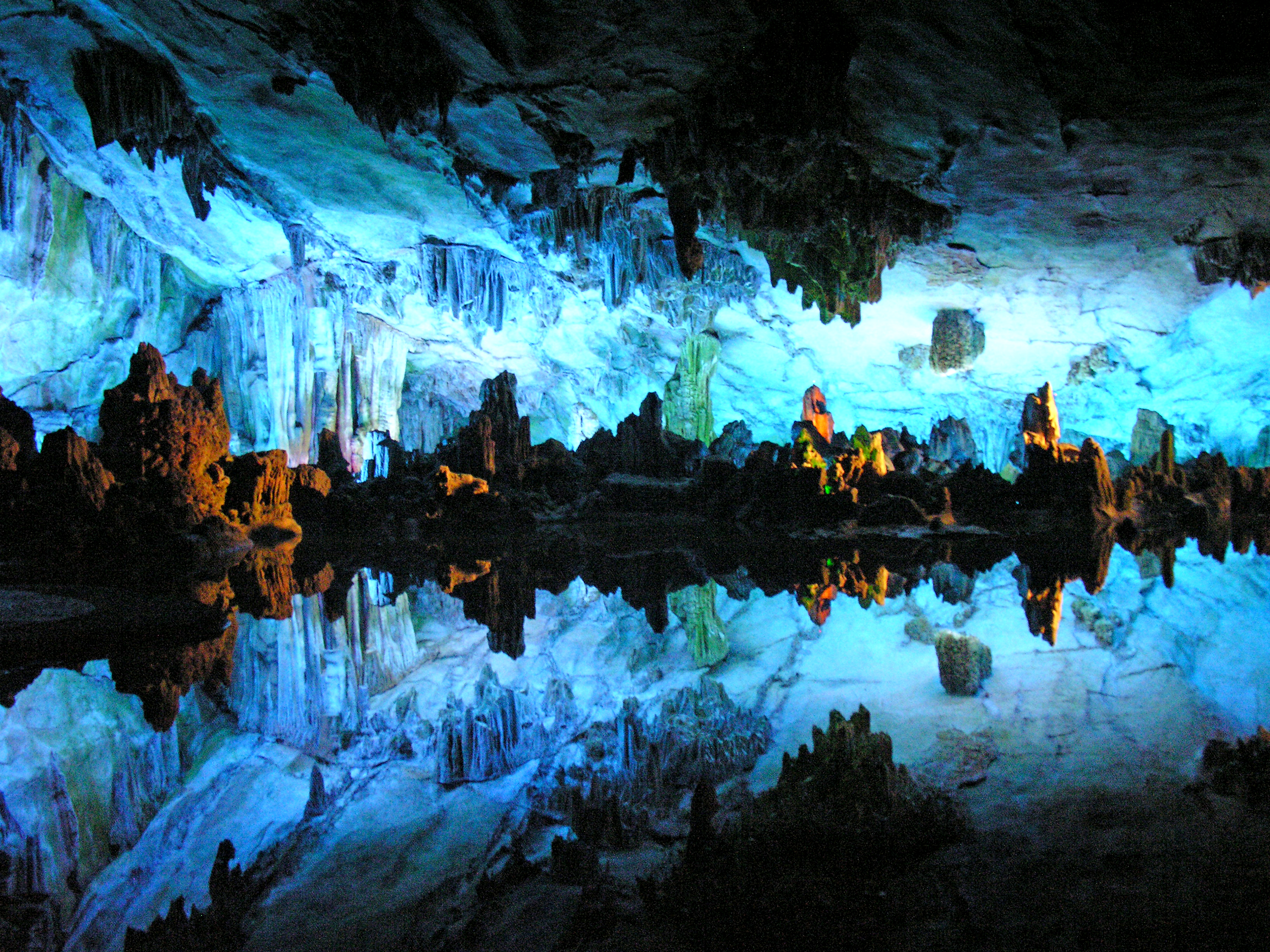
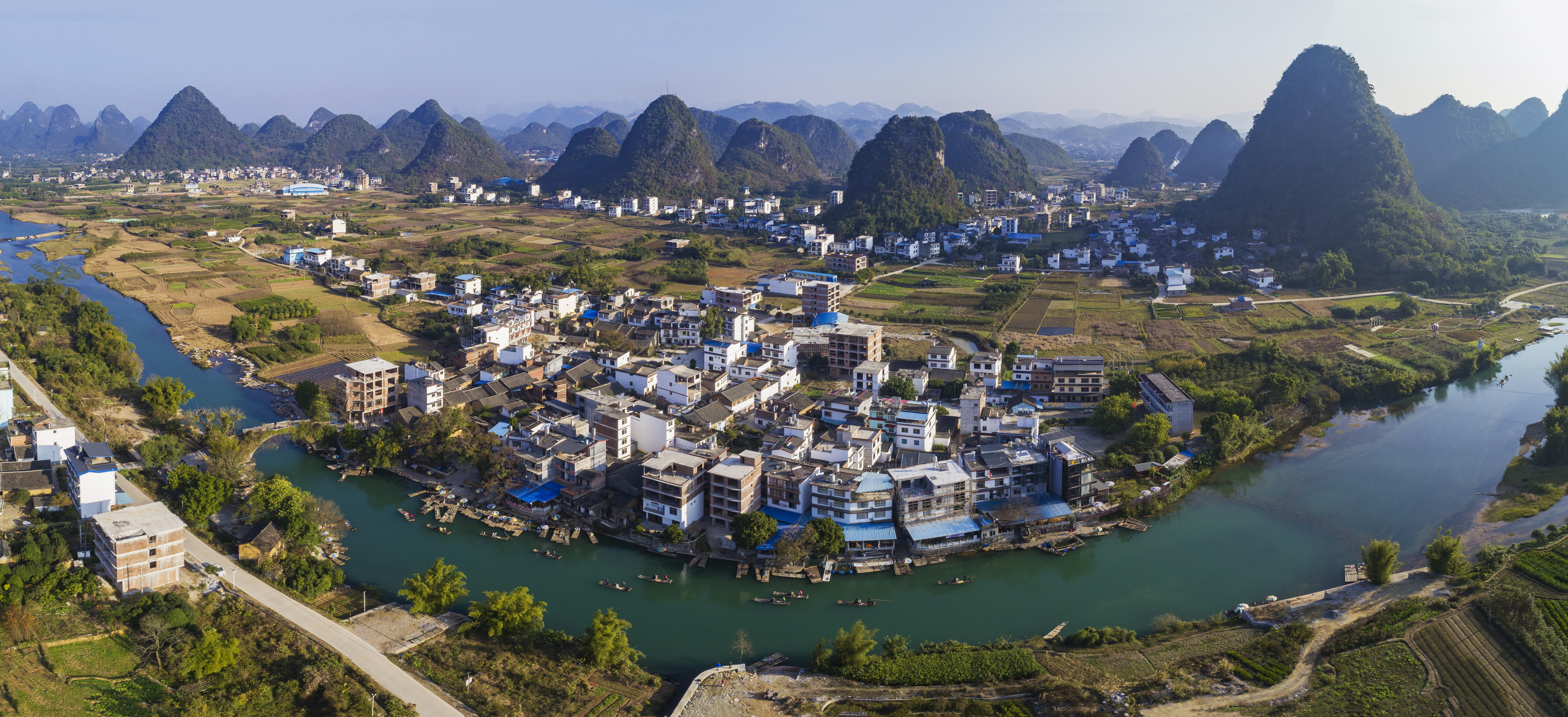
- View of Guilin Elephant Trunk Hill Sun and Moon Pagodas Longsheng Rice Terraces Jingjiang Princes' Palace Reed Flute Cave Yangshuo scenery

- Location of Guilin City jurisdiction in Guangxi

- Location in China
- Coordinates (Guilin Central Square (桂林中心广场)): 25°16′30″N 110°17′46″E
- Country: People's Republic of China
- Autonomous region: Guangxi
- Municipal seat: Lingui District

Area
  - Prefecture-level city: 27,797 km^{2} (10,732 sq mi)
  - Urban: 2,753 km^{2} (1,063 sq mi)
  - Metro: 5,041 km^{2} (1,946 sq mi)
- Elevation: 153 m (502 ft)

Population (2020 census)
  - Prefecture-level city: 4,931,137
  - Density: 177.40/km^{2} (459.46/sq mi)
  - Urban: 1,725,865
  - Urban density: 626.9/km^{2} (1,624/sq mi)
  - Metro: 2,148,641
  - Metro density: 426.2/km^{2} (1,104/sq mi)

GDP
  - Prefecture-level city: CN¥ 231.1 billion US$ 35.8 billion
  - Per capita: CN¥ 46,767; US$ 7,249
- Time zone: UTC+8 (China Standard)
- Postal code: 541XXX
- Area code: 0773
- ISO 3166 code: CN-GX-03
- License plate prefixes: 桂C for Guilin's city proper, Yangshuo, and Lingui; all others 桂H
- Website: www.guilin.gov.cn

Guilin
- "Guìlín" in Chinese characters

Chinese name
- Chinese: 桂林
- Hanyu Pinyin: Guìlín
- Postal: Kweilin
- Literal meaning: "Cassia Forest", "Sweet Osmanthus Forest"
Transcriptions
Standard Mandarin
- Hanyu Pinyin: Guìlín
- Bopomofo: ㄍㄨㄟˋ ㄌㄧㄣˊ
- Gwoyeu Romatzyh: Gueylin
- Wade–Giles: Kuei^{4}-lin^{2}
- Yale Romanization: Gwèilín
- IPA: [kwêɪ.lǐn]
Hakka
- Romanization: Kui-lìm
Yue: Cantonese
- Yale Romanization: Gwailàhm
- Jyutping: Gwai3lam4
- IPA: [kʷɐj˧.lɐm˩]

Zhuang name
- Zhuang: Gveilinz
- 1957 orthography: Gveilinƨ

Guilin (Chinese: 桂林; Standard Zhuang: Gveilinz), formerly romanized as Kweilin, is a prefecture-level city in the northeast of China's Guangxi Zhuang Autonomous Region. It is situated on the west bank of the Li River and borders Hunan to the north. The city has long been renowned for its scenery of karst topography.

Guilin is one of China's most popular tourist destinations. A famous Chinese saying about the landscape of Guilin is "Guilin's scenery is the best in the world." (Chinese: 桂林山水甲天下) The State Council of China has designated Guilin a National Famous Historical and Cultural City, doing so in the first edition of the list.

== Name ==
The Qin dynasty established the Guilin Commandery in 214 BC after its conquest of South China. The name Guilin, meaning "Cassia Grove", was chosen for the commandery's association with exotic products from the southernmost reaches of the empire, such as the spice cassia (Cinnamomum cassia), which does not in fact grow in the Guilin area. The meaning of the Chinese word gui (桂) shifted during the Song dynasty, and now it primarily refers to the sweet osmanthus (Osmanthus fragrans), which is widely cultivated there. Today, the sweet osmanthus is the official city flower of Guilin.

== History ==
Before the Qin dynasty, the Guilin region was settled by the Baiyue people. In 314 BC, a small settlement was established along the banks of the Li River.

During the Qin dynasty's (221–206 BC) campaigns against the Baiyue peoples, the first administration was set up in the area around Guilin. The modern city was located within the Guilin Commandery, which is the origin of the modern name "Guilin".

In 111 BC, during the reign of Emperor Wu of the Han dynasty, Shi'an County (simplified Chinese: 始安县; traditional Chinese: 始安縣) was established, which could be regarded as the beginning of the city.

In AD 507, the town was renamed Guizhou (Gui Prefecture, 桂州).

In 634, Lingui County was established at the modern site of Guilin, under Gui Prefecture. In 868, Pang Xun rebelled against the Tang from Gui Prefecture.

Guilin prospered in the Tang and Song dynasties but remained a county. The city was also a nexus between the central government and the southwest border, and it was where regular armies were placed to guard that border. Canals were built through the city so that food supplies could be directly transported from the food-productive Yangtze plain to the farthest southwestern point of the empire.

In 997, the Guangnan West Circuit, the predecessor of modern Guangxi, was established, with Guizhou as the capital. In 1133, Guizhou was renamed Jingjiang Prefecture (simplified Chinese: 静江路; traditional Chinese: 靜江路). In 1367, the name was changed to Guilin Prefecture (桂林府).

In 1921, Guilin became one of the headquarters of the Northern Expeditionary Army led by Sun Yat-sen. In 1940, Guilin City was established. Guilin was the provincial capital of Guangxi before 1912 and from 1936 to 1949.

Guilin became one of the most important military, transport, and cultural centers of China during World War II. The city drastically expanded as refugees from all over China poured in, and by 1944 its population had grown from 70,000 pre-war to more than 500,000. It hosted intellectuals and artists including Guo Moruo, Mao Dun, Ba Jin, Tian Han, Xu Beihong, Feng Zikai and many others.

In 1950, the provincial capital of Guangxi was moved from Guilin to Nanning.

In 1981, Guilin was listed by the State Council as one of the four cities (the other three being Beijing, Hangzhou, and Suzhou) where the protection of historical and cultural heritage, as well as natural scenery, should be treated as a priority project.

== Administrative divisions ==
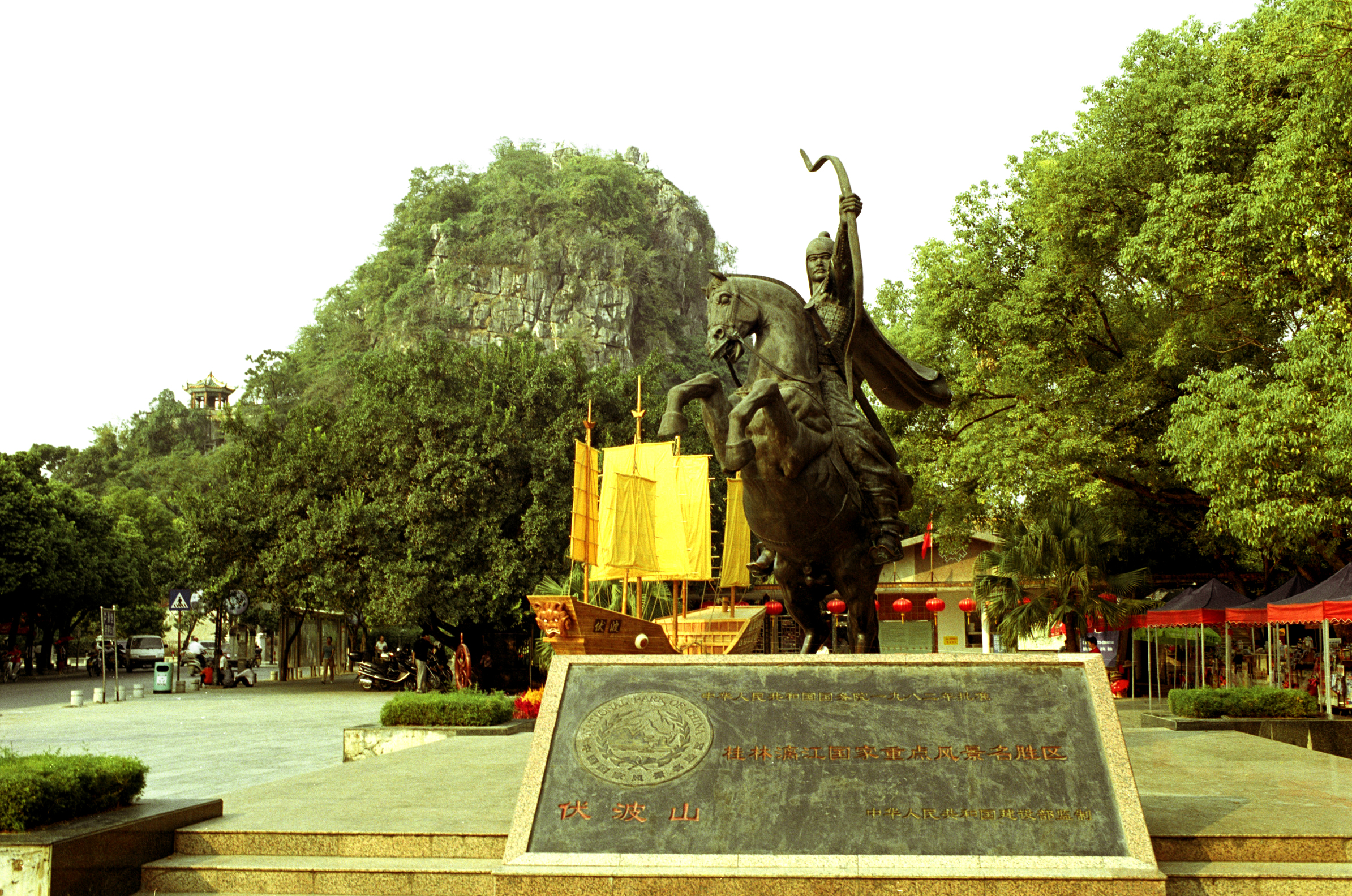
Statue of Ma Yuan at Fuboshan, Guilin.

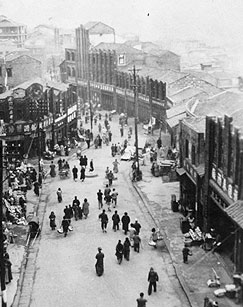
Streets of Guilin during World War II

Guilin administers seventeen county-level divisions, including 6 districts, 8 counties, 2 autonomous counties, and 1 county-level city.

- District:
  - Xiufeng District (秀峰区)
  - Xiangshan District (象山区)
  - Diecai District (叠彩区)
  - Qixing District (七星区)
  - Yanshan District (雁山区)
  - Lingui District (临桂区)
- County-level city:
  - Lipu city (荔浦市)
- County:
  - Yangshuo County (阳朔县)
  - Lingchuan County (灵川县)
  - Xing'an County (兴安县)
  - Quanzhou County (全州县)
  - Yongfu County (永福县)
  - Ziyuan County (资源县)
  - Guanyang County (灌阳县)
  - Pingle County (平乐县)
- Autonomous county:
  - Gongcheng Yao Autonomous County (恭城瑶族自治县)
  - Longsheng Various Nationalities Autonomous County (龙胜各族自治县)

Map
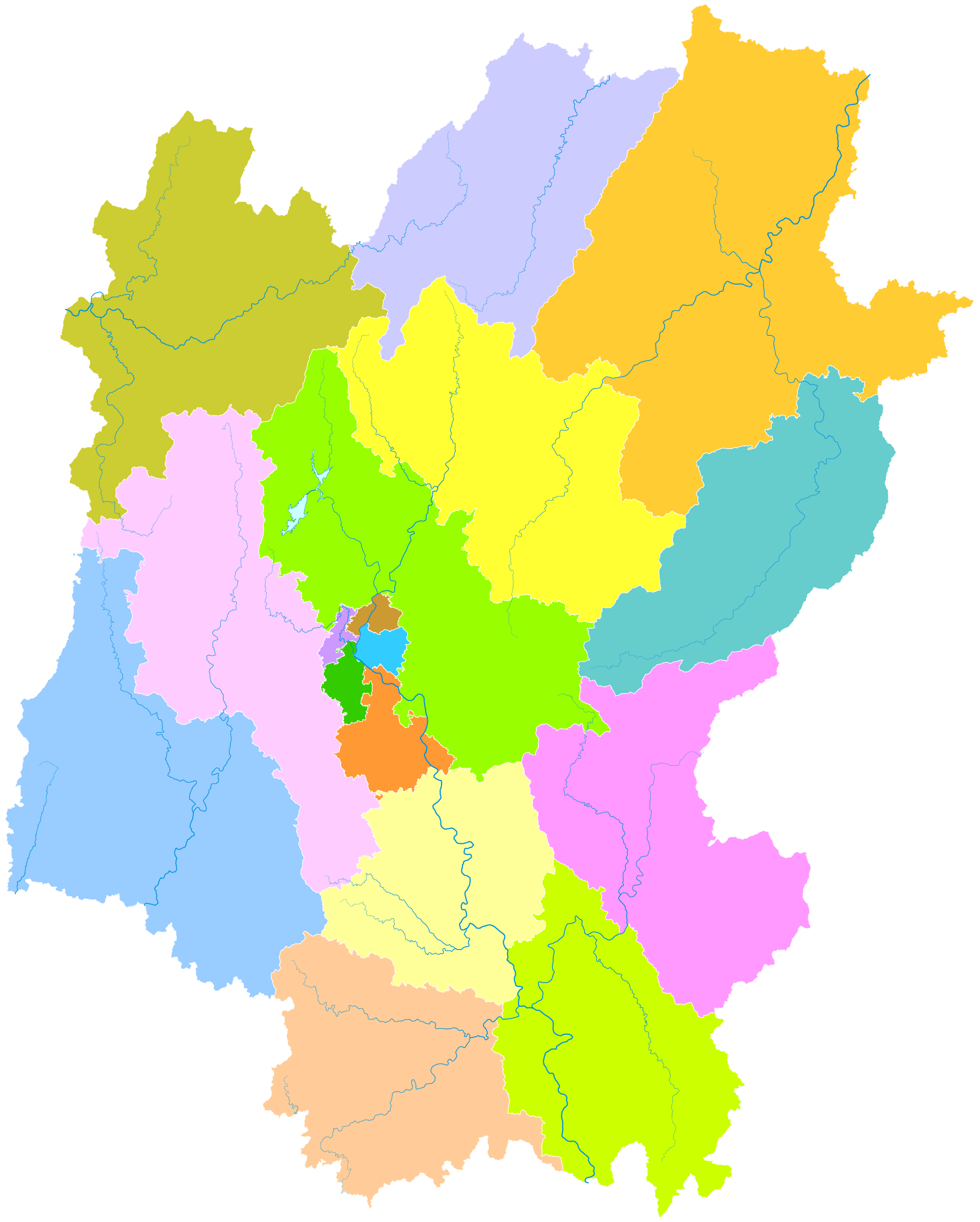

== Geography ==
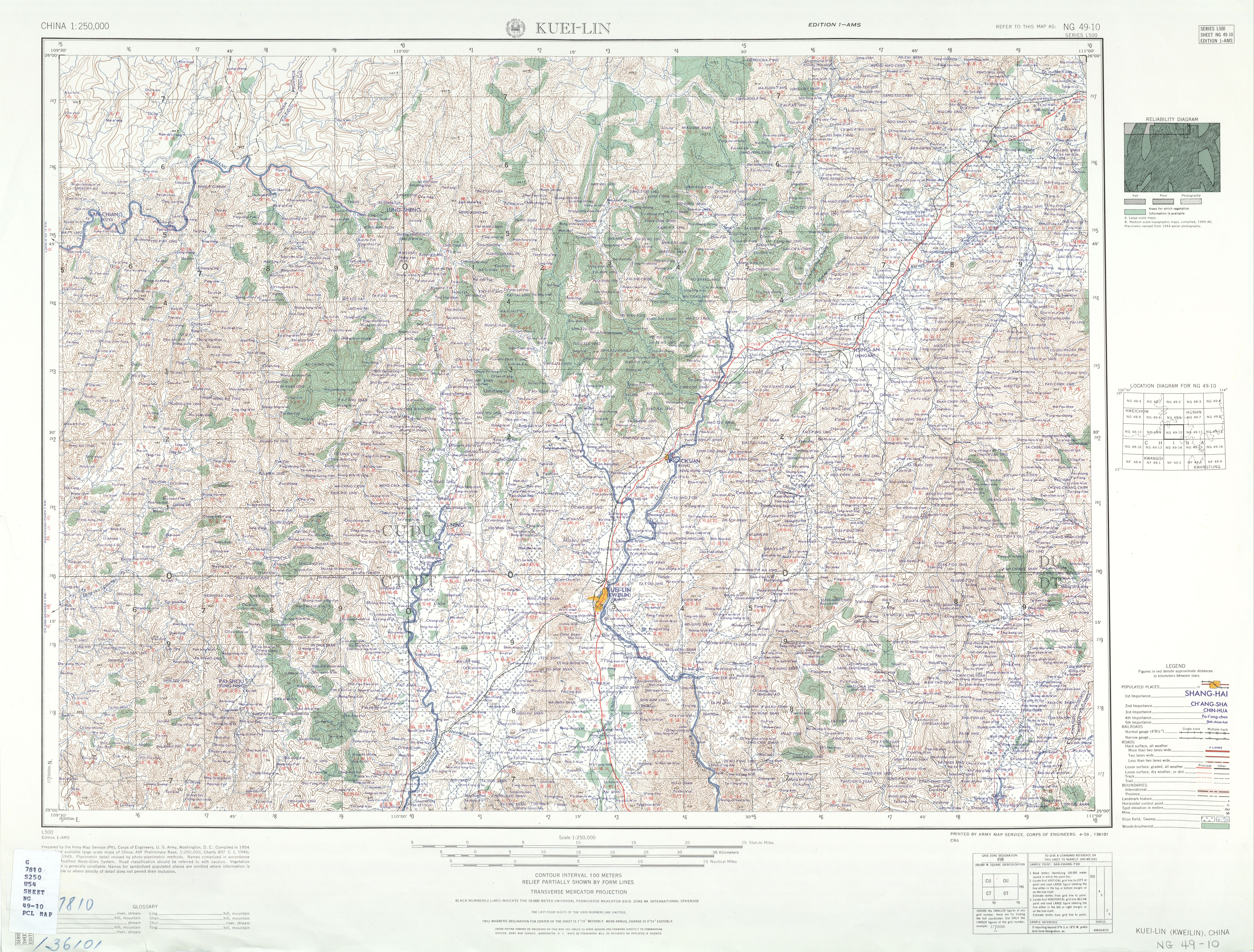
Map including Guilin (labeled as 桂林 KUEI-LIN (KWEILIN) (Walled)) (AMS, 1954)

Guilin is located in northern Guangxi, bordering Liuzhou to the west, Laibin to the southwest, Wuzhou to the south, Hezhou to the southeast, and within neighbouring Hunan, Huaihua to the northwest, Shaoyang to the north, and Yongzhou to the east. It has a total area of 27,809 square kilometres (10,737 sq mi). The topography of the area is marked by karst formations. The karsts surrounding Guilin are made of Triassic period limestone and dolomite rocks. The Li River, running 83 km from Guilin to Yangshuo, is one of the city’s most celebrated natural features. Known for its emerald water and limestone peaks, the river section is a highly concentrated example of karst terrain.

- Hills and mountains: Diecai Hill (叠彩山), Elephant Trunk Hill, Wave-Subduing Hill (伏波山), Lipu Mountains, Kitten Mountain, the highest peak of Guangxi, and Yao Hill (尧山)
- Caves: Reed Flute Cave, Seven-star Cave

=== Climate ===
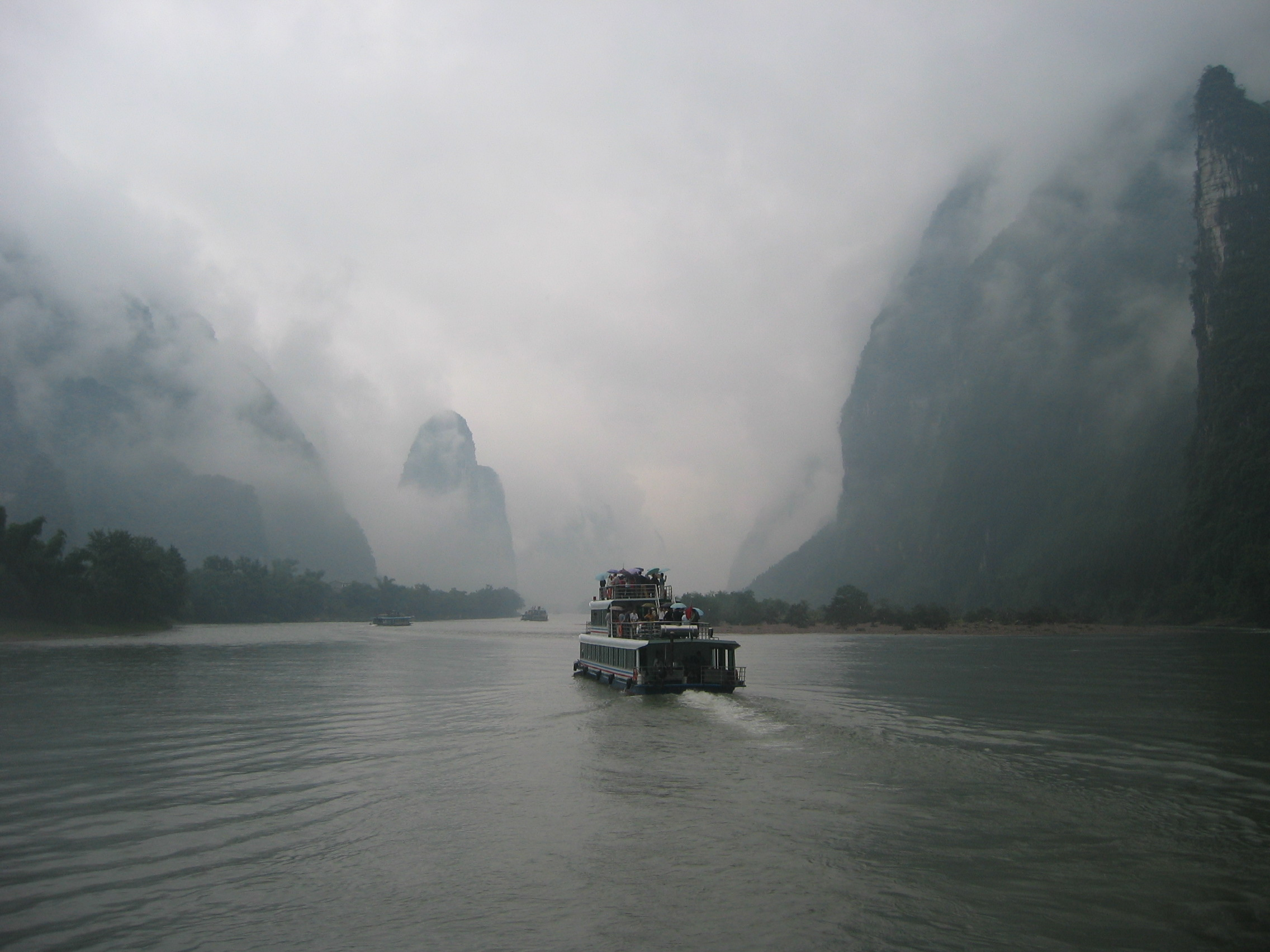
Fog on the Li River

Guilin has a monsoon-influenced humid subtropical climate (Köppen Cfa, bordering on Cwa), with short, mild winters, and long, hot, humid summers. Winter begins dry but becomes progressively wetter and cloudier. Spring is generally overcast and often rainy, while summer continues to be rainy, though it is the sunniest time of year. Autumn is sunny and dry. The monthly 24-hour average temperature ranges from 8.1 °C (46.6 °F) in January to 28.2 °C (82.8 °F) in July, and the annual mean is 19.12 °C (66.4 °F). The annual rainfall is just under 1,890 mm (74 in) and is delivered in bulk (~50%) from April to June, when the plum rains occur and often create the risk of flooding. With monthly percent possible sunshine ranging from 14% in March to 53% in September, the city receives 1,487 hours of bright sunshine annually. Extremes since 1951 have ranged from −4.9 °C (23 °F) (though an unofficial record low of −5.0 °C (23 °F) was recorded on 25 January 1940) to 40.3 °C (105 °F).

Climate data for Guilin, elevation 164 m (538 ft), (1991–2020 normals, extremes 1951–present)
Month	Jan	Feb	Mar	Apr	May	Jun	Jul	Aug	Sep	Oct	Nov	Dec	Year
Record high °C (°F)	27.6 (81.7)	32.8 (91.0)	33.7 (92.7)	35.6 (96.1)	36.6 (97.9)	37.4 (99.3)	40.3 (104.5)	39.4 (102.9)	38.5 (101.3)	35.6 (96.1)	32.6 (90.7)	27.6 (81.7)	40.3 (104.5)
Mean daily maximum °C (°F)	11.7 (53.1)	14.2 (57.6)	17.5 (63.5)	23.7 (74.7)	27.9 (82.2)	30.5 (86.9)	32.8 (91.0)	33.2 (91.8)	30.8 (87.4)	26.3 (79.3)	20.8 (69.4)	14.9 (58.8)	23.7 (74.6)
Daily mean °C (°F)	8.4 (47.1)	10.6 (51.1)	13.9 (57.0)	19.6 (67.3)	23.7 (74.7)	26.6 (79.9)	28.4 (83.1)	28.4 (83.1)	26.0 (78.8)	21.5 (70.7)	16.2 (61.2)	10.8 (51.4)	19.5 (67.1)
Mean daily minimum °C (°F)	6.1 (43.0)	8.3 (46.9)	11.4 (52.5)	16.6 (61.9)	20.7 (69.3)	23.8 (74.8)	25.2 (77.4)	25.0 (77.0)	22.6 (72.7)	18.3 (64.9)	13.1 (55.6)	8.0 (46.4)	16.6 (61.9)
Record low °C (°F)	−4.9 (23.2)	−3.6 (25.5)	0.0 (32.0)	4.0 (39.2)	10.7 (51.3)	13.0 (55.4)	18.2 (64.8)	18.3 (64.9)	12.9 (55.2)	6.1 (43.0)	0.7 (33.3)	−3.3 (26.1)	−4.9 (23.2)
Average precipitation mm (inches)	68.9 (2.71)	83.9 (3.30)	153.0 (6.02)	226.7 (8.93)	321.1 (12.64)	448.7 (17.67)	266.3 (10.48)	147.6 (5.81)	80.9 (3.19)	54.9 (2.16)	81.9 (3.22)	54.1 (2.13)	1,988 (78.26)
Average precipitation days (≥ 0.1 mm)	13.5	13.6	19.3	18.5	18.2	18.5	16.1	12.5	7.9	7.1	9.2	10.1	164.5
Average snowy days	1.1	0.4	0	0	0	0	0	0	0	0	0	0.5	2
Average relative humidity (%)	71	73	78	78	78	81	77	75	70	66	67	65	73
Mean monthly sunshine hours	58.4	52.2	55.0	78.7	113.1	113.3	180.6	197.2	180.3	157.1	122.9	102.1	1,410.9
Percentage possible sunshine	18	16	15	21	27	28	43	49	49	44	38	31	32
Source: China Meteorological Administration all-time extreme temperature

== Demographics ==
According to the 2020 Chinese census, its population was 4,931,137 inhabitants, and 2,148,641 lived in the built-up (or metro) area made of 6 urban Districts plus Lingchuan County now being conurbated. According to the 2010 Chinese census, the largest ethnic group in the prefecture-level city was Han Chinese, accounting for 84.53% of the total population. This was followed by Yao at 7.79% and Zhuang at 4.81%. Citizens of Guilin's urban area speak a dialect of Mandarin, while Pinghua is predominantly spoken in suburbs and surrounding areas. By the end of 2024, the city's resident population will be 4,950,700.

== Economy ==
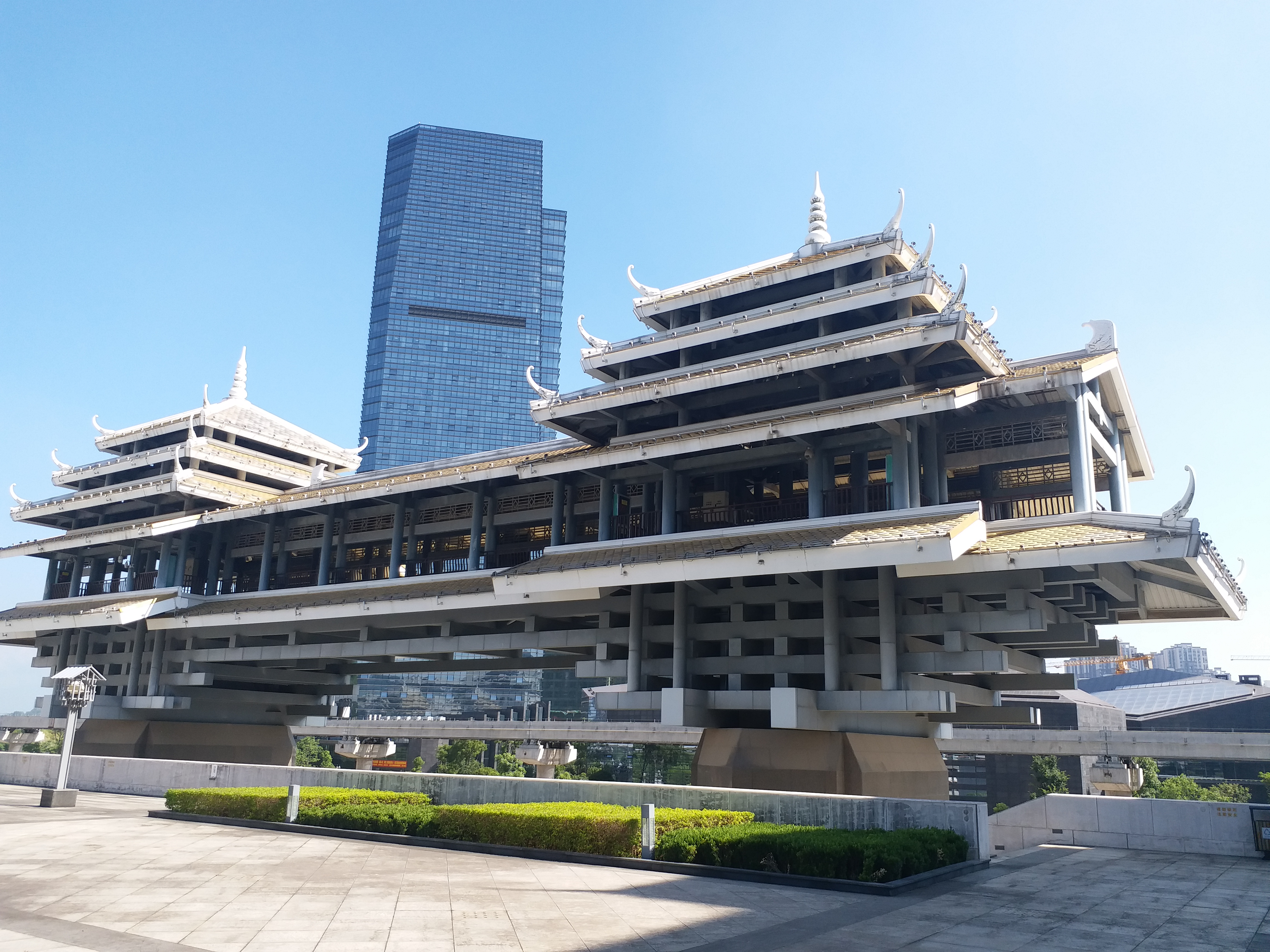
Guilin Museum and Library

- The GDP per capita was ¥41891 (ca. US$6569) in 2020, ranked no. 134 among 659 Chinese cities.
- Local industries: condoms, pharmaceutical goods, tires, machinery, fertilizer, silk, perfume, wine, tea, cinnamon, herbal medicine
- Local agricultural products: Shatian Pomelo, summer orange, Fructus Momordicae, ginkgo, moon persimmon, Lipu Taro, Sanhua Alcohol, pepper sauce, fermented bean curd, Guilin Rice Noodle, water chestnut, grain, fish and dried bean milk cream in tight rolls

Until 1949, only a thermal power plant, a cement works, and some small textile mills existed as signs of industrialization in Guilin. However, since the 1950s Guilin has added electronics, engineering, and agricultural equipment, medicine, rubber, buses, textile, and cotton yarn factories. Food processing, including the processing of local agricultural produce, remains the most important industry. More recent and modern industry features high technology, and the tertiary industry is characterized by tourism, trading, and service.

Citizens of ASEAN states do not need a visa to visit Guilin if part of a tour lasting a maximum of 144 hours (not including the day of arrival).

== Transportation ==
=== Air ===
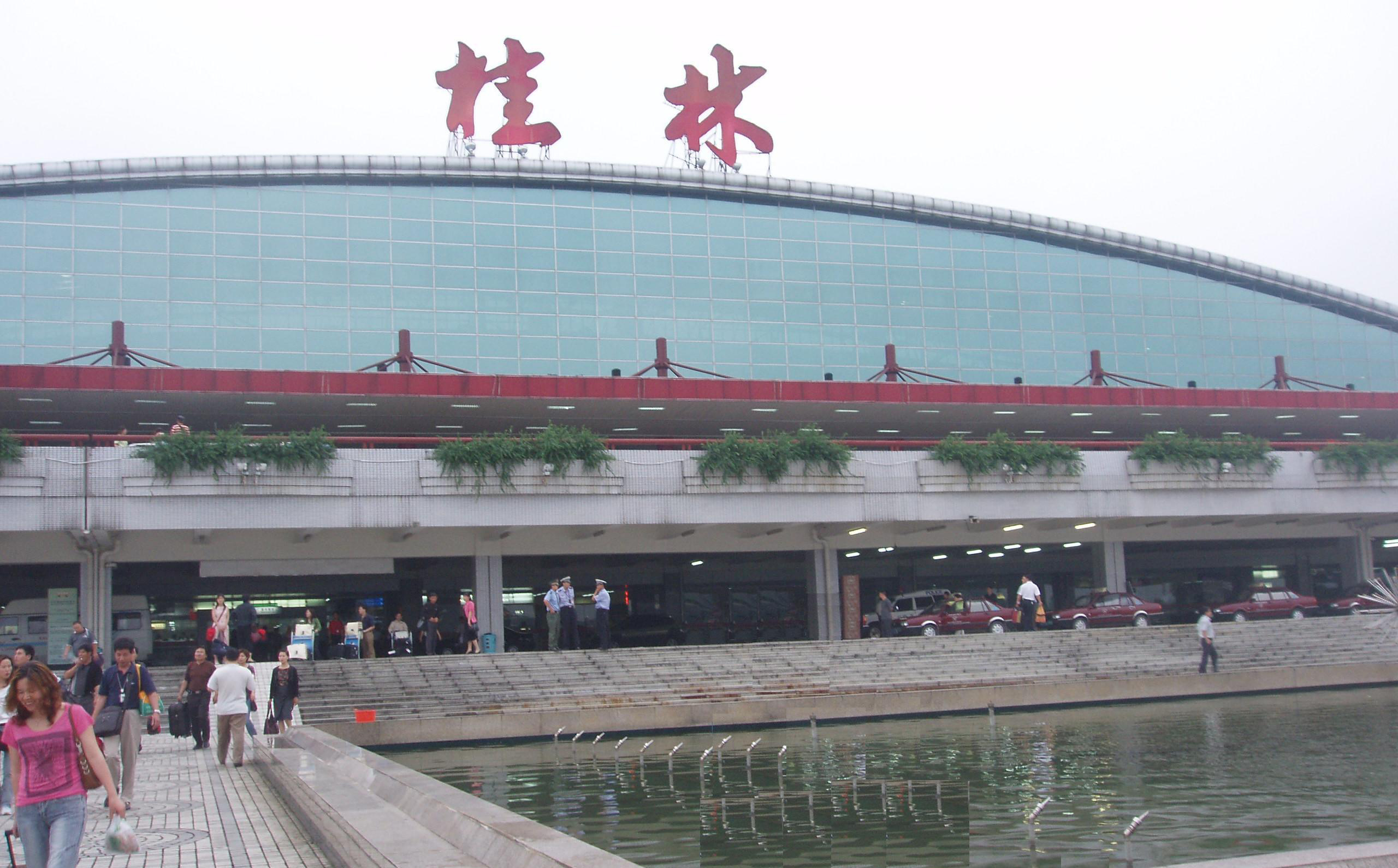
Guilin Liangjiang International Airport

The airport is Guilin Liangjiang International Airport (ICAO:ZGKL, IATA:KWL). Airlines that fly to the airport are:

- China Eastern
- Asiana Airlines
- China Southern
- Air China
- Hainan Airlines
- Shanghai Airlines
- Shandong Airlines
- Xiamen Airlines
- Tianjin Airlines
- EVA Air
- Air Asia
- Beijing Capital Airlines
- Hebei Airlines

=== Rail ===
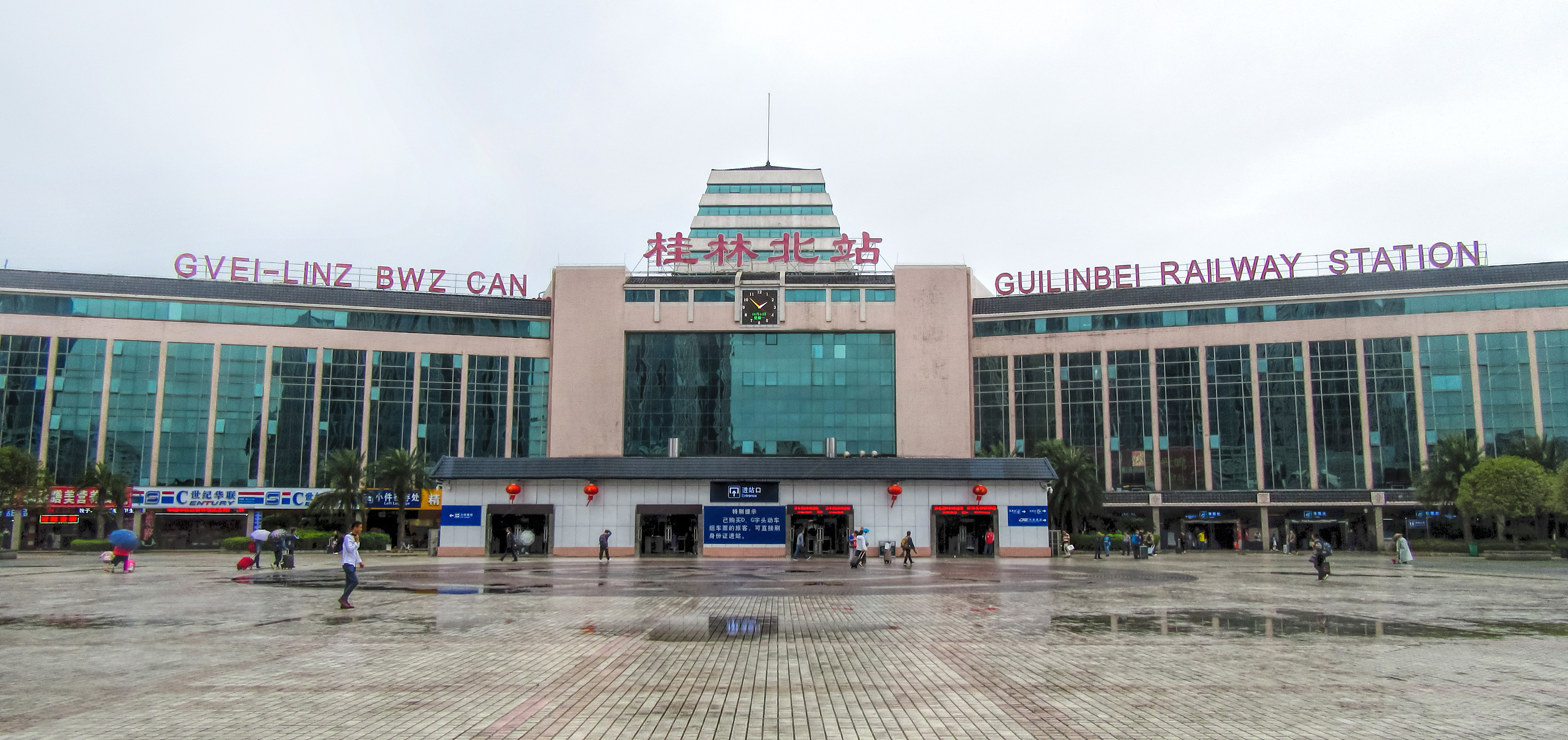
Guilin North railway station

Guilin has several high-speed rail stations, Guilin North, Guilin West, Guilin, and a new station in the Lingui District. Guilin station and Guilin North station are on the Hunan–Guangxi railway, Hengyang–Liuzhou intercity railway, and Guiyang–Guangzhou high-speed railway, the main railways connecting Guangxi with central and southern China. Arriving at North Station, high-speed trains between Guilin and Changsha and Beijing came into operation in December 2013. In December 2014, high-speed operations began connecting Guangzhou, Shenzhen, Guiyang, and Shanghai. This made it more convenient for people to come to Guilin. It takes only about 2 or 3 hours from Guangzhou to Guilin, 9 hours from Shanghai to Guilin, and 13 hours from Beijing to Guilin. Trains traveling between Kunming South and West Kowloon stations (for example) stop at Guilin West railway station.

=== Urban ===
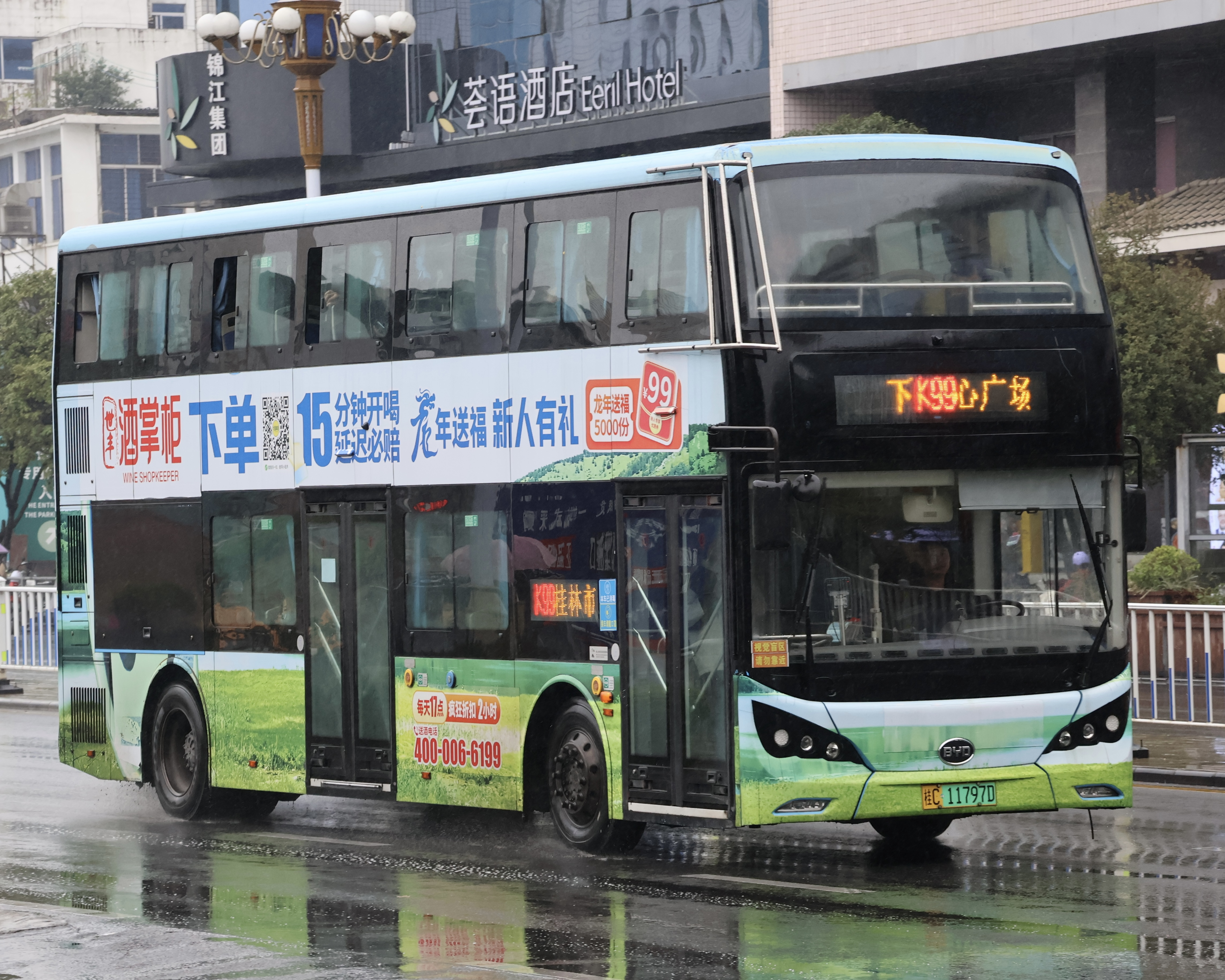
A BYD K8S double decker bus operating in Guilin

The city's public transportation includes bus routes and taxis. Guilin is the leading city in Mainland China operating double-decker buses regularly on major routes; on its main street, the double-deckers run one by one almost every minute. Sightseeing boats also run on the city's canals and lakes.

A Guilin Metro is planned for 7 lines by 2040 with 117 stations and a total length of 273.2 kilometres. Line 1 is planned to be opened by 2025, and it will be 29.23 km with 13 stations.

== Public colleges and universities ==
- Guilin University of Technology
- Guilin Medical University
- Guilin University of Electronic Technology
- Guangxi Normal University
- Guilin University of Aerospace Technology
- Guilin College

Note: Institutions without full-time bachelor programs are not listed.

== Scenic spots ==
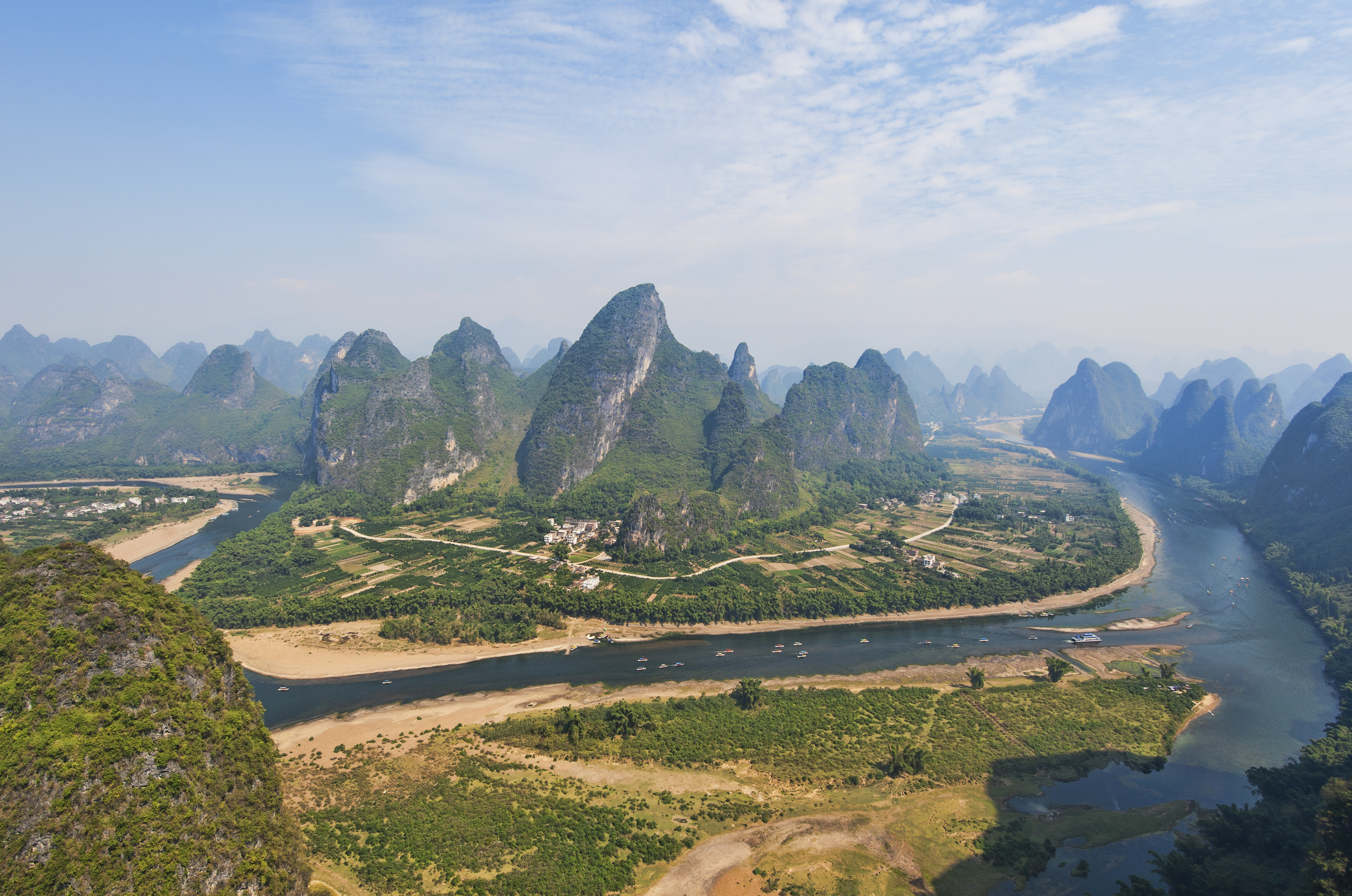
The Li River connects Guilin and Yangshuo County

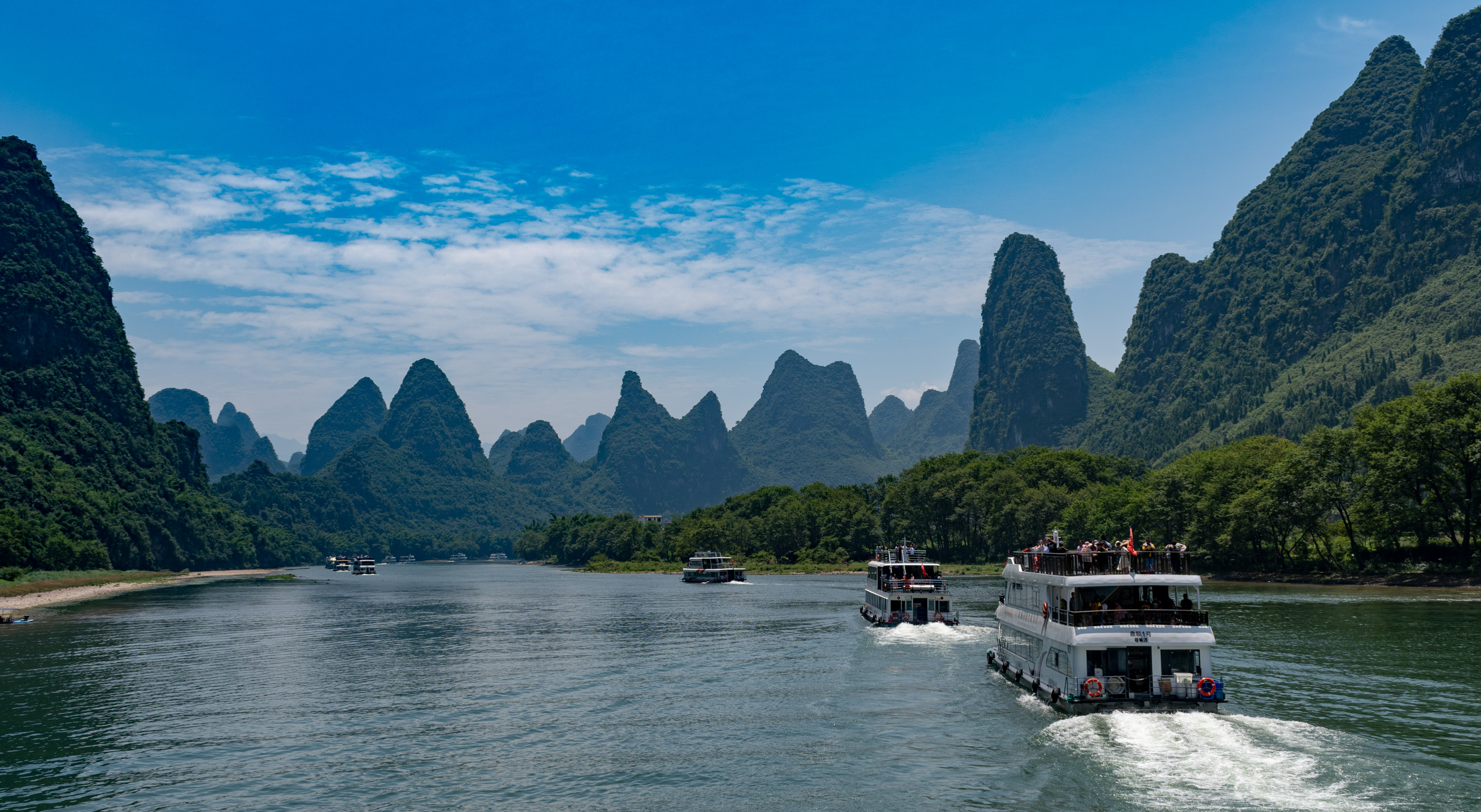
Ship tour on Li River

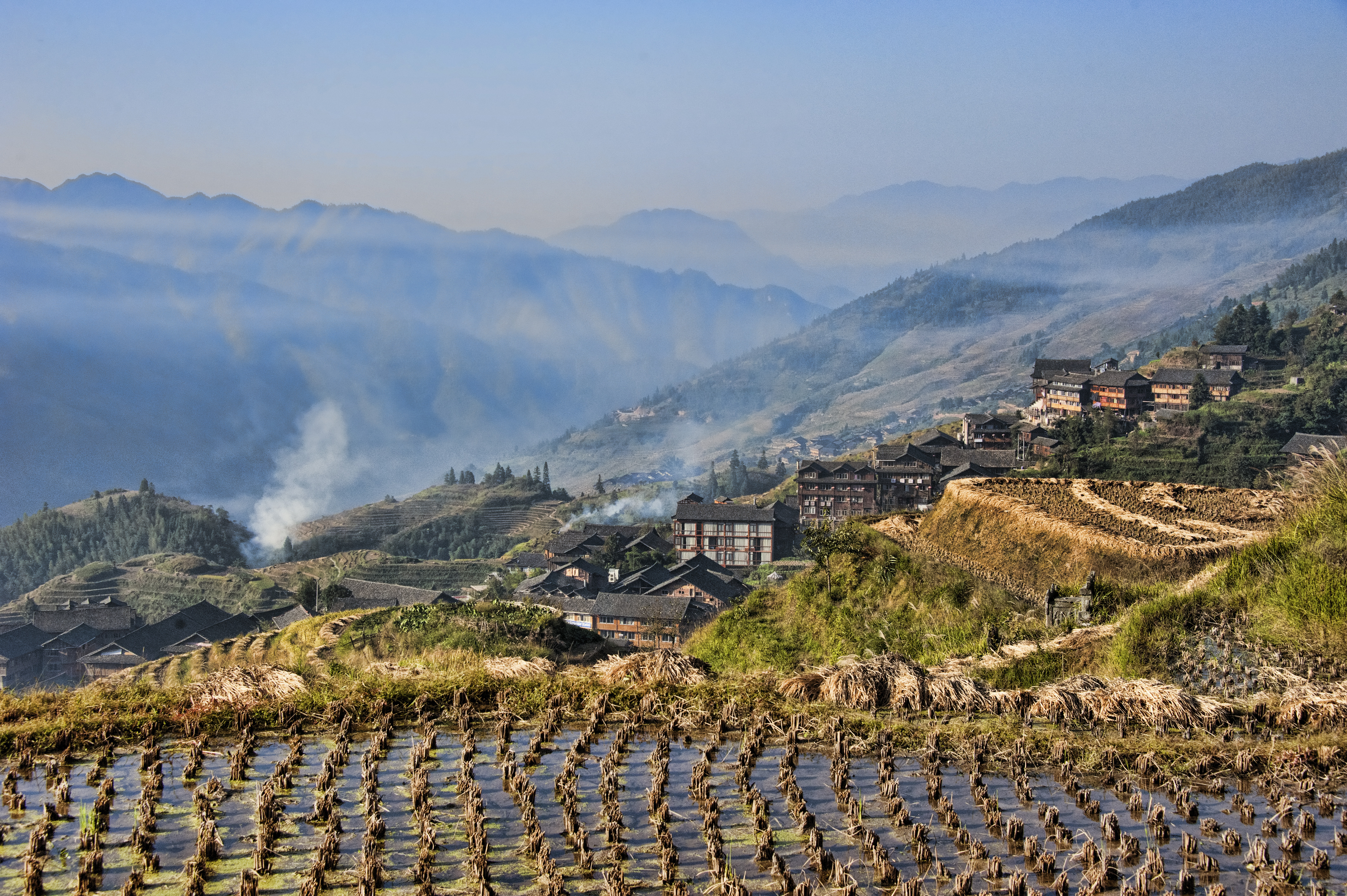
Longsheng Rice Terrace (Ping An)

Cuiping Village

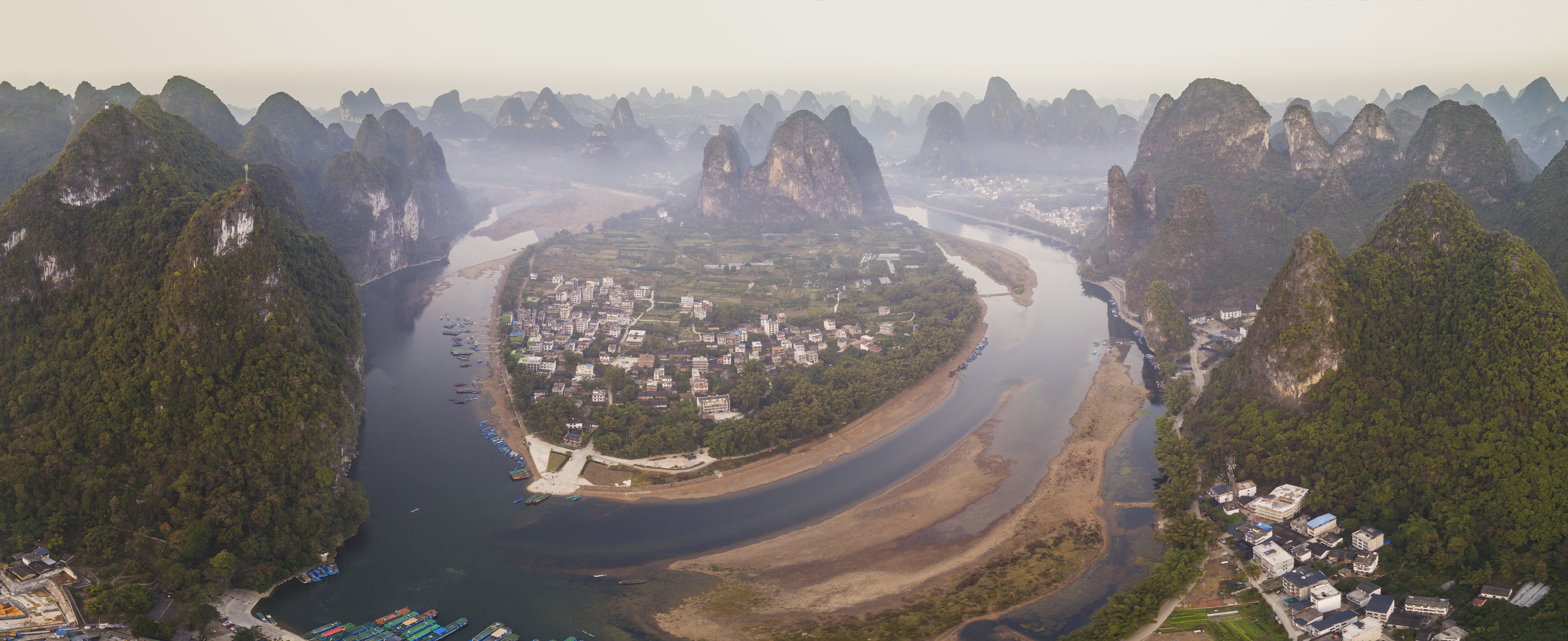
Xingping Village

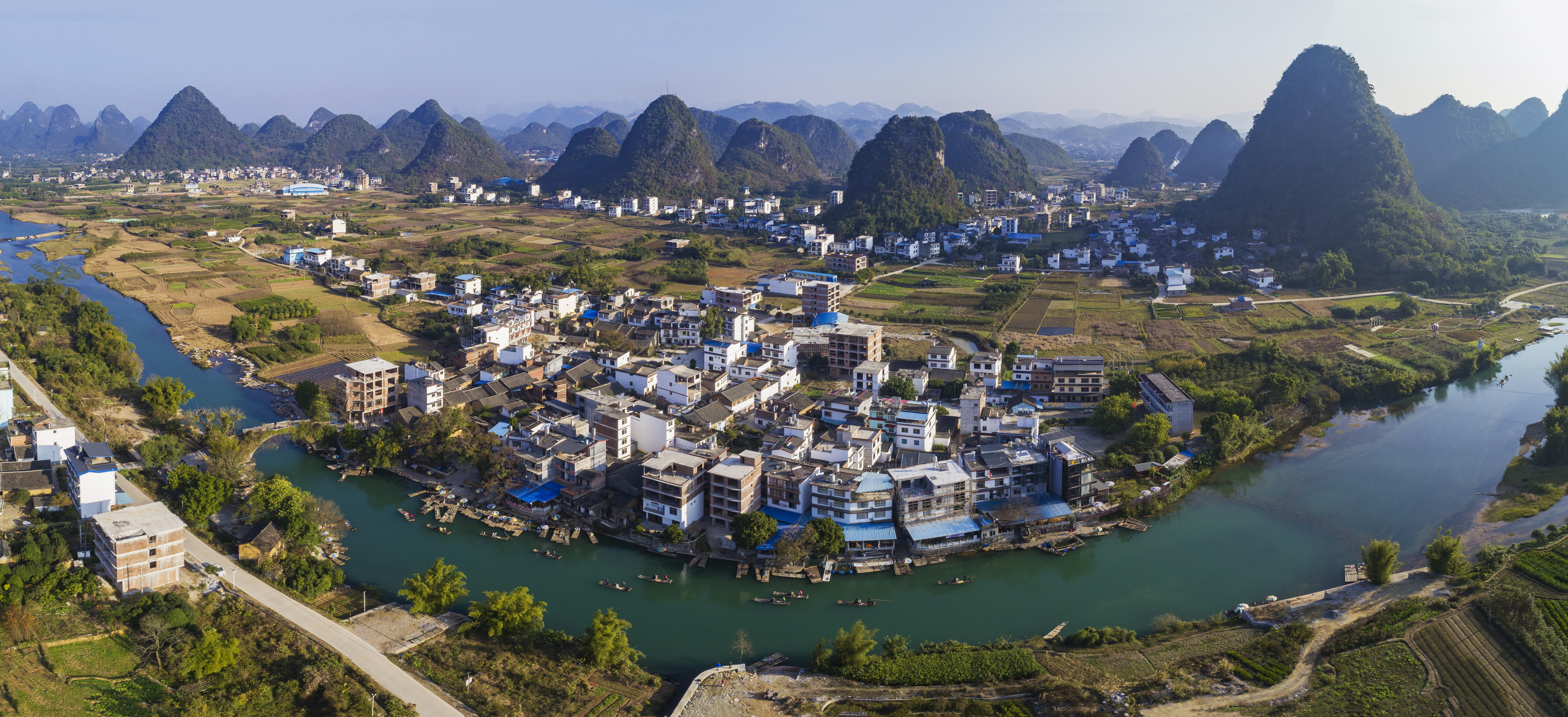
Rafts sailing down the Yulong River in Yangshuo, a county of Guilin

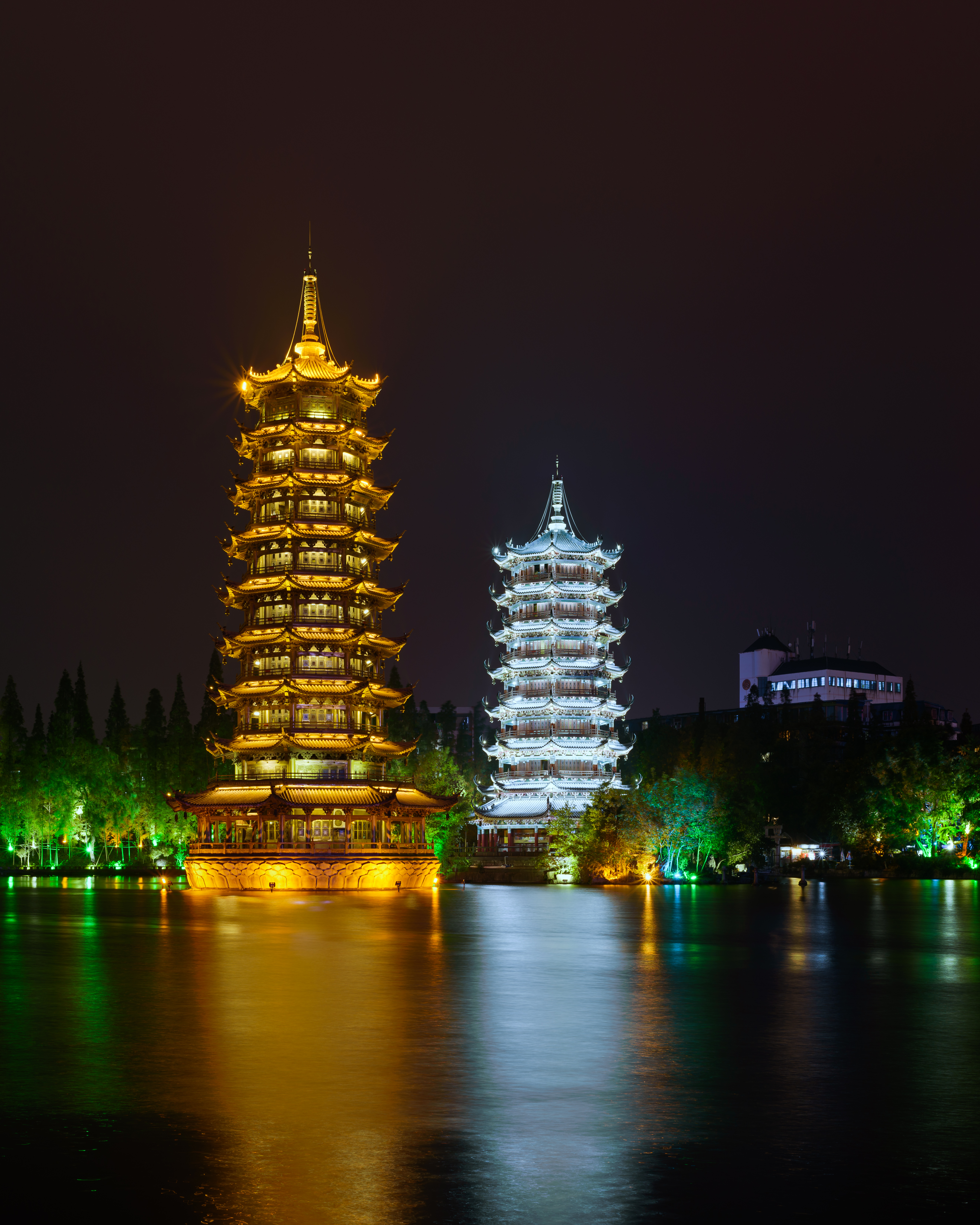
Sun and Moon Pagodas in Shan Lake

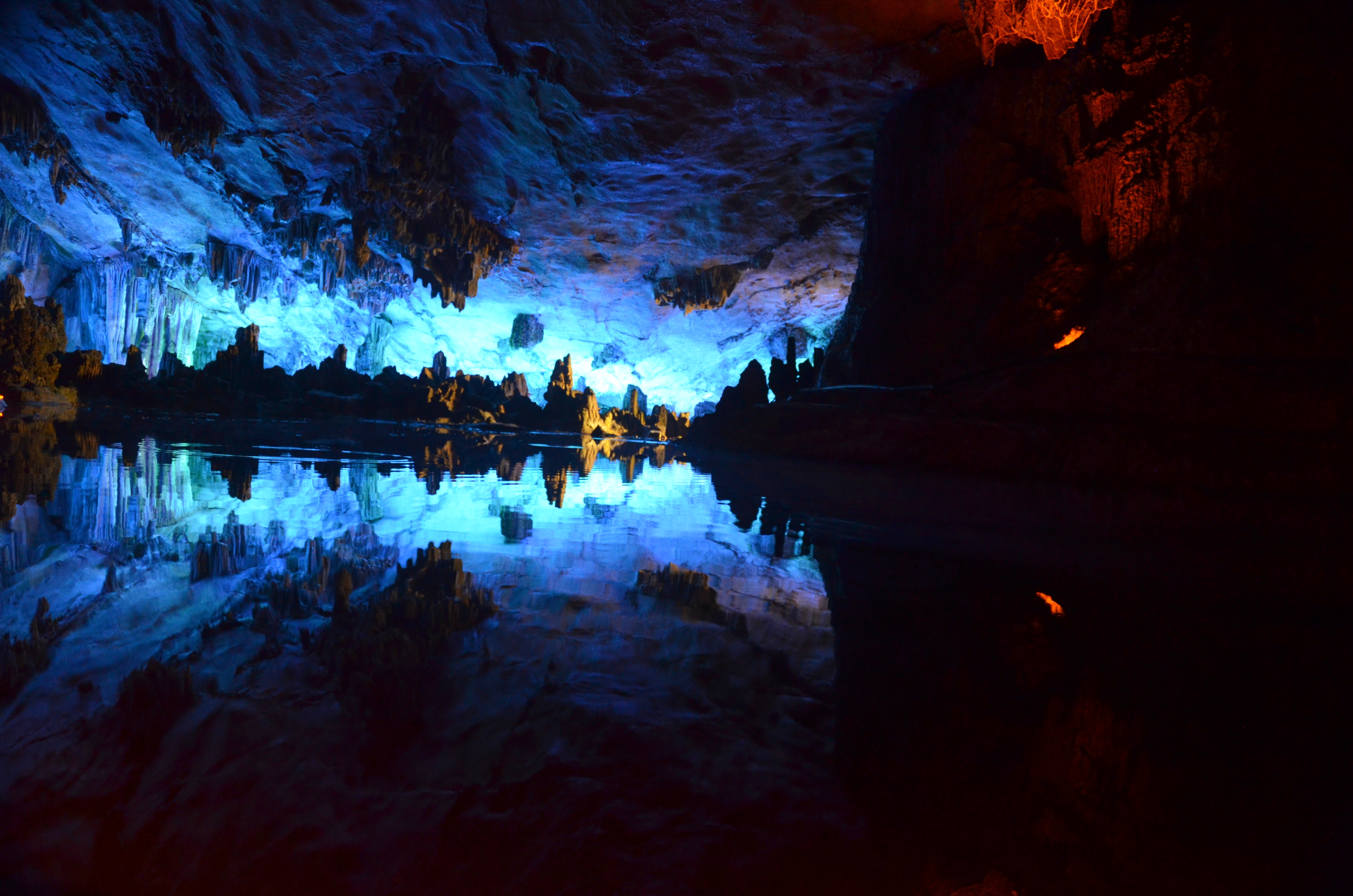
Reed Flute Cave

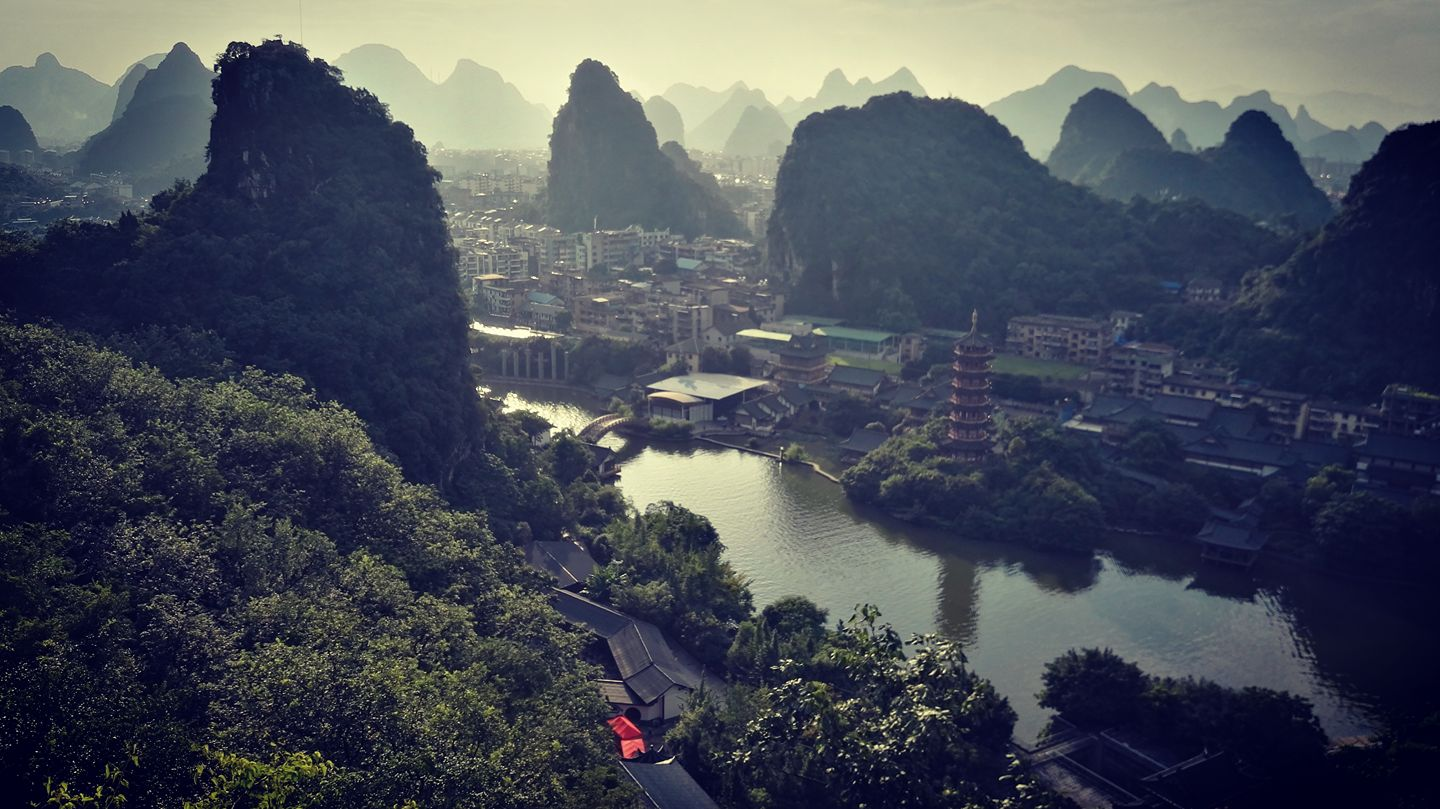
Scenic view of the town from Seven-star Park

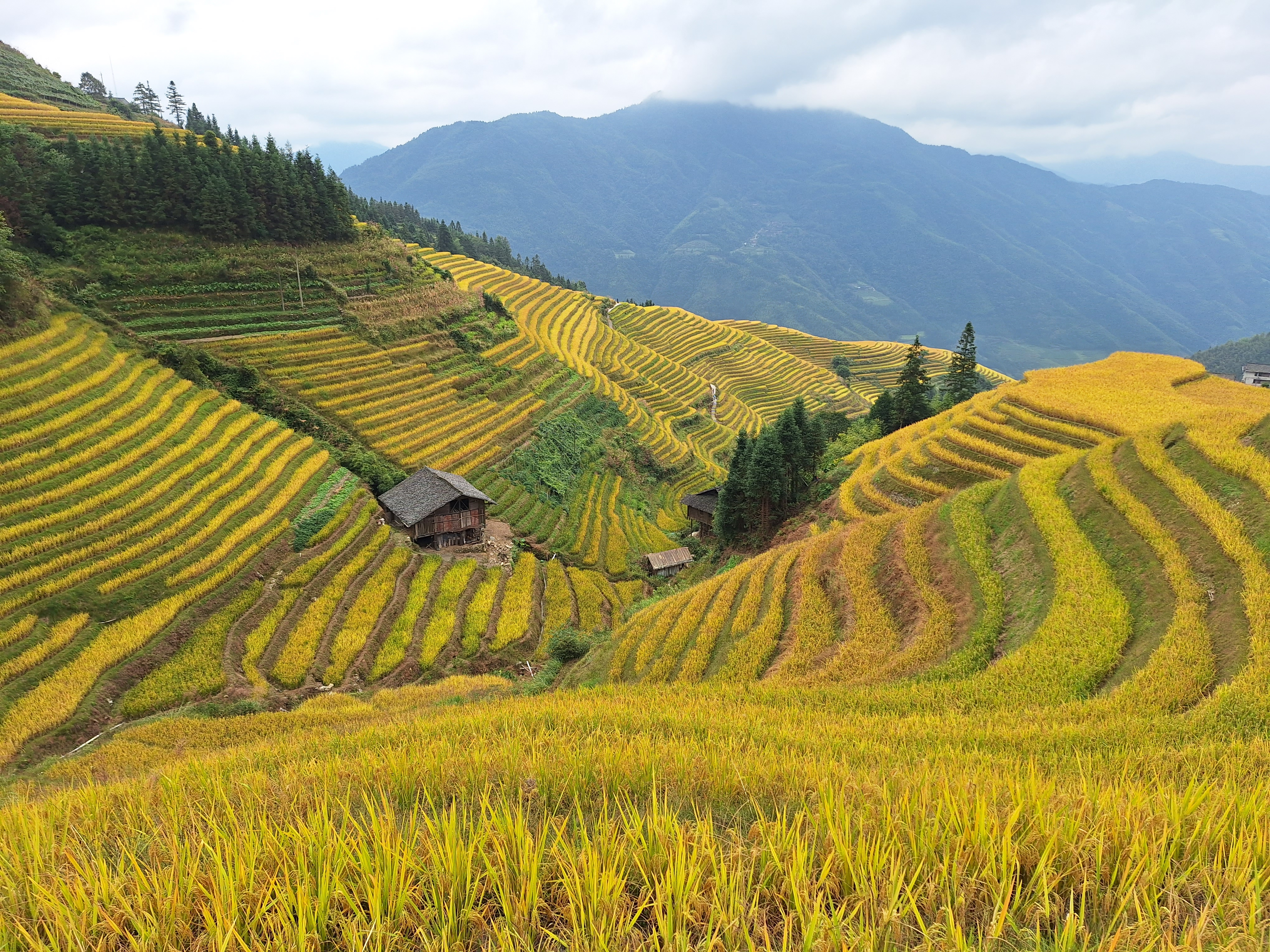
Longji rice terraces

Scenic spots around Guilin include:

- Jingjiang Princes City, a royal complex dating from the Ming dynasty that lies near the center of modern Guilin
- Reed Flute Cave
- Silver Cave
- Li River
- Yangshuo
- Seven-Star Cave and Seven Star Park (七星公园)
- Camel Mountain (骆驼山) and Elephant Trunk Hill
- Piled Festoon Hill (堆花彩山)
- Crescent Hill (月牙山)
- Fubo Hill (伏波山)
- Nanxi Hill (南溪山)
- Erlang Gorge (二郎山峡谷)
- Huangbu (Yellow Cloth) Beach (黄埔滩)
- Moon Hill
- Longsheng Rice Terrace
- Daxu Ancient Town (大圩古市镇)
- Xingping Ancient Town (兴坪古镇)
- Duxiu, Solitary Beauty Peak (独秀峰)
- Liusanjie Landscape Garden (刘三姐景观园)
- Yao Hill (尧山)
- Sun and Moon Pagodas (日月双塔) In Guilin city, the Sun and Moon Pagodas (日月双塔) on Shanhu Lake and the iconic Elephant Trunk Hill (象鼻山) are major landmarks.

== Cuisine ==
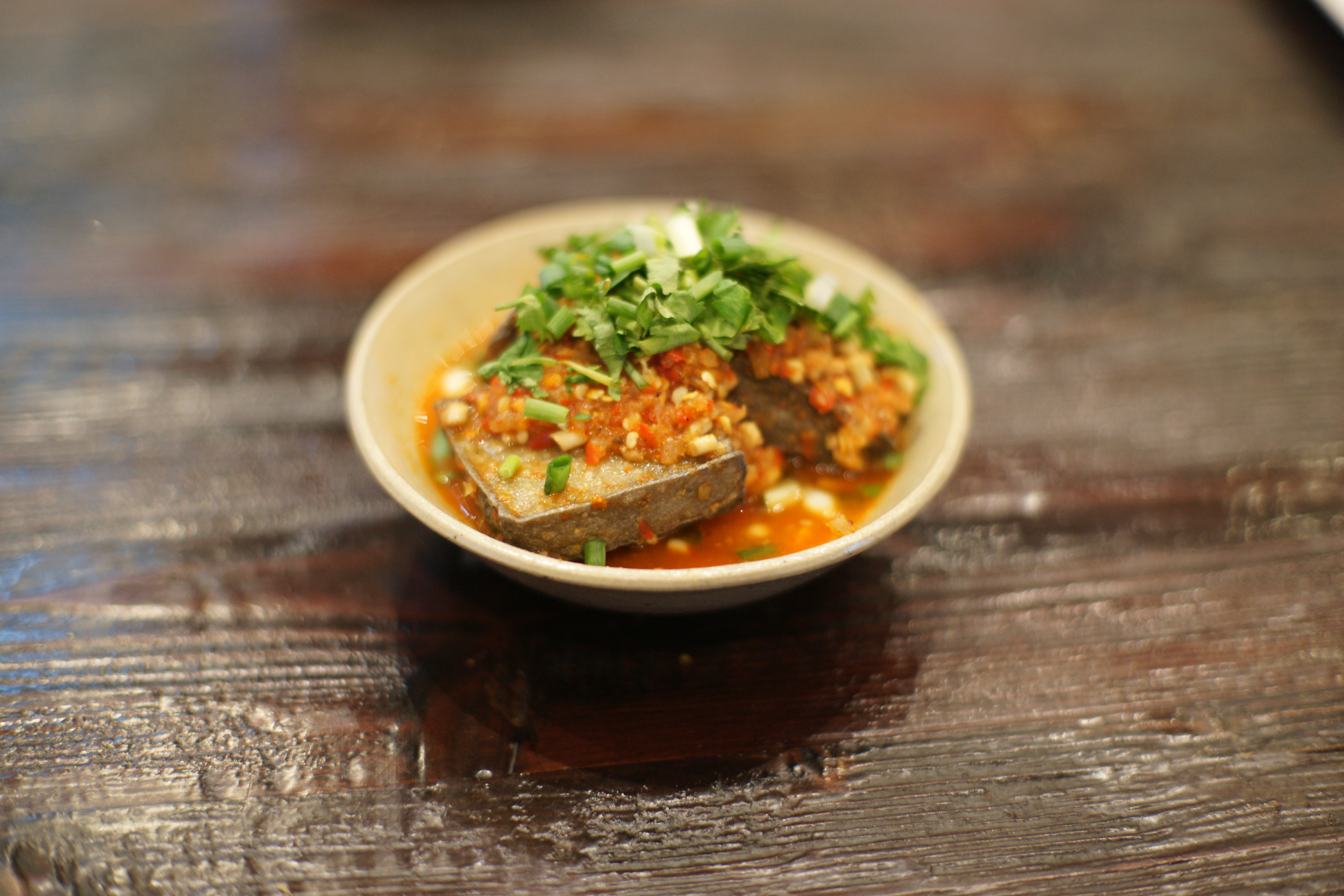
Guilin pickled tofu

Guilin cuisine is a mixture of Cantonese cuisine and Zhuang cuisine. It is known for its snacks and the use of spices, especially chili. Guilin chili sauce (桂林辣椒酱), used widely in cooking by locals, is made of fresh chili, garlic, and fermented soybeans, and is considered one of the city's Three Treasures (桂林三宝). The other two of the Three Treasures are Guilin Sanhua Jiu (桂林三花酒), a variety of rice baijiu, or liquor distilled from rice; and Guilin pickled tofu.

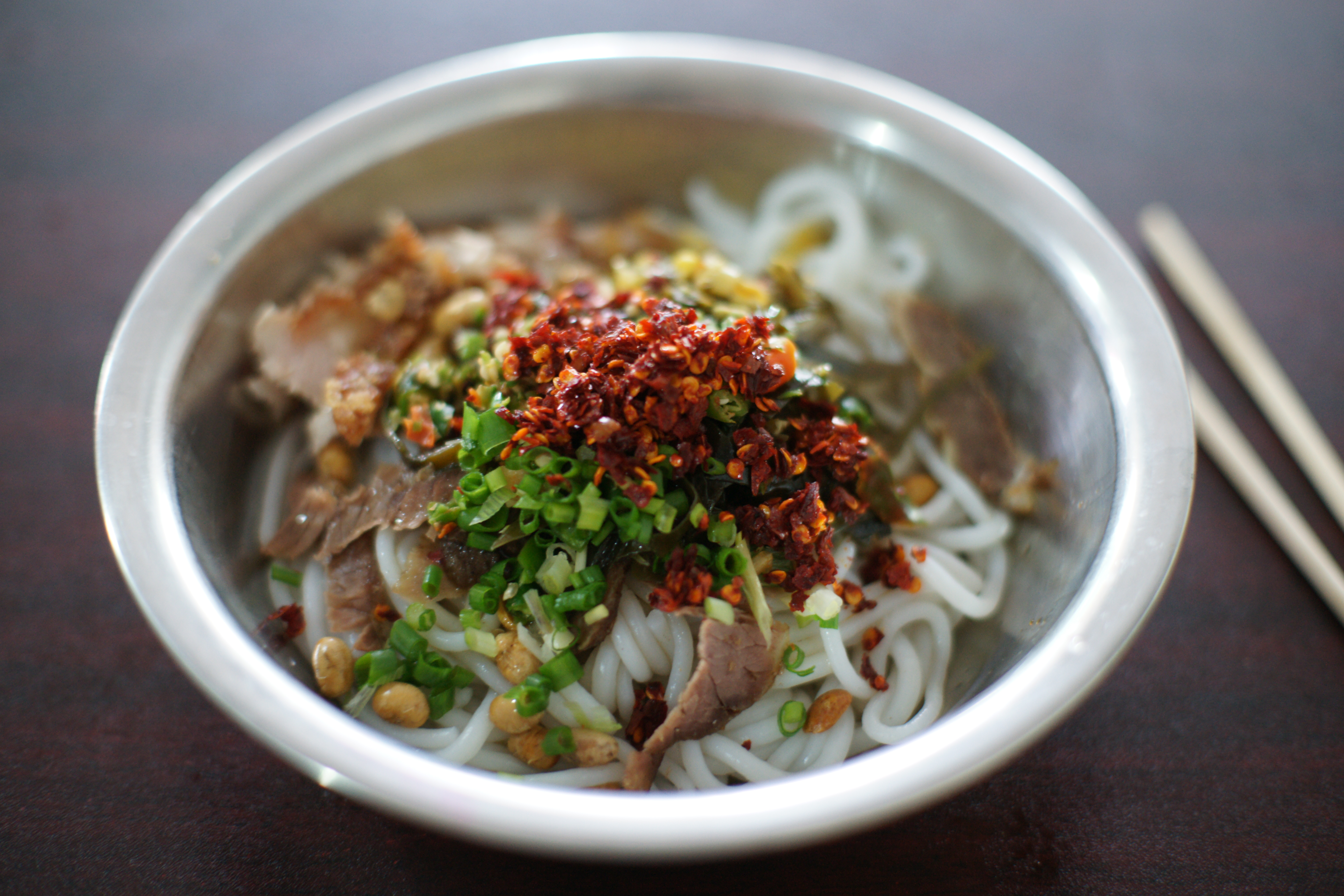
Guilin rice noodles

Guilin rice noodles have been the local breakfast staple since the Qin dynasty and are renowned for their delicate taste. Legend has it that when Qin troops suffering from diarrhea entered this region, a cook created the Guilin rice noodles for the army because they had trouble eating the local food. Specifically, the local specialty is noodles with horse meat, but this dish can also be ordered without the horse meat. Zongzi, a dumpling made from glutinous rice and mung bean paste wrapped in a bamboo or banana leaf, is another popular delicacy in Guilin.

== Quotes ==
=== "Guilin's scenery is the best in the world" ===
The popular Chinese epithet "Guilin's scenery is the best in the world" (Chinese: 桂林山水甲天下; pinyin: Guìlín shānshuǐ jiǎ tiānxià) originates from the Song Dynasty poet Fan Chengda. It is a reference to its beautiful and unique karst topography. Some common alternate translations include, "East or west, Guilin landscape is best", "By water, by mountains, most lovely, Guilin", and "The scenery of Guilin is world-renowned."

=== Other ===
"I often sent pictures of the hills of Guilin, which I painted to friends back home, but few believed what they saw."

- Fan Chengda (Chinese Song dynasty scholar)

== Twin towns—Sister cities ==
Guilin is twinned with:

- – Nishikatsura, Yamanashi, Japan – Lingchuan County
- – Kumamoto City, Japan – Guilin
- – Toride City, Japan – Guilin
- – Miho, Ibaraki, Japan – Lingui
- – Jeju, South Korea
- – Hastings, New Zealand
- – Toruń, Poland
- – Orlando, United States
- – Tlaxcoapan, Hidalgo, Mexico
- – Langkawi, Malaysia

The Guilin relationship with the New Zealand city Hastings started in 1977, after a research scientist, Stuart Falconer, identified several common areas of interest between the two cities, including horticulture and their rural-urban mix. In 1997 Guilin commenced an exchange relationship with Ōta, Gunma, Japan.

== In popular culture ==
Guilin was used as a second unit filming location for the 2005 film Star Wars: Episode III - Revenge of the Sith, serving as the basis for the exterior landscape shots of the planet Kashyyyk, alongside the shots used in Phuket, Thailand.

== Notable people ==
- Bai Chongxi, general and politician
- Jiang Zhenbang, badminton player
- Li Zongren, general and warlord, vice-president and acting president of the Republic of China
- Ma Junwu, scientist, educator, and politician
- Ou Hongyi, climate activist
- Ouyang Xiadan, news anchor for China Central Television
- Pai Hsien-yung, writer
- Qiao Zhenyu, actor and dancer
- Shi Zhiyong, weightlifter
- Tang Jingsong, general and politician, first president of the Republic of Formosa
- Hong Wang, winner of the Fields Medal in 2026
- Daniel Weihs, Israeli professor of aeronautical engineering at the Technion – Israel Institute of Technology

== See also ==
- Bai Chongxi
- Alcoholic drinks in China
- Li Zongren
- Hạ Long Bay, a popular tourist destination in Vietnam with similar karst formations
- Chinese ship Guilin
