= List of destroyed heritage =

This is a list of cultural heritage sites that have been damaged or destroyed accidentally, deliberately, or by a natural disaster. The list is sorted by continent, then by country.

Cultural heritage can be subdivided into two main types: tangible and intangible. Tangible heritage includes built heritage (such as religious buildings, museums, monuments, and archaeological sites) and movable heritage (such as works of art and manuscripts). Intangible cultural heritage includes customs, music, fashion, and other traditions.

== Africa ==
=== Egypt ===
- The Library of Alexandria was destroyed during the Palmyrene invasion of Egypt and the following Roman counterattack in the 3rd century.
- In 1168, the capital of Egypt, Fustat, was intentionally set ablaze by its own vizier to deny the invading Crusaders its wealth. The resulting fire burned for 54 days and left the city in ruins.
- The Lighthouse of Alexandria, one of the Seven Wonders of the Ancient World, was gradually damaged and then destroyed by earthquakes from the 8th to the 14th centuries, collapsing around 1341.
- Between the 12th and 18th centuries, thousands of Egyptian mummies were ground up and sold as medicine. By the 19th century, mummies were no longer widely consumed for medicine but were still destroyed in Victorian-era “unwrapping parties” that unrolled mummies for entertainment at private events.
- A rock-cut portion of the Temple of Gerf Hussein was flooded by Lake Nasser.
- The building of the Institut d'Égypte, along with many documents located there, was burned down on 17 December 2011 during anti-government demonstrations of the Arab Spring. It reopened in December 2012.
- Villa Aghion, a modernist villa built by Auguste Perret in Alexandria, was demolished for redevelopment in 2014.
- In 2024, the Egyptian government began destroying parts of the 1200-year old Al-Qarafa Cemetery, part of the UNESCO Site of Old Cairo, in order to build a highway.

=== Libya ===
- Various sites were vandalized, looted, or destroyed during the First Libyan Civil War.
- The tomb of Zuhayr ibn Qays, located at the As-Sahabah Mosque in Derna, was destroyed by the Islamic State in July 2012.
- Multiple Sufi shrines near Tripoli were destroyed by the Islamic State in March 2015 during the Second Libyan Civil War.

=== Madagascar ===
In November 1995 a fire broke out in the Rova of Antananarivo, a royal palace of the Merina Kingdom since the 17th century. The fire destroyed or severely damaged all of its buildings. The last two reconstruction phases started in 2010, and by July 2020 the entire structure had been refurbished.

=== Mali ===
Parts of the World Heritage Site of Timbuktu were intentionally destroyed in the aftermath of the 2012 Fall of Timbuktu.

=== Nigeria ===
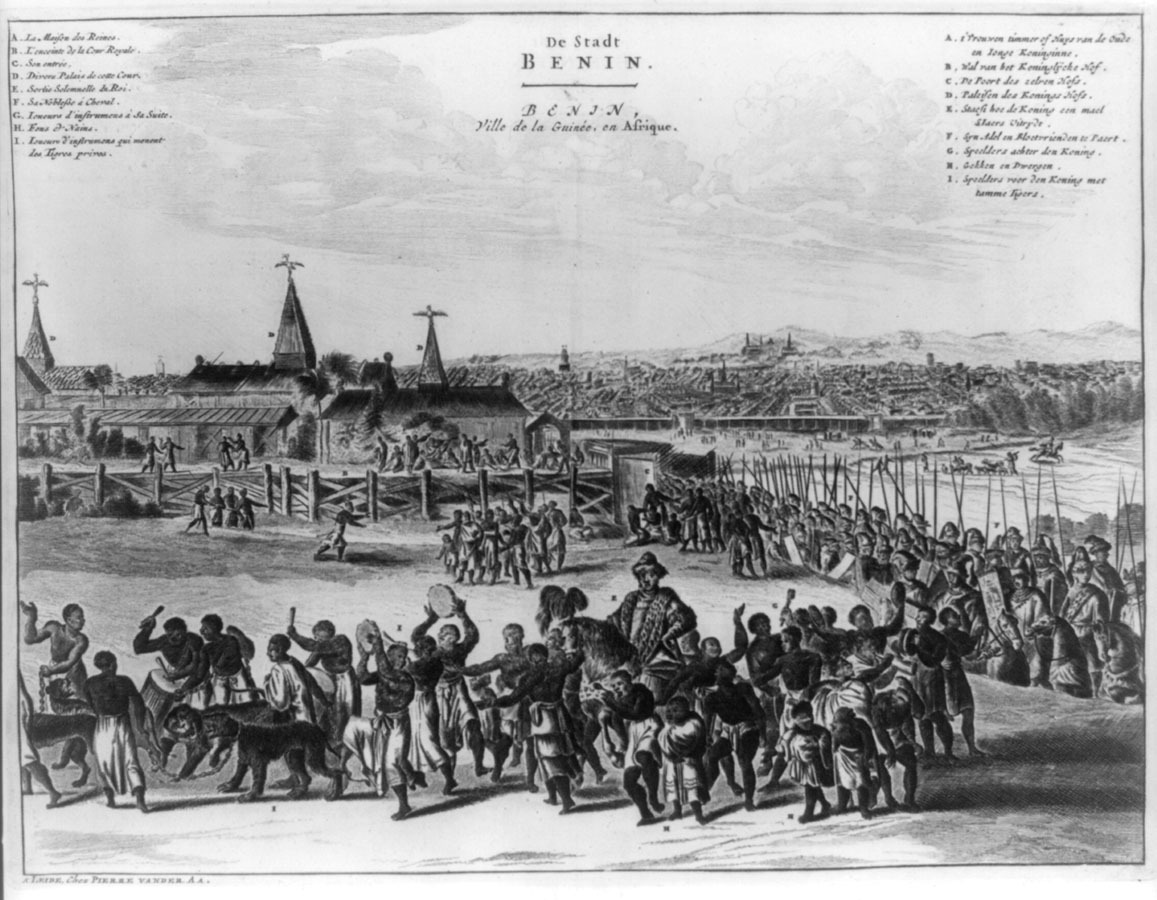
European depiction of Benin City in 1668

During the Benin Expedition of 1897 the British Empire launched a military campaign against Benin City, the capital of the Kingdom of Benin, during which much of the city was burned and numerous artifacts were looted.

=== South Africa ===
The 2021 Table Mountain fire partially or completely gutted several significant buildings and collections in the University of Cape Town. This included:

- Mostert's Mill, which had been built in 1796
- The university's Special Collections Library, which held over 1,300 collections and over 85,000 books and other items, including:
  - A historically significant Bible
  - An original illustration of The Jungle Book
  - Drawings, maps, and transcripts of stories from the indigenous peoples of the Cape
  - A major dictionary of the Xhosa language and copies of historic Xhosa language newspapers
  - Papers by Ray Alexander Simons and archives of papers relating to many anti-apartheid movements
  The fire completely gutted the Library's Reading Room. The vast majority of the African Studies Published Print Collection (about 70,000 items) and the entirety of the African Studies Film Collection DVDs (about 3,500 items) were destroyed, along with documents relating to the university itself.

=== Sudan ===
- Giuseppe Ferlini, an Italian physician, traveled to Meroë in 1834 in search of treasure. Using explosives, he dismantled the pyramids from the top down and destroyed more than 40 Nubian pyramids during his excavations.
- The Faras Cathedral was flooded by Lake Nasser. Some of the paintings were salvaged and are now located in the Faras Gallery at the National Museum in Warsaw.
- Most of the artifacts from the National Museum of Sudan were stolen or destroyed by the Rapid Support Forces between 2023 and 2025 during the Sudanese civil war.

=== Zimbabwe ===
The medieval city of Great Zimbabwe has faced the removal of gold and artifacts due to amateur digging by early colonial antiquarians. Further damage was caused by various reconstruction attempts and reckless behavior of visitors, as well as natural damage from vegetation growth, weathering, and settling of foundations.

== Asia ==
=== Afghanistan ===
In March 2001, a pair of 6th-century monumental statues known as the Buddhas of Bamiyan were dynamited by the Taliban, which had declared them heretical idols.

=== Armenia ===
Kond Mosque in Yerevan was partially demolished in the 1960s. in 1990, another mosque was pulled down with a bulldozer.

=== Azerbaijan ===
Multiple sites of Armenian cultural heritage were destroyed by the Azerbaijani authorities as part of their de-Armenization campaign:

- The Armenian cemetery in Julfa in the region of Nakhchivan was destroyed in December 2005. The Azerbaijani representative of Nakhchivan denied that there was an Armenian cemetery there in the first place.
- The Church of the Holy Virgin in Baku was demolished in 1992.
- The Kanach Zham of Shusha, located in the disputed region of Nagorno-Karabakh, was destroyed between December 2023 and April 2024.

=== Bahrain ===
At least 43 Shia mosques, including the ornate 400-year-old Amir Mohammed Braighi Mosque and many other religious structures, were destroyed by the Bahraini government during the Bahraini uprising of 2011.

=== Bangladesh ===
Several landmarks associated with the secular leader of Bangladesh, Sheikh Mujibur Rahman, were destroyed or damaged in arson attacks and looting that followed the non-cooperation movement. The destroyed landmarks included his former residence in Dhaka, which had been converted into the Bangabandhu Memorial Museum, as well as the Mujibnagar Memorial Complex. Other cultural institutions were also destroyed, including the 19th-century Bir Chandra Public Library in Comilla.

=== Cambodia ===
- The Roman Catholic Cathedral of Phnom Penh was the first building to be destroyed by the Khmer Rouge after the establishment of their regime.
- Our Lady of the Assumption Cathedral was destroyed in 1975.

=== China ===
- The Famen Temple went through several periods of destruction. First erected during the Eastern Han dynasty (25–220), it was destroyed during the rule of the Northern Zhou dynasty (557–581). After being rebuilt, it was destroyed again by an earthquake during the Longqing years (1567–1572) of the Ming dynasty. After another reconstruction, it was destroyed for the third time during the Cultural Revolution of 1966–1976. The present structure was completed in 1987 and opened to the public as a museum in 1988.
- More than 4,600 Buddhist temples were destroyed across the empire during the systematic persecution of Buddhists in 845 by the Taoist Emperor Wuzong of Tang.
- In 955, Emperor Shizong of the Later Zhou ordered the systematic destruction of Buddha statues for copper to mint coins, which led to 3,336 of China's 6,030 Buddhist temples being destroyed.
- Chang'an, a historical capital of several ancient Chinese empires, was occupied and ravaged during the Huang Chao rebellion (874–884). Chang'an never recovered after this obliteration, and its decline was followed by the fall of the Tang dynasty. Zhu Wen, Huang Chao's former lieutenant, completed the destruction by dismantling Chang'an and using the gathered materials to build the subsequent capital city of Luoyang.
- In 1739, the Pagoda of Chengtian Temple was destroyed after a large earthquake struck the city of Yinchuan. The pagoda was restored in 1820.
- The Porcelain Tower of Nanjing, which dates back to the 15th century, was destroyed over the course of the Taiping Rebellion (1850–1864). A modern life-size replica was built in 2015.
- Much of the Old Summer Palace, a Qing-era imperial palace, was set on fire and sacked during the Second Opium War in 1860. The palace was later sacked again and destroyed by the Eight-Nation Alliance when they invaded Beijing.
- Buddhist murals at the Bezeklik Thousand Buddha Caves were damaged by the local Muslim population. The eyes and mouths, in particular, were often gouged out. Pieces of murals were also broken off for use as fertilizer by the locals.
- Beijing city fortifications, which date back to the 15th–16th century, were destroyed during the decline of the Qing dynasty in the late 19th and early 20th centuries. They were severely damaged in the Boxer Rebellion (1898–1901), with the gate towers and watchtowers destroyed and troops of the Eight-Nation Alliance tearing down much of the outer city walls. After the collapse of the Qing in 1912 and the end of the Republic of China in 1949, the fortifications were dismantled to build modern ring roads around Beijing. Today, nothing of the outer city remains intact.
- In 1921, Buddhist murals at the Mogao Caves were damaged and vandalized by White Russian soldiers fleeing the Russian Civil War.
- More Buddhist murals were vandalized by Muslims during the Kumul Rebellion in Xinjiang in the 1930s.
- The White Horse Temple in Luoyang, the oldest Buddhist temple in China, was destroyed during the Cultural Revolution of the 1960s and 1970s. Some historical artifacts are still missing.
- A shrine dedicated to Wei Yan was destroyed by the Chinese government in 1968. A stone tablet that contained the record of his presence was lost after the demolition. The shrine was rebuilt in 1995.
- Yongdingmen, the former front gate of the outer city wall of the Beijing city fortifications, which dates back to 1553, was demolished in the 1950s to make way for the new road system. It was rebuilt in 2005.
- The Gate of China in Beijing was demolished by the Chinese government in 1954 to make way for the expansion of Tiananmen Square. The Chairman Mao Memorial Hall occupies the former site of the gate.
- Historical neighborhoods of Beijing and Nanjing were razed during the development of the cities.
- More than 30,000 items compiled from various archaeological and historic sites and listed by the National Cultural Heritage Administration of China were destroyed during the country's development. Destroyed heritage sites include the old town in Dinghai, the old town of Laoximen in Shanghai, a centuries-old market street in Qianmen, and a section of the Great Wall of China.
- The construction of the Three Gorges Dam on the Yangtze River caused water levels to rise, destroying entire cities and historical locations along the river.
- In 2016, the Chinese government ordered the demolition of historical houses in Larung Gar, a large Tibetan Buddhist institution.
- By 2017, the old town of Kashgar had been destroyed by the Chinese government and replaced by a significantly smaller, lower-quality "theme park" version of the site.
- Multiple historic bridges, including the Lecheng Bridge and the Zhenhai Bridge, were destroyed during the 2020 China floods.

=== Georgia ===
In 2024, a fire destroyed the National Art Gallery in Sukhumi and all but 150 of the 4,000 paintings in its collection.

=== India ===
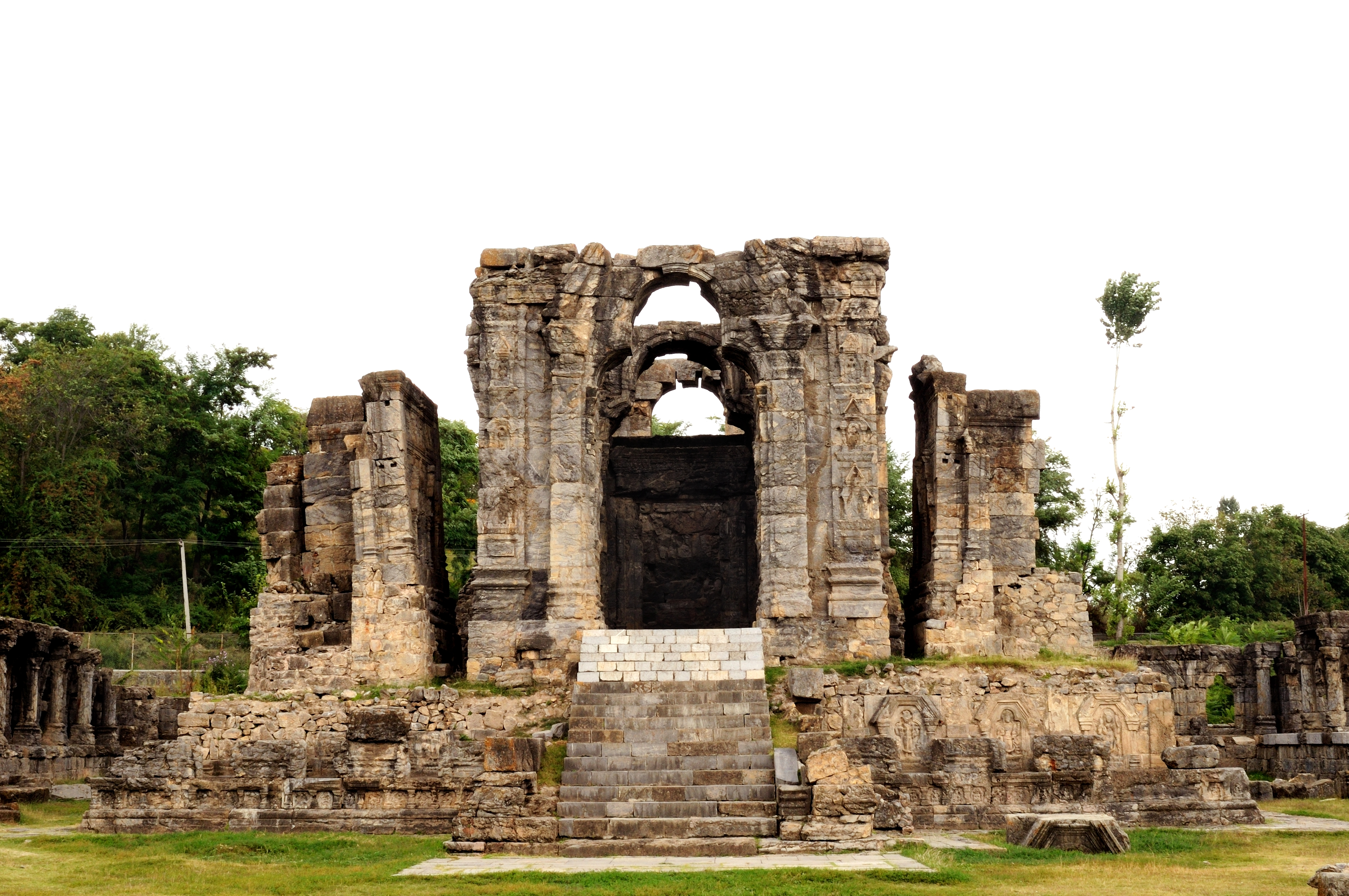
Martand Sun Temple

- The Somnath temple was destroyed multiple times. In 1024, the Afghan ruler Mahmud of Ghazni plundered the temple and broke its jyotirlinga. In 1299, Alauddin Khalji's army under the leadership of Ulugh Khan defeated Karandev II and sacked the (rebuilt) Somnath temple. By 1665, the rebuilt temple was once again damaged by the Mughal emperor Aurangzeb. In 1702, he ordered that the temple be demolished completely if Hindus had revived worship there.
- Around 1200, the most prominent seats of learning in Ancient India—Nalanda University, Buddhist monasteries, and the educational centers of Vikramasila and Odantapuri—were sacked and destroyed by the Bengal ruler Muhammad bin Bakhtiyar Khalji.
- The Shiva temples of Puneshwar and Narayaneshwar in Pune were destroyed by the invading army of Alauddin Khalji. Later, a tomb of a Muslim preacher was erected at the sites.
- In the 14th century, Hampi, the second-biggest city in the world at the time, was destroyed by the armies of the Delhi Sultanate, those of Alauddin Khalji and Muhammad bin Tughlaq.
- The famous Martand Sun Temple, located in Jammu and Kashmir, was destroyed by Sultan Sikandar Butshikan in the early 15th century.
- In 1565, after the Battle of Talikota, the capital city of Vijayanagara was sacked and destroyed by an invading army of the Bahmani Sultanates.
- In 1664, Aurangzeb destroyed the Kashi Vishwanath Temple and built the Gyanvapi Mosque over its walls. The remnants of the temple wall can still be seen today, as depicted in the 19th-century sketch by James Prinsep.
- On 26 April 2016, the National Museum of Natural History, New Delhi, and its valuable collection of animal fossils and taxidermy animals were destroyed by fire.

=== Indonesia ===
Kraton Majapahit, the royal palace of Majapahit emperors, was destroyed in the Demak–Majapahit conflicts. What remained of the palace and the fortifications around it was further looted by treasure hunters during the Dutch colonial era.

=== Iran ===
- In 330 BCE, Alexander the Great sent the main force of his army to Persepolis by the Royal Road and destroyed it.
- The Cypress of Kashmar, a sacred tree in Zoroastrianism, was cut down at the order of Al-Mutawakkil in 861.
- During the reign of Naser al-Din Shah Qajar, the Nahavand Castle was ruined in hopes of finding treasure beneath it.
- In mid-March (2026), Iran's Ministry of Cultural Heritage, Tourism and Handicrafts reported that at least 56 historic sites had been damaged by the war, including museums and cultural heritage monuments. Of the sites where damaged has been recorded, 19 are in Iran's capital, Tehran.
- On 2 March, a strike on Arg Square damaged the nearby Golestan Palace, a UNESCO World Heritage Site, prompting UNESCO to issue a statement of concern.
- In 2026, the Azadi Sport Complex was bombed.
- A strike on 8 March 2026 on Falak-ol-Aflak Castle (also known as Shapur Khast Castle), which was marked with a blue shield emblem, damaged several sections of the site, destroyed its museum, and injured five museum workers.
- Strikes on Isfahan on 9 March 2026 damaged Naqsh-e Jahan Square, Chehel Sotoun, Ali Qapu, the Shah Mosque, Jameh Mosque, and Teymouri Hall.
- During the same period Rashk-e Jenan in Isfahan was completely destroyed by the Israeli Air Force.

=== Iraq ===
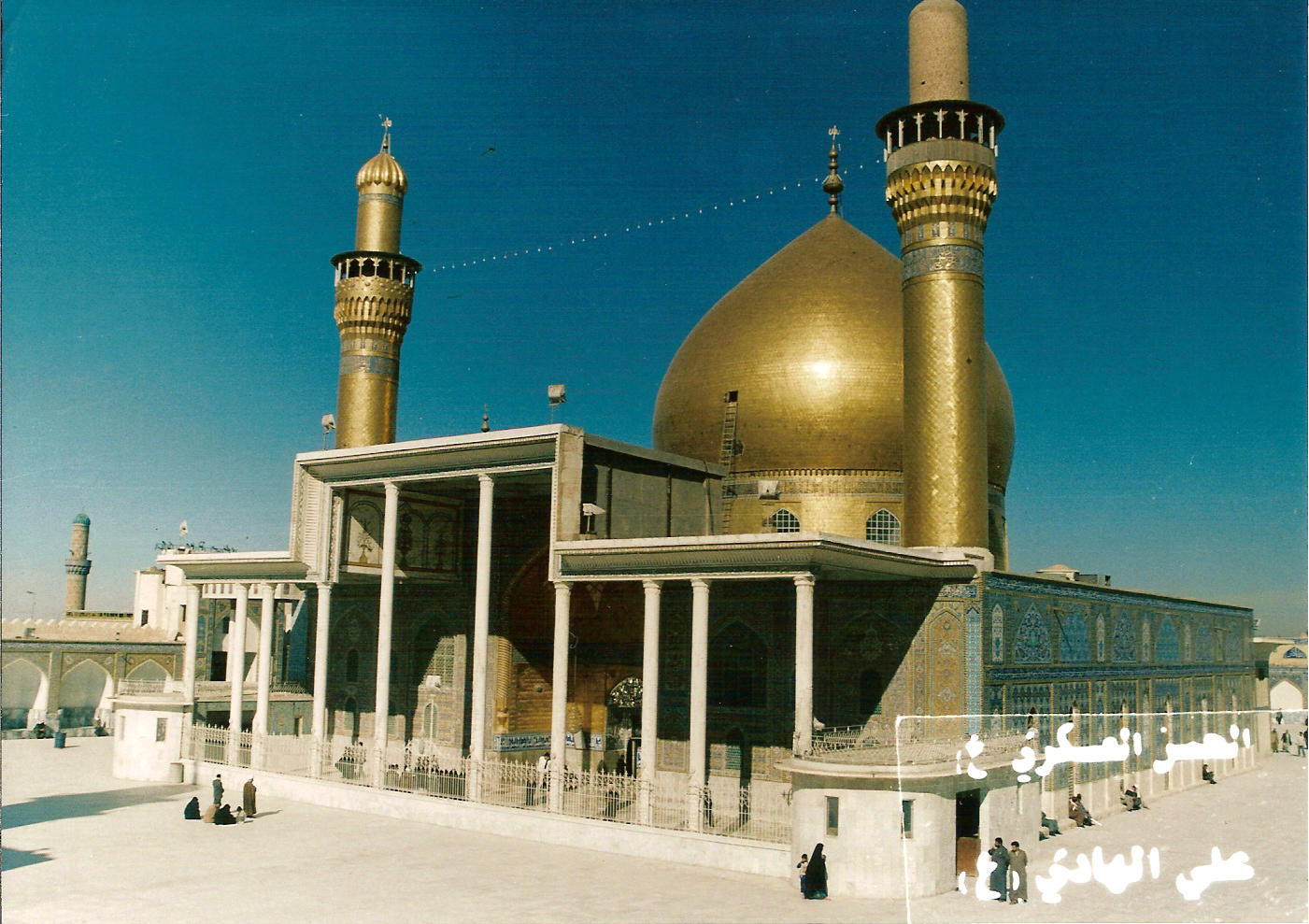
Al-Askari Mosque

- The Hanging Gardens of Babylon, one of the Seven Wonder of the Ancient World, is believed to have been destroyed sometime after the 1st century. However, there is scholarly debate over the location of the Gardens, and whether they existed at all.
- The Round City of Baghdad, the seat of the Abbasid caliph, was sacked by the Mongol army led by Hulegu in 1258. Large sections of the city, as well as the irrigation system and the House of Wisdom, a library and an intellectual center, were destroyed. The city was attacked again by Tamerlane in 1401, leading to it being almost entirely destroyed.
- In 1802, during the Wahhabi sack of Karbala, raiders plundered the Imam Husayn Shrine, destroying its historic golden dome. The attackers seized centuries of accumulated wealth including gold, silver, jewels, pearls, currency, Persian carpets, and firearms. Among the looted treasures were significant riches originally brought by Nadir Shah following his India campaign.
- The Qurnah disaster was an 1855 archaeological shipwreck near Al-Qurnah, Ottoman Iraq, in which a convoy carrying hundreds of Mesopotamian antiquities sank after being attacked.
- Several historical gates of Baghdad dating back to the 12th century were demolished by the occupying Allied and Ottoman forces during the First World War.
- In 1977-1987, the construction of the Haditha Dam led to the ancient archeological sites of Usiyeh and Anah to be flooded. Only modern Anah exists today.
- Since the US-led invasion of Iraq in 2003, various archaeological sites and museums have been looted, including the ancient cities of Adab, Hatra and Isin, where US military protection was absent. The most prominent among them is the Iraq Museum, where as many as 170,000 items were looted, including some 5,000-year-old statues. In addition, several sites, such as Babylon, saw the destruction of its archaeologically rich subsoil as a result of military planning.
- In April of 2003, the National Archives of Iraq was burned and destroyed. Dating since the late Ottoman period, an estimated 60 percent of its total archival materials, 25 percent of its books, newspapers, rare books, and most of its historical photographs and maps were destroyed. Included in the rare volumes and documents lost was one of the oldest copies of the Quran.
- During the Iraqi civil war (2006–2008), several historical sites were destroyed by various groups. In 2006, the Minaret of Anah and the statue of Al-Mansur were bombed by Shia militants and destroyed. In 2006 and 2007, the Al-Askari Mosque was bombed by Sunni militants twice in the course of two years. The buildings were later reconstructed.
- The Islamic State of Iraq and Syria (ISIS) destroyed much of the cultural heritage in the areas it controlled in Iraq. At least 28 religious buildings were looted and destroyed, including Shiite mosques, tombs, shrines, and churches. Numerous ancient and medieval sites and artifacts, including the ancient cities of Nimrud and Hatra, parts of the wall of Nineveh, the ruins of Bash Tapia Castle and Dair Mar Elia, and artifacts from the Mosul Museum were also destroyed. After ISIS was defeated and driven out of Mosul in 2017, many churches, mosques, and historic buildings were rebuilt.
- In 2023, the 300-year old historic brick minaret of Al-Siraji Mosque in Basra was razed overnight to clear space for a road expansion project.

=== Israel ===
- The Allenby Square Clock Tower was a short-lived monument in West Jerusalem that stood from 1923 until its demolition in 1934.
- During the Nakba in 1948, more than 530 Palestinian villages and towns were depopulated, with many subsequently destroyed or demolished. Remnants of some of these communities survive as ruins, including in areas that are now part of Israeli forests and national parks.
- Old Haifa, largely developed during the 18th century under Zahir al-Umar and expanded during the late Ottoman period, was destroyed during the 1948 Arab-Israeli War and was further demolished during Operation Shikmona, an urban redevelopment program undertaken by the newly established Israeli municipality. The program involved the clearance of much of the former Old City including large sections of the historic urban fabric, including residential buildings, traditional markets, and commercial streets. Hundreds of historic stone structures were consequently lost. A small number of historic neighbourhoods and religious buildings survived the clearance, including the Al-Jarina Mosque and several churches.
- The Hejaz Railway, built in 1908, faced destruction over many phases. The Jezreel Valley line, was progressively disabled by sabotage during the final years of the British Mandate:
  - In 1945, during the Night of the Trains, railway infrastructure was damaged across the mandate, including the Afula station area.
  - In 1946, the Palmach destroyed the Yarmuk railway bridge, severing the line from the rest of the Hejaz Railway.
  - During the Arab-Israeli conflict in 1948, the railway was permanently severed and put out of commission after bridges and tracks were targeted and destroyed. The final blow coming in 14 May 1948, when Jewish forces destroyed a bridge near Geva and one near Gesher, effectively rendering the remaining line inoperable.
  - Jenin Railway Station was completely demolished in 2002 by military bulldozers during Operation Defensive Shield.
  - Iraq al-Manshiyya Station was heavily targeted and completely destroyed during World War I as British forces pushed the Ottomans out of the region. Following the 1948 war; the station's remnants were completely flattened.
  - Kfar Baruch Station, originally built in 1926 to serve the local agricultural community, this station was a basic wooden passenger shack with no formal ticket booths. Today, there are no remnants left of the original historic structure
  - Masudiya Station, built in 1914, was abandoned after the branch lines were severed in 1948. Today, the station sits in ruins within a restricted zone; it has faced structural collapse, neglect, and military closure.
  - Tulkarm Railway Station operations permanently halted during the 1948 war. Due to its positioning right on the 1949 Armistice Line (Green Line), the historical rail infrastructure was progressively dismantled, built over, and demolished during decades of urban re-development and border fortification.
  - El Hamma Station was destroyed in 1946 during the Night of the Bridges where Zionist paramilitary forces blew up the nearby railway bridge spanning the river to cut off Palestine from neighboring Arab states. Left stranded without a connection, the station fell into total disuse. Following subsequent conflicts in 1948 and 1967, the station facilities were permanently abandoned, and the historic tracks were torn up and buried.

=== Palestine ===
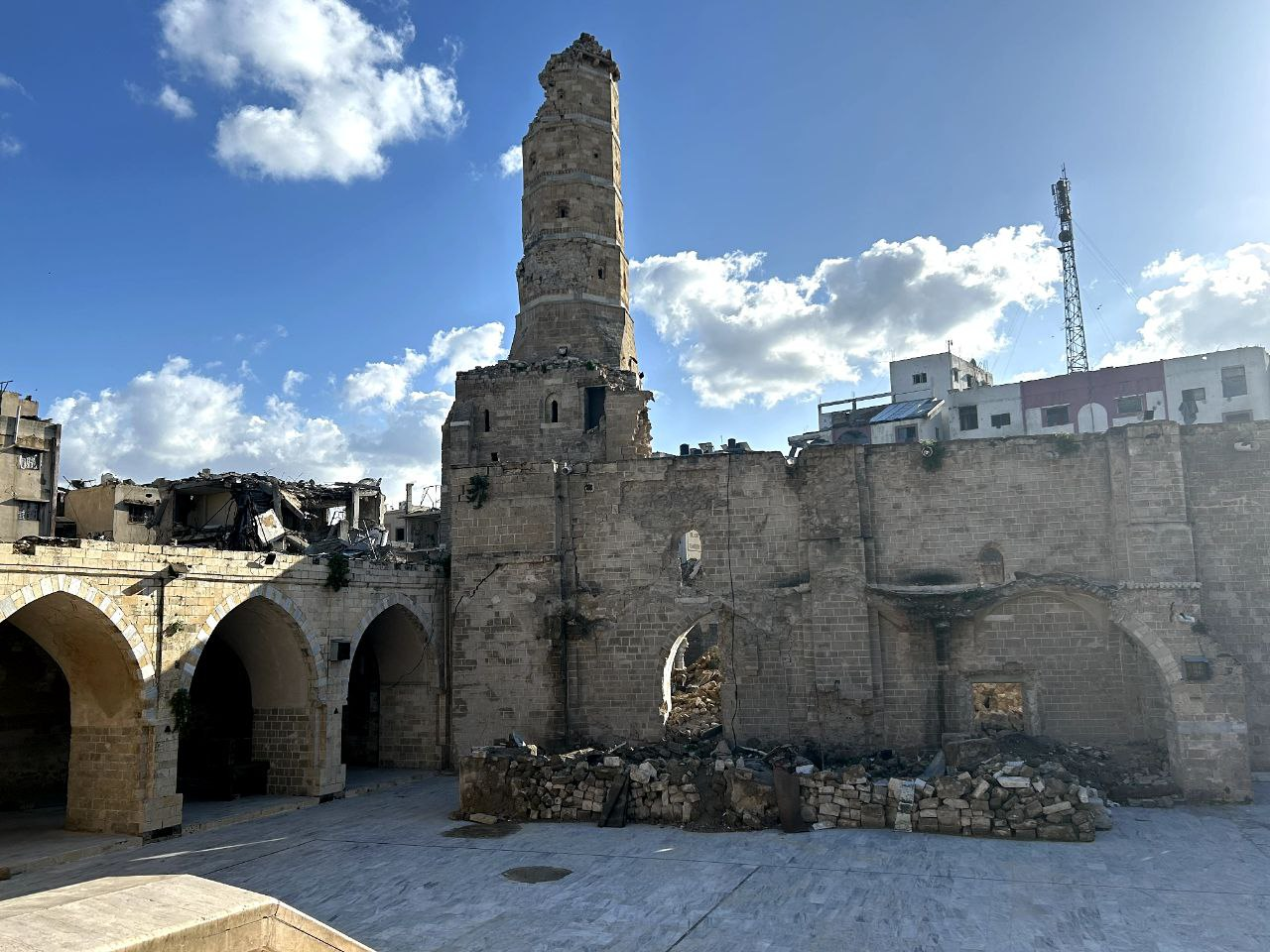
The Great Omari Mosque in Gaza City (pictured in 2025) was hit by an Israeli airstrike during the Gaza war.

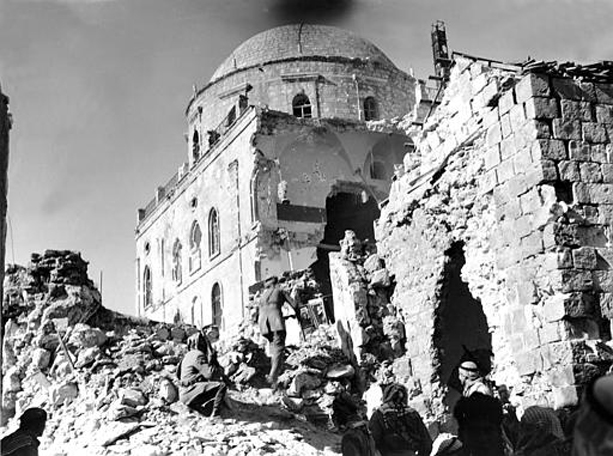
Jordanian Arab Legion in the process of destroying the Tiferet Yisrael Synagogue, May 1948

- The First Temple in Jerusalem was destroyed by the Neo-Babylonian Empire in 587/586 BCE, and the Second Temple by the Roman Empire in 70 CE.
- The Jerusalem Clock Tower was demolished by the British Mandate authorities in 1922, reportedly because its architectural style was considered incompatible with the historic character of the Old City.
- Following the conquest of the Old City of Jerusalem by the Arab Legion in 1948, under the Jordanian annexation, Jewish sites were systematically damaged and destroyed. In particular, all but one of the thirty-five synagogues of the Jewish Quarter were destroyed.
- The Shrine of Husayn's Head was built by the Fatimids on a hilltop adjacent to Ascalon that was reputed to have held the head of Husayn ibn Ali between c. 906 and 1153. It was described as the most magnificent building in the ancient city, and developed into the most important and holiest Shi'a site in Palestine. The shrine was destroyed in 1950 by the Israeli army, more than a year after hostilities ended, on the orders of Moshe Dayan. This was in accordance with a 1950s Israeli policy of erasing Muslim historical sites within Israel, and in line with efforts to expel the remaining Palestinian Arabs from the region.
- Following Israel's victory during the 1967 Six-Day War, the Israeli military destroyed a large part of the Moroccan Quarter in Jerusalem's Old Town to make room for a plaza in front of the Western Wall.
- In the 1970s, a Late Neolithic archaeological site was bulldozed for the construction of Shiqma Reservoir near Zikim, a kibbutz in Israel.
- The Baptist Church of Jerusalem in Narkis Street was burned down in 1982 in a suspected arson, and subjected to another arson attack in 2007.
- In 2015, in one of a series of attacks on churches in Israel and the West Bank by Jewish extremist groups, a former settler on the West Bank torched and set fire to the Church of the Multiplication in Tabgha on the shore of the Sea of Galilee in northern Israel. This was the church where some Christians believe Jesus carried out his miracle of the feeding of the 5,000.
- Joseph's Tomb in Nablus has been repeatedly vandalized, with Palestinian mobs burning and pillaging it immediately after the withdrawal of Israeli forces in 2000, in 2003, and in 2009, when the tomb was vandalized with graffiti, including swastikas. The tomb was vandalized again by Palestinian rioters in 2015 and 2022.
- During the Gaza war, Israel damaged or destroyed more than 100 heritage sites in the Gaza Strip, including the Church of Saint Porphyrius, the Great Mosque of Gaza, and the Rafah Museum.

=== Japan ===
- The majority of Japanese castles were smashed and destroyed in the late 19th century during the Meiji Restoration. This was done by the Japanese people and government in order to modernize and westernize Japan and break from their past feudal era of the daimyo and shoguns. Concrete replicas of the castles were built for tourists prior to the 1964 Summer Olympics in Japan. The vast majority of castles in Japan today are new replicas made of concrete.
- Komine Castle collapsed in the 1970s due to rain, as its base was made of earth with uneven stones. The Japanese local government repaired it with concrete, but because of that, the entire section of the repaired wall was destroyed by the earthquake in 2011.
- Ryōunkaku, Japan's first skyscraper, was severely damaged during the 1923 Great Kantō earthquake. Twelve people inside the tower were killed and another was injured. It was demolished less than a month later, on 23 September 1923.
- During the Meiji Restoration's shinbutsu bunri, tens of thousands of Buddhist religious statues and temples were destroyed.
- The Kannon-dō temple at Sensō-ji was destroyed in 1945 during World War II.
- Kumamoto Castle was severely damaged in 1877 during the Siege of Kumamoto Castle, part of the larger Satsuma Rebellion. It was subsequently rebuilt in the 1960s, with further historical restoration work completed from 1998 to 2008. The castle was seriously damaged again during the 2016 Kumamoto earthquakes, with the required rebuilding effort estimated to take several decades.
- Shuri Castle, a palace of the Ryukyu Kingdom first built in the 14th century, was destroyed in a fire during the Battle of Okinawa in World War II. It was reconstructed in the 1990s, before partially burning down again on 31 October 2019.
- The Kinkaku-ji (Golden Pavilion) of Kyoto was burned down by an arsonist in 1950, and was restored in 1955.
- A large number of Important Cultural Property, libraries, museums, and other archives were damaged or destroyed by the 2011 Tōhoku earthquake and tsunami.

=== Lebanon ===
- In 2012, the remains of an ancient temple foundation and a Phoenician port in Beirut, dating to at least the 5th century BCE, were demolished after the Minister of Culture approved their removal for a proposed US$500 million luxury skyscraper development. The project was ultimately never built.
- The 2020 Beirut explosion severely damaged dozens of historic structures, most notably the Sursock Palace, the Sursock Museum, and the historic districts of Gemayzeh and Mar Mikhael.
- On 9 October 2024, during the Israeli invasion of Lebanon, a 19th-century church in Derdghaya was destroyed by an IDF airstrike.
- Tibnin Castle was damaged during the Israeli invasion of Lebanon in 2024, and one of its walls collapsed.

=== Malaysia ===
Candi Number 11, also known as Candi Sungai Batu Estate, a 1,200-year-old ruin of a tomb-temple located in the Bujang Valley historical complex in Kedah, was demolished in 2013 by housing developers who claimed not to have known the historical significance of the stone edifice.

=== Maldives ===
On 7 February 2012, in the aftermath of the coup in which President Mohamed Nasheed was overthrown, the National Museum was stormed by Islamists who destroyed Buddhist artifacts. Most of the Buddhist physical history of the Maldives was obliterated. Hindu artifacts were also targeted for obliteration, and the actions have been compared to the attacks on the Buddhas of Bamiyan by the Taliban.

=== Myanmar ===
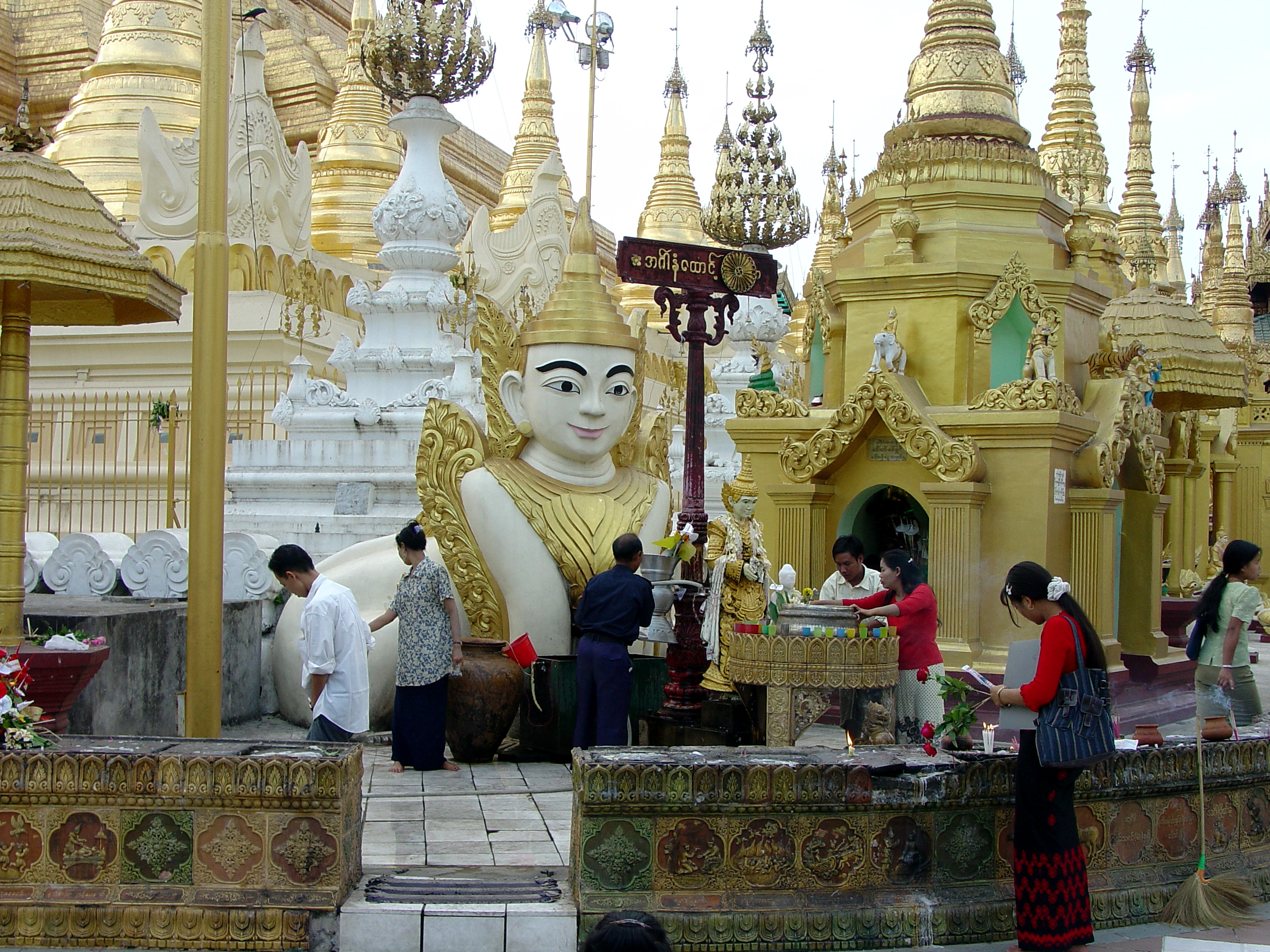
Shwedagon Paya temple

- Mandalay Palace, a former 19th-century royal palace of Burmese kings, was burned down to the ground in 1945 during the Battle of Mandalay between Allied and Japanese forces.
- Shwedagon Paya temple complex in Yangon, built between the 6th and 10th centuries, was severely damaged when Cyclone Nargis struck the region in 2008, which caused the worst natural disaster in the recorded history of Myanmar.

=== Nepal ===
- The 7.8 M_{w} Nepal earthquake in 2015 demolished heritage sites in the Kathmandu Valley. It destroyed centuries-old medieval temples and sites in Kathmandu—two of the Durbar Squares (Bhaktapur and Patan), as well as the tower of Dharahara, the temple of Changunarayan, some temples of the Pashupatinath complex, the main stupa of Boudhanath, and the temples of Swayambhunath Stupa.
- Singha Durbar was destroyed during the September 2025 Nepalese protests.
- International Convention Centre was destroyed during the September 2025 Nepalese protests.

=== Pakistan ===
- The Harappa archaeological site, which dates back to 2600 BCE, was heavily damaged during the Indian Rebellion of 1857. Bricks from the ruins were removed and used as track ballast during the construction of the Lahore–Multan railway line.
- The Multan Sun Temple, a grand Hindu temple built in 614 CE or earlier, was destroyed in the late 10th century by Ismaili rulers. A mosque was built in its place, but it was also destroyed in the 11th century by Mahmud of Ghazni. The ruins of the temple exist in modern-day Multan, Pakistan.
- The Prahladpuri Temple, Multan, was destroyed by Muslims in 1992 in the aftermath of the Babri Masjid's destruction in India.
- The Shaheed Ganj Mosque in Lahore was demolished by Sikhs in 1935.
- Looters and the Taliban destroyed many of Pakistan's Buddhist artifacts from the Gandhara civilization, especially in Swat Valley. Gandhara Buddhist relics were deliberately targeted by the Taliban for destruction and illegally looted by smugglers.

=== Philippines ===
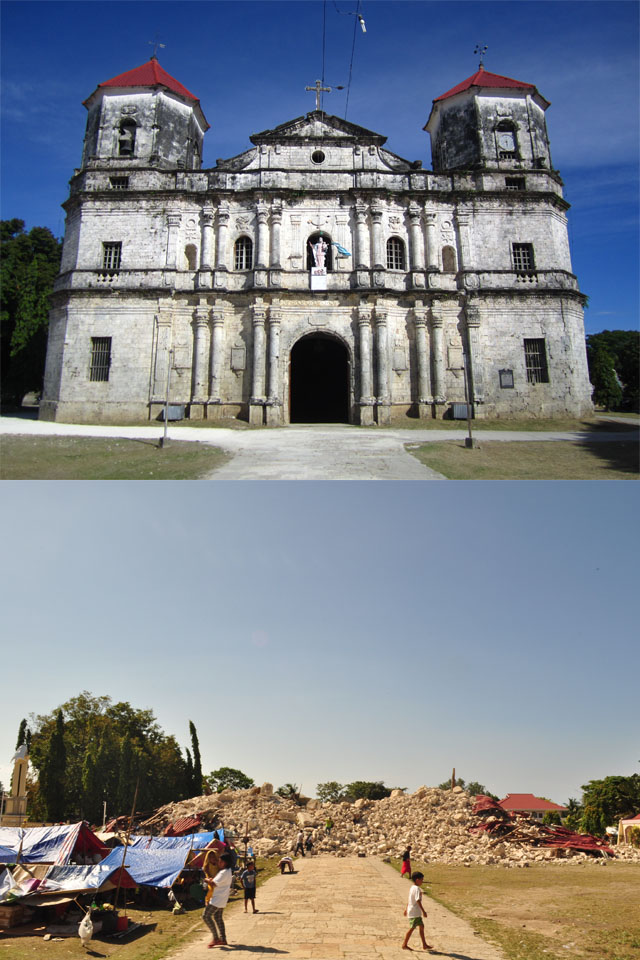
The Loon Church before and after the 2013 Bohol earthquake. It has since been reconstructed as faithfully as possible to the original plans and using the original masonry.

- The city of Kota Seludong was set on fire by Spanish invaders in 1580.
- During the Battle of Manila in 1945, most of the city's unique architecture was destroyed. After the battle, only two pre-war buildings remained intact, although their plumbing had been looted. After the war, much of Manila was rebuilt in a modernist style, and the city's original architectural heritage is now mostly lost.
- Manila Jai Alai Building, a historic jai alai venue, was demolished in 2000 despite opposition from heritage conservationists. The demolition led to the passage of the National Cultural Heritage Act of 2009.
- Several historic buildings were damaged or destroyed during the 2013 Bohol earthquake, including the Loboc Church, the Loon Church, the Maribojoc Church, and the Baclayon Church.
- The Philippine Su Kuang Institute building was demolished in 2017, within a year after the owners sold the building to a private developer. The 1940s-era building was the last wooden Art Deco school structure in Binondo, Manila.
- In 2023, the Manila Central Post Office burned down along with its valuable stamp collection.

=== Saudi Arabia ===
- Al-Baqi Cemetery was destroyed for the first time in 1806 when the First Saudi State occupied Medina and demolished the Ottoman-built mausoleums and domes over the graves.
- A 6th-century Dadanite lion gargoyle, depicting the deity Dhu-Ghabat, was documented and photographed by French archaeologists in 1914. The artifact has since been lost and its current whereabouts remain unknown.
- Since the re-establishment of the Third Saudi state, various mosques and other historic sites such as the Ajyad Fortress, especially those relating to early Islam, have been destroyed in Saudi Arabia. This has been done both for economic reasons to create room for hajj pilgrims and for ideological reasons related to the iconoclastic religious doctrine of the state Wahhabi sect.

=== Singapore ===
The Singapore Stone was blown up in 1843 to make way for Fort Fullerton. One fragment survives and is currently displayed at the National Museum of Singapore. It has been designated as a national treasure of Singapore.

=== South Korea ===
- Hwangnyongsa, a Buddhist temple in Gyeongju which dates back to the 7th century, was burned down by Mongolians during their invasion in 1238.
- Hundreds of Buddhist monasteries were shut down or destroyed during the Joseon period as part of the government's anti-Buddhism policy. In 1407, King Taejong imposed regulations limiting the allowed number of Buddhist temples to 88. Sejong the Great further reduced the number to 36. Many Buddhist statues were also destroyed during the reign of Jungjong (1506–1544).
- The 1954 Busan Yongdusan fires destroyed many important cultural and historical artifacts. Among them, 30 of the 48 remaining portraits of Joseon Dynasty royals were completely destroyed, and most of the remaining portraits were heavily damaged.
- Namdaemun was damaged by arson in 2008. It reopened in 2013.
- In March 2021, a main hall of the historic Naejangsan temple in Jeongeup was burned down by a 53-year-old monk arsonist.

=== Sri Lanka ===
- The palace of King Parakramabahu I was set on fire by the Kalinga Magha–led invasion in the 11th century.
- The Jaffna Public Library, which contained over 97,000 manuscripts, was burned in 1981, leading up to the Sri Lankan civil war.

=== Syria ===
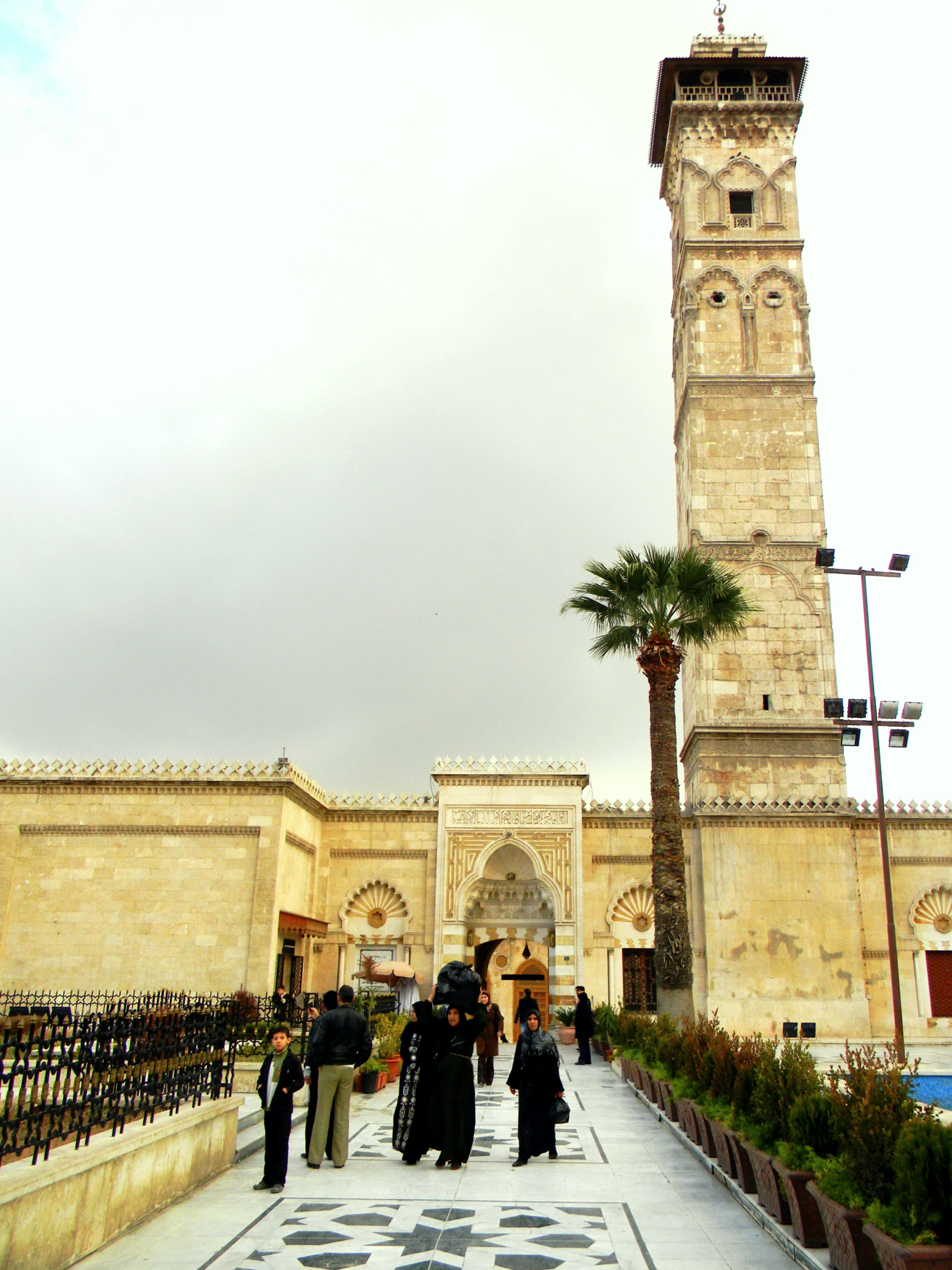
Minaret of the Great Mosque of Aleppo, destroyed in 2013

- The Aleppo Codex, the authoritative Hebrew Bible text, was partially destroyed during the 1947 anti-Jewish riots in Aleppo.
- Much of Syria's cultural heritage was harmed or destroyed during the Syrian Civil War. Destroyed buildings include the minaret of the Great Mosque of Aleppo and the Al-Madina Souq, while others, such as Krak des Chevaliers, were damaged.
- Khusruwiyah Mosque was destroyed during the Battle of Aleppo.
- The Islamic State of Iraq and the Levant (ISIL) destroyed the Lion of Al-lāt, the temples of Bel and Baalshamin, the Arch of Triumph, and other sites in Palmyra. The group also destroyed the Monastery of St. Elian, the Armenian Genocide Memorial Church, and several ancient sculptures in the city of Raqqa.
- During the Turkish military operation in Afrin in 2018, Turkish shelling seriously damaged the ancient temple of Ain Dara in Afrin.

=== Thailand ===
- The original Dusit Zoo in Bangkok, built in 1938, was demolished in 2018.
- The Parliament House of Thailand, which housed the legislative branch of the Thai government from 1974 to 2018, was demolished in 2019.

=== Turkey ===
- The Temple of Artemis, one of the Seven Wonders of the Ancient World, was destroyed by arson in 356 BCE. It was later rebuilt but was damaged in a raid by Goths in 268 CE. Its stones were subsequently used in other buildings. A few fragments of the structure still survive in situ.
- The Library of Antioch was destroyed at the order of Emperor Jovian in 363.
- The Mausoleum at Halicarnassus, another Wonder of the Ancient World, was destroyed by a series of earthquakes between the 12th and 15th centuries. Most of the remaining marble blocks were burnt into lime, but some were used in the construction of Bodrum Castle by the Knights Hospitaller, where they can still be seen today.
- The port city of İzmir (Smyrna) was destroyed during the burning of Smyrna in the aftermath of the Greco-Turkish War.
- The abandonment and confiscation of Armenian monasteries and cultural heritage in places such as Ani contributed to their eventual destruction. In 1974, UNESCO stated that after 1923, out of 913 Armenian historical monuments left in Eastern Turkey, 464 had vanished completely, 252 were in ruins, and 197 needed repair. In 2011, there were 34 Armenian churches functioning in Turkey, primarily in Istanbul.

=== Turkmenistan ===
- The Church of the Transfiguration in Ashgabat was destroyed in 1932 by the Soviet government.
- The country's only Bahá'í Temple in Ashgabat, which was completed in 1908, was damaged in the 1948 Ashgabat earthquake before being completely destroyed in 1962.

== Europe ==
=== Albania ===
Sulejman Pasha Mosque was destroyed during World War II, although its minaret remained until 1967 when the communist regime of Enver Hoxha built a war memorial in its place.

=== Austria ===
Cathedral of St. Stephen in Vienna was severely damaged in 1945, towards the end of the Second World War. Incendiary bombs and shelling set the roof on fire, and the cathedral's original larch girders, said to be made from an entire forest of larches, were destroyed, as were the Rollinger choir stalls, carved in 1487. The building was rebuilt soon after the war.

=== Belgium ===
- The Palace of Coudenberg in Brussels burned down in 1731, and its ruins were demolished half a century later.
- Many churches and abbeys were demolished during the French occupation in the late 18th century, among them St. Lambert's Cathedral in Liège, St. Donatian's Cathedral and Eekhout Abbey in Bruges, Florennes Abbey in Florennes, and St. Michael's Abbey in Antwerp.
- In 1826, a fire destroyed much of Herkenrode Abbey in Hasselt, and the remaining ruins were demolished in 1844.
- During World War I, the city of Ypres was destroyed, including its town hall and the Cloth Hall. These monuments were later rebuilt.
- On 25 August 1914, during World War I, the university library of Leuven was destroyed by the Germans amid the Rape of Belgium. 230,000 volumes were lost, including medieval and Renaissance manuscripts and over a thousand incunables. After the war, a new library was built. During World War II, the new building was again set on fire, and nearly a million books were lost.
- The Maison du Peuple in Brussels, one of the largest works of architect Victor Horta, was demolished in 1965 to make way for an office building.
- The Valemprez farm, a 13th-century farmhouse rebuilt in the 18th century in Dottignies, was demolished again in 2008.
- Château Miranda, a 19th-century neo-Gothic castle in Celles, was demolished in 2016–17.

=== Bosnia and Herzegovina ===
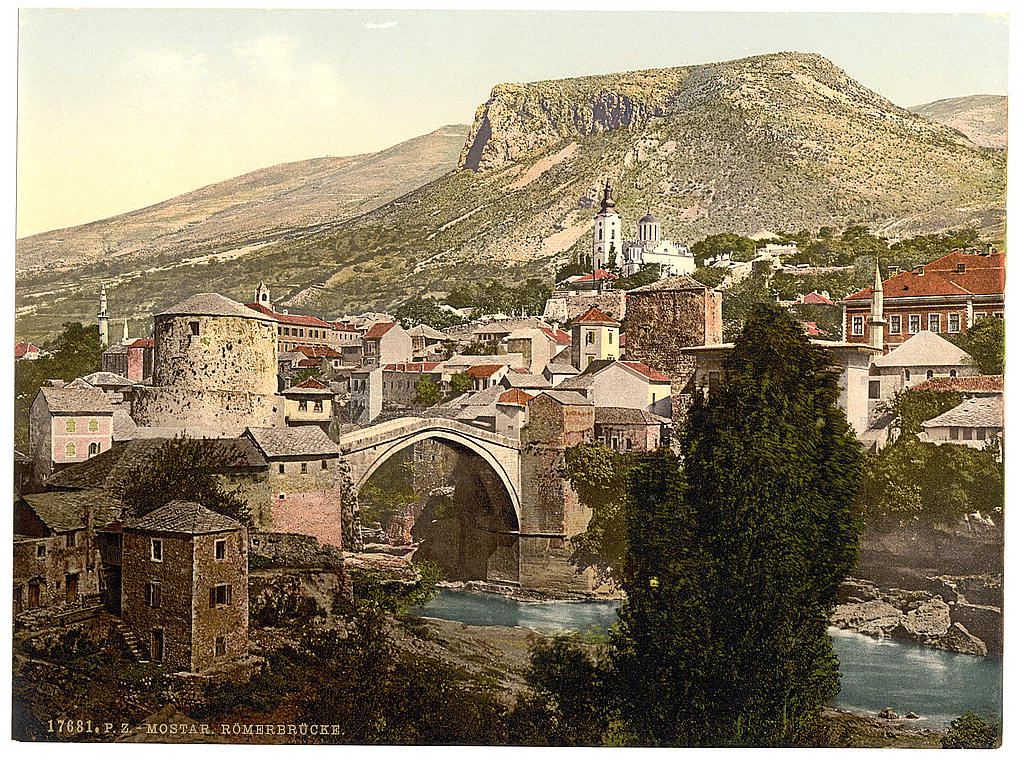
Stari Most, a UNESCO World Heritage Site, and the monumental Serbian Orthodox Cathedral of the Holy Trinity (white church in the background) were destroyed by Croat forces in the Bosnian War but were later rebuilt.

Through the course of the Bosnian War, numerous sites of cultural and religious heritage were destroyed:

- During the Siege of Sarajevo, the National and University Library of Bosnia and Herzegovina was specifically targeted and besieged by cannons positioned around the city and was destroyed in the fire, along with 80 percent of its contents. Three million books were destroyed, along with hundreds of original documents from the Ottoman Empire and the Austro-Hungarian monarchy.
- Muslim heritage sites suffered the most, with 614 mosques and several other religious facilities, schools, and institutions destroyed by the authorities of the Republic of Srpska as part of the ethnic cleansing campaign against the local Muslim populations. The best known among them include Mehmed Pasha Kukavica Mosque, Arnaudija Mosque, and Ferhat Pasha Mosque. A substantial proportion of these mosques dated back to the Ottoman and Austro-Hungarian eras. Many of them, such as the Ferhadija and Arnaudija mosques, have since been rebuilt with financial and professional assistance from Turkey.
- The Ottoman clock tower of Banja Luka was also destroyed in the efforts to eliminate Ottoman heritage sites in the region.
- Roman Catholic sites suffered, with over 269 churches destroyed, which was associated with the killings of Bosnian Croats, mostly by Bosnian Serbs.
- As many as 125 Serbian Orthodox religious buildings were destroyed in the war, such as the 13th-century Sase Monastery and Vozuća Monastery.
- Parts of the old city of Mostar, including the Stari Most, were destroyed by the Croatian Defence Council. The Stari Most has since been rebuilt. Another symbol of the city, the monumental Serbian Orthodox Cathedral of the Holy Trinity, was shelled, set afire, and finally blown up by local Croat forces. The reconstruction of the church is ongoing as of 2020.

=== Croatia ===
- In the Independent State of Croatia, 450 Serb Orthodox churches and monasteries were destroyed along with monumental iconostases, thousands of icons, manuscripts, and books.
- During the Croatian War of Independence, thousands of cultural monuments and religious buildings were destroyed or looted, with the total damage estimated at 407 million DM.
- After Croatia gained independence, about 3,000 memorials dedicated to the anti-fascist resistance and the victims of fascism were destroyed.
- In September 1991, Croatian forces entered the memorial site of the Jasenovac Concentration Camp and vandalized the museum building. Exhibitions and documentation were destroyed, damaged, and looted.

=== Cyprus ===
Following Cypriot intercommunal violence, many Ottoman-era mosques were destroyed after the Turkish Cypriots left. A number of Greek orthodox churches were also destroyed in Turkish-occupied Northern Cyprus during the conflict.

=== Czech Republic ===
- The Old Town Hall in Prague was severely damaged by fire during the Prague uprising of 1945. The chamber where George of Poděbrady was elected King of Bohemia was devastated, the town hall's bell, the oldest in Bohemia, dating from 1313, was melted, and the city archives, comprising 70,000 volumes (most of which were transported to the outskirts of Prague due to the fear of bombardment), as well as historically priceless manuscripts, were destroyed.
- The Vinohrady Synagogue, one of Europe's largest synagogues, was destroyed during the Bombing of Prague.

=== Denmark ===
- Christiansborg Palace, the main residence of the Danish kings, was destroyed by fire in 1794.
- Hirschholm Palace, the summer residence of the Danish kings, was demolished in 1809–1813 after it played a role in the affair between Johann Friedrich Struensee and Queen Caroline Matilda of Great Britain in the 1770s.
- Frederiksborg Castle, residence and coronation castle of the Danish king, was severely damaged by fire in 1859.
- The Børsen, a 17th-century stock exchange building in Copenhagen, was partially destroyed in a fire on 16 April 2024, along with its iconic spire.

=== Estonia ===
During World War II, 98% of the town of Narva was destroyed due to Soviet bombing raids. Only three pre-war buildings, including the town hall, remain.

=== Finland ===
The 1827 Great Fire of Turku destroyed much of the city and large amounts of historically significant records.

=== France ===
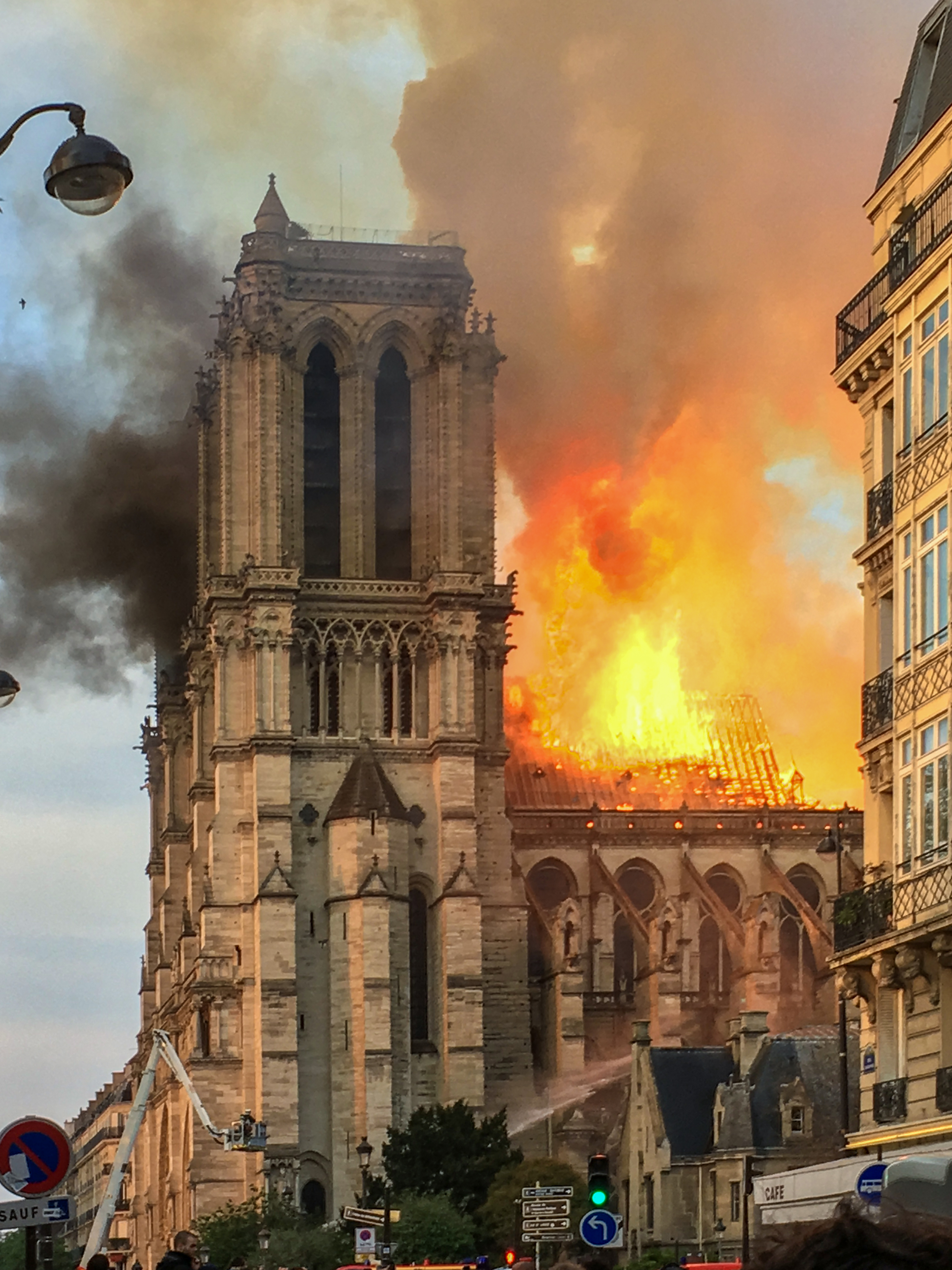
Notre-Dame de Paris on fire

- In the aftermath of the French Revolution, many historic structures, such as castles and monasteries, were destroyed by revolutionaries as tangible symbols of the ancien régime. Examples include the Bastille (rapidly demolished in 1789), Cluny Abbey (the largest church in Christendom when built, demolished between 1800 and 1810, and quarried for stone thereafter) and Jumièges Abbey.
- Most of the French Crown Jewels, including the famous Crown of Charlemagne, were melted down or destroyed during the French Revolution.
- During the Siege of Strasbourg at the height of the Franco-Prussian War in 1870, the total destruction by shelling and fire of the municipal library and the municipal art and archaeology collections resulted in the loss of 400,000 books, 3,446 medieval manuscripts, and thousands of incunables, as well as hundreds of paintings, stained glass windows, and archaeological artifacts. The most famous lost object was the original manuscript of the Hortus deliciarum.
- On 23 May 1871, the Tuileries Palace, which had been the usual Parisian residence of French monarchs, was almost entirely gutted in a fire set by members of the Paris Commune, leaving only the stone shell. It was subsequently demolished in 1883.
- The Château de Saint-Cloud was destroyed by Prussians during the Franco-Prussian War. Other destroyed palaces in France include the Château de Meudon and the Château de Bellevue.
- In 1914, Reims Cathedral was burned as a result of shelling during the initial phase of the First World War. The cathedral was rebuilt after the war.
- In 1917, Château de Coucy was blown up by the retreating Germans, destroying its important 13th-century donjon.
- The 1978 Palace of Versailles bombing severely damaged parts of the Palace of Versailles, including several priceless pieces of art. The palace was rebuilt and reopened to the public within four years.
- The roof of Notre-Dame de Paris, a major medieval Catholic cathedral, caught fire on 15 April 2019, severely damaging the cathedral's bell towers and resulting in the total collapse of the central spire and roof. The fire is believed to have been caused by the ongoing restoration, though an investigation is ongoing. Repairs to the building were completed in 2024, and the cathedral reopened in December of the same year.
- On 17 October 2026, Hôtel de Ville was partially destroyed by rioters in an arson attack.

=== Germany ===
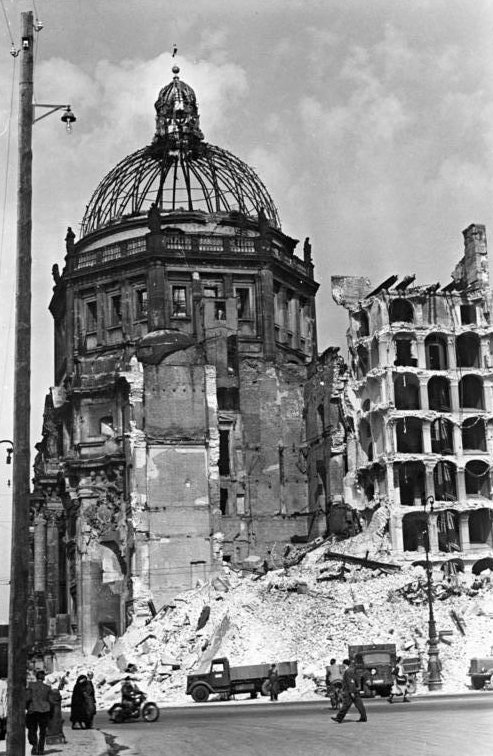
The remains of the Berlin Palace in 1950

- Several hundred cities were destroyed during World War II and the post-war period as a result of Allied area bombing of cities in the German Reich. Among the destroyed cultural heritage were Berlin Palace, Monbijou Palace, and City Palace, Potsdam, as well as churches like Dresden Frauenkirche, Berlin Cathedral, and Kaiser Wilhelm Memorial Church. Since the 1990s, all of the buildings mentioned above, with the exception of Monbijou Palace and Kaiser Wilhelm Memorial Church, have been rebuilt.
- Numerous synagogues throughout Germany were destroyed during the Nazi era (1933–1945), especially during or shortly after the November Pogroms of 1938. Their post-war reconstruction was hampered by the diminished Jewish community and, in some cases, by former Nazis remaining in local administrative positions and preventing rebuilding.
- Paulinerkirche, a medieval church from 1231 in Leipzig, survived the war practically unscathed but was dynamited in 1968 during the communist regime of East Germany. After the reunification of Germany, a new building in a contemporary style, the Paulinum, was built on the site.
- Much of Germany's industrial heritage, including railways, historic factories, and canals, has been destroyed. Very little of the Bavarian Ludwig Railway (Germany's first passenger steam railway) remains; the Ludwig-Donau-Main-Kanal was abandoned, and much of it was subsequently filled in to build German federal highway A73, and the historic Lehrter Bahnhof in Berlin was torn down to make way for the current Berlin Hauptbahnhof.
- Some important representative buildings of East Germany were demolished after reunification, most notably the Palast der Republik, where asbestos contamination was cited as a reason for demolition.
- The Duchess Anna Amalia Library in Weimar, containing numerous irreplaceable rare books, burned down in 2004.
- The building of the Historical Archive of the City of Cologne collapsed on 3 March 2009 during construction of an extension of the Cologne Stadtbahn.
- The Church of St. Lambertus in Immerath was demolished on 9 January 2018 as part of the demolition of the entire village to make way for an expansion of the Garzweiler surface mine.
- In October 2020, artworks displayed at museums on Museumsinsel in Berlin were vandalized with a liquid that left stains on the artifacts.

=== Greece ===
- The Colossus of Rhodes, one of the Seven Wonders of the Ancient World, was destroyed in the 226 BC Rhodes earthquake, and its remains were destroyed in the 7th century CE while Rhodes was under Arab rule.
- The Statue of Zeus at Olympia, also a Wonder of the Ancient World, was destroyed around the 5th century CE due to unknown causes.
- The Parthenon was extensively damaged by Ottoman occupiers from the 17th to the 19th century.
- Las Incantadas was demolished in 1864 by Emmanuel Miller, who attempted to transfer the entire monument to France. The building collapsed, though Miller managed to take the sculptures, which are now placed in the Louvre.

=== Hungary ===
Numerous historical buildings in Budapest were damaged or destroyed during World War II, including the Hungarian Parliament Building, the Chain Bridge, and the Sándor Palace.

=== Ireland ===
- During the Battle of Dublin at the beginning of the Irish Civil War in 1922, munitions were stored at the Four Courts building, which housed 1,000 years of Irish records in the Public Record Office. Under circumstances that are disputed, the munitions exploded, destroying much of Ireland's historical record.
- The Irish Republican Army followed a policy of deliberate destruction of Irish country houses.

=== Italy ===
- Many ancient Roman temples, statues, scrolls, buildings, and entire cities have been destroyed.
- In around 1505, Pope Pius II had the ancient St. Peter's Basilica demolished to make way for a replacement. The architect of the new building, Donato Bramante, also carelessly destroyed many of the tombs in the Basilica.
- Many historic gardens and villas were destroyed in Rome in the 19th century, including Villa Ludovisi and Villa Negroni.
- The Tower of Paul III and Convent of Aracoeli were demolished to make room for the Victor Emmanuel II Monument.
- Various historic buildings, for example the Castello di Villagonia and the Real Cittadella in Sicily, were demolished in the 19th and 20th centuries to make way for railways, industrial areas, or other modern buildings.
- Many historic buildings in Italy were destroyed or damaged during World War II. These include the monastery of Monte Cassino, which was destroyed during the Battle of Monte Cassino.
- Several historic buildings, books, paintings, and sculptures were destroyed during the 1966 flood of the Arno.
- Churches and other heritage sites were damaged or destroyed during earthquakes such as the 1997 Umbria and Marche earthquake, the 2009 L'Aquila earthquake, and the August 2016 Central Italy earthquake.

=== Kosovo ===
- During the Yugoslavia period, and especially the Kosovo conflict (1998–1999), mass destruction of Albanian heritage was endorsed by the state. Among the destroyed sites were mosques and other Islamic buildings, kulla dwellings (traditional stone tower houses), Ottoman-period architecture, public libraries, and more.
- A number of Serbian Orthodox religious sites were damaged or destroyed during World War II, the 1968 and 1981 protests and the NATO bombing in March–June 1999.
- Serbian cultural sites in Kosovo were systematically destroyed in the aftermath of the Kosovo War and 2004 ethnic violence. According to the International Center for Transitional Justice, this includes 155 destroyed Serbian Orthodox churches and monasteries as well as Medieval Monuments in Kosovo, which were inscribed on the List of World Heritage in Danger.

=== Malta ===
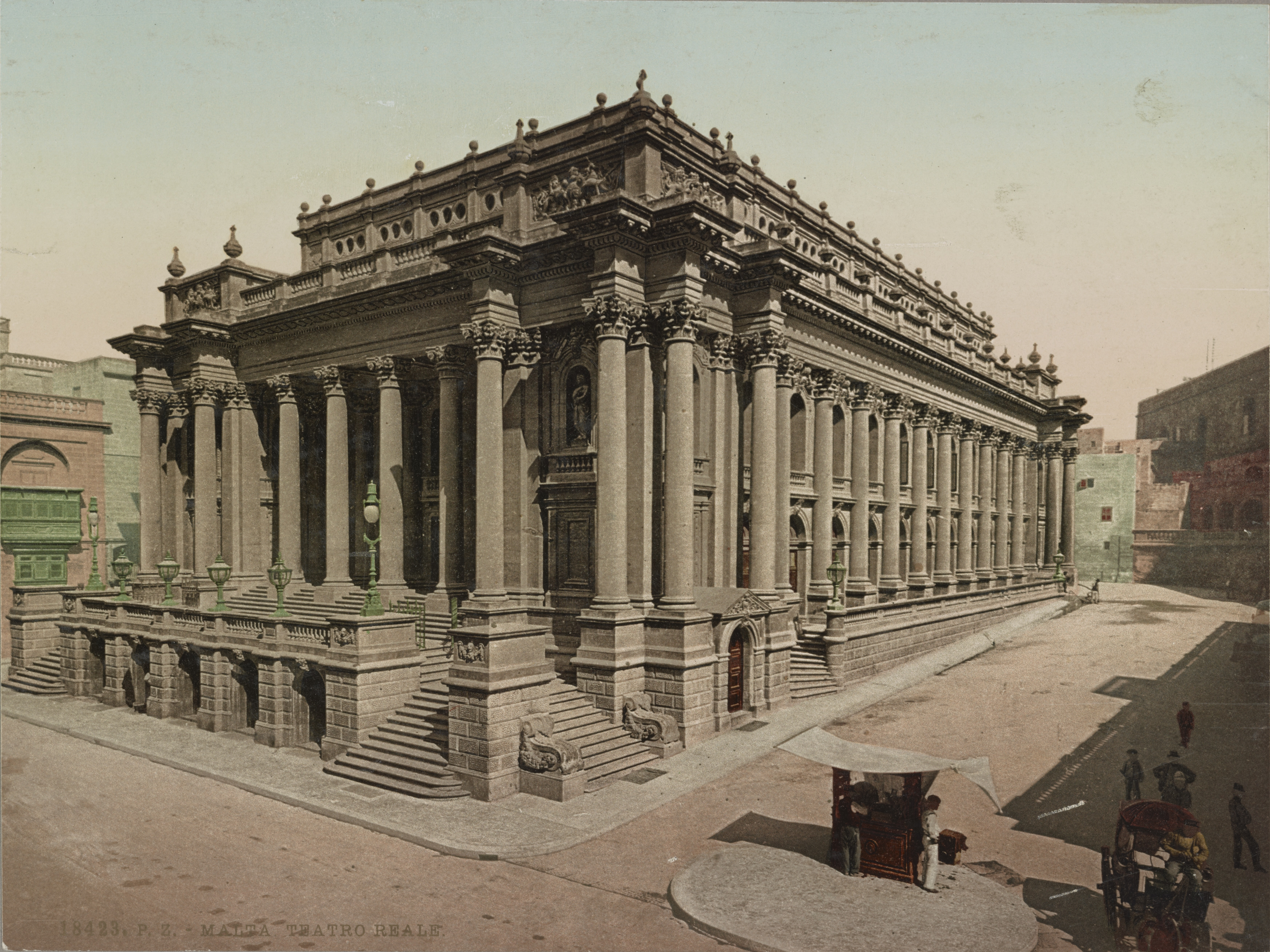

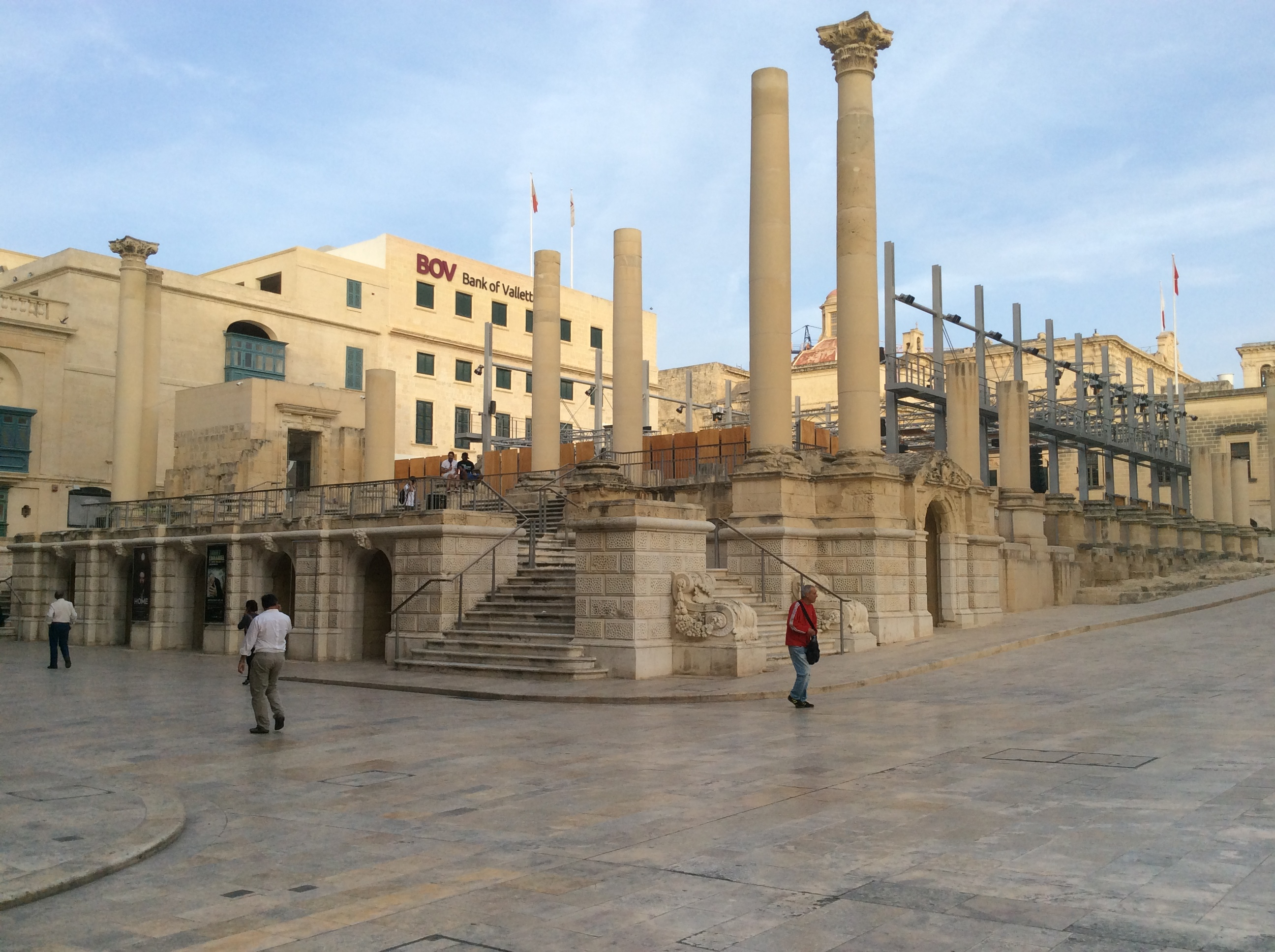
The Royal Opera House in Valletta in 1911, and its ruins in 2016. The building was destroyed by aerial bombardment in 1942.

- Parts of the megalithic Xagħra Stone Circle in Gozo were deliberately destroyed around 1834–1835, and its megaliths were broken down to form masonry used in the construction of a nearby farmhouse. The site was forgotten for over a century before being rediscovered in the late 20th century.
- A number of buildings of historical or architectural importance that had been included on the Antiquities List were destroyed by aerial bombardment during World War II, including Auberge d'Auvergne, Auberge de France, and the Slaves' Prison in Valletta, the Clock Tower, Auberge d'Allemagne and Auberge d'Italie in Birgu, and two out of three megalithic temples at Kordin. Others, such as Fort Manoel, also suffered severe damage but were rebuilt after the war.
- Other buildings that were not included on the Antiquities List but had significant cultural importance were also destroyed during the war. The most notable of these was the Royal Opera House in Valletta, which is considered to be "one of the major architectural and cultural projects undertaken by the British" by the Superintendence of Cultural Heritage.
- The Gourgion Tower in Xewkija, which was included on the Antiquities List, was demolished by American forces in 1943 to make way for an airfield. Many of its inscriptions and decorated stones were retrieved and are currently stored at Heritage Malta.
- Palazzo Fremaux was gradually demolished between 1990 and 2003. The demolition was condemned by local residents, the local government, and non-governmental organizations.
- The Azure Window, a 28-metre-tall (92 ft) limestone natural arch on the island of Gozo in Malta was one of Malta's major tourist attractions and was featured in several films. It was located in Dwejra Bay in the limits of San Lawrenz, close to the Inland Sea and Fungus Rock. The formation was anchored on the east end by the seaside cliff, arching over open water to a freestanding pillar in the sea to the west of the cliff. It was created when two limestone sea caves collapsed. Following years of natural erosion causing parts of the arch to fall into the sea, the arch and free standing pillar collapsed completely during a storm in March 2017.
- Villa St Ignatius, a 19th-century villa with historical and architectural significance, was partially demolished in late 2017. This was condemned by numerous non-governmental organizations and other entities.

=== Netherlands ===
- The German bombing of Rotterdam on 14 May 1940 decimated most of Rotterdam's historical city center.
- De Noord, a tower mill that had survived the Rotterdam Blitz, suffered a fire in July 1954 and was demolished soon after.

=== Norway ===
From 1992 to 1995, members of the Norwegian black metal scene began a wave of arson attacks on medieval Christian churches. By 1996 there had been at least 50 attacks.

=== Poland ===
Warsaw Old Town (including the Royal Castle and Warsaw New Town) as well as Łazienki Park (including the Łazienki Palace and Ujazdowski Castle) were destroyed by Nazi Germany in 1944 and later rebuilt from the 1950s to the 1980s.

=== Portugal ===
- Lisbon was almost completely destroyed during the 1755 Lisbon earthquake and the subsequent fire and tsunami.
- A small section of the 19th-century quarter Chiado was destroyed by fire on 25 August 1988. The eighteen damaged buildings were rebuilt in the following 20 years.

=== Romania ===
- The 60-meter-high tower of Rotbav fortified church, dating back to the 13th century, collapsed on 20 February 2016.
- Many historical buildings were demolished to construct the Centrul Civic in Bucharest.
- Old towns of Bacău, Bârlad, Câmpina, Galați, Orșova, Pitești, Ploiești, Râmnicu Vâlcea, and Suceava, among others, were completely demolished because of communist urban planning.
- The 1989 fire of the Central University Library in Bucharest destroyed over 500,000 books and 3,700 manuscripts, including those of famous Romanian writings such as Mircea Eliade's novel manuscripts.

=== Russia ===
- In Moscow alone, losses from 1917 to 2006 are estimated at over 640 notable buildings (including 150 to 200 listed buildings, out of a total inventory of 3,500). Some of the buildings disappeared completely, while others were replaced with concrete replicas.
- President Boris Yeltsin ordered the shelling of the White House, seat of the Russian government, during the 1993 Russian constitutional crisis, causing a large fire and considerable damage to the top floors.
- The figure of Mephistopheles on a building in St. Petersburg known as the House with Mephistopheles was smashed by a fundamentalist Orthodox group in 2015.
- The original buildings of the Metrowagonmash plant, founded by Savva Mamontov in 1897 and built in Russian Gothic style, were demolished between 2016 and 2019 to make way for block houses.

=== Serbia ===
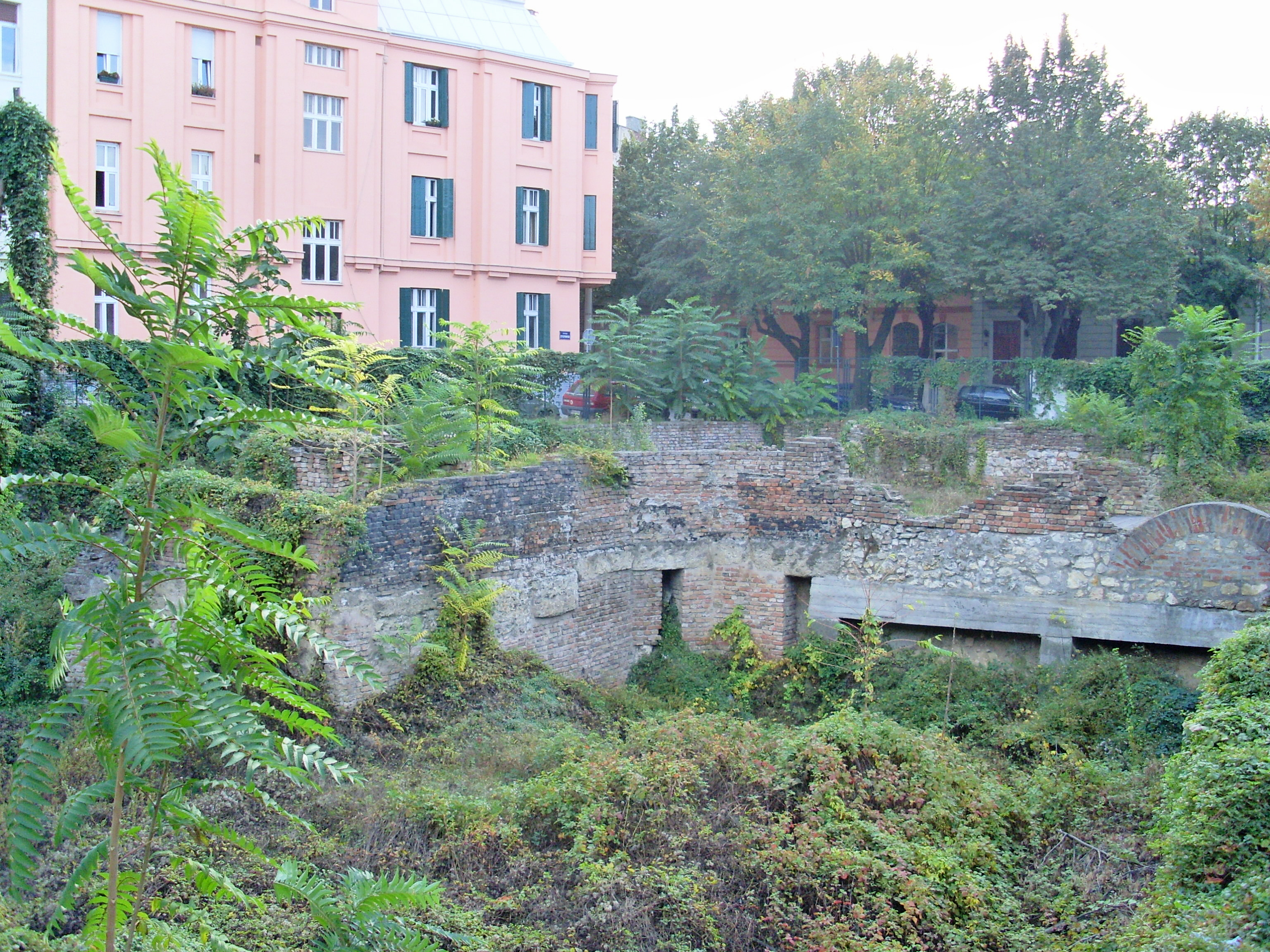
A photograph of the site of the National Library of Serbia, destroyed in 1941.

- The National Library of Serbia was bombed on 6 April 1941 on the order of Adolf Hitler. Around 500,000 volumes and all collections of the library were destroyed in what was one of the largest book bonfires in European history.
- A number of culturally significant buildings were destroyed in Belgrade during Operation Retribution, the Allied bombing of Yugoslavia in World War II, and other battles. Destroyed buildings include the King Alexander Bridge, Old Post Office, El Kal Synagogue, Beth Israel synagogue, and others.
- The Socialist Federal Republic of Yugoslavia demolished dozens of synagogues in Vojvodina after World War II, since preservation of religious buildings and relics wasn't considered important.
- The NATO bombing of Yugoslavia in 1999 resulted in partial destruction of many cultural monuments, including:
  - The Yugoslav Ministry of Defence building;
  - The University Hospital Center Dr Dragiša Mišović, founded in 1922;
  - The Avala Tower, one of the most iconic symbols of the Serbian capital;
  - Many medieval monuments, such as Gračanica Monastery, the Patriarchate of Peć monastery and the Visoki Dečani monastery, which are on UNESCO's World Heritage list today.

=== Slovenia ===
- Partisan forces and their successors destroyed approximately 100 castles and manors during and after the Second World War.
- An Allied raid heavily damaged Žužemberk Castle during the Second World War.
- Many churches were destroyed during and after World War II. A few examples include the churches in Ajbelj, Dragatuš, Dvor, Gabrje and Žužemberk.

=== Soviet Union ===
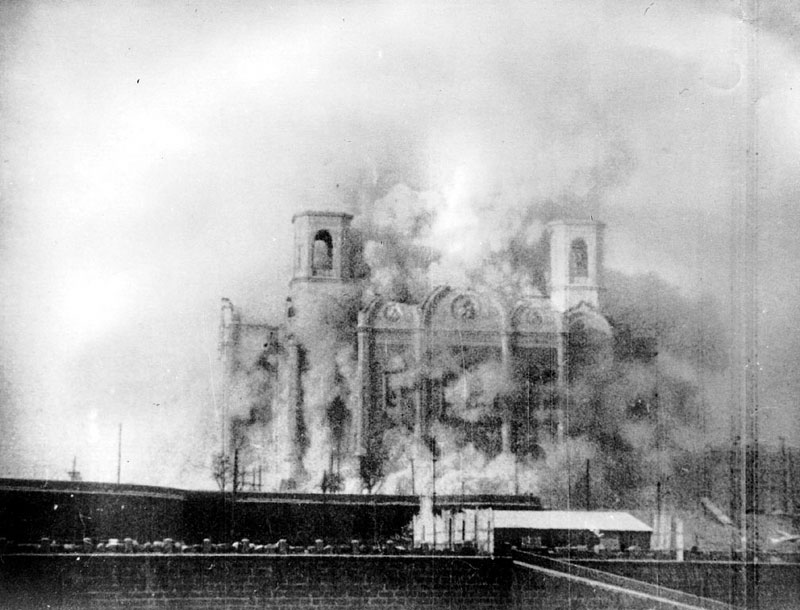
The Cathedral of Christ the Saviour being demolished in 1931

- During the deportation of the Chechens and Ingush from the USSR in 1944, their local cultural and societal heritage was destroyed. Placenames were replaced with Russian ones, mosques were demolished, villages were razed, and the historical Nakh language manuscripts were almost completely wiped out.
- After the deportation of the Crimean Tatars in May 1944, the Soviet government launched a detatarization campaign, which involved destruction of religious and cultural Tatar heritage.
- A new anti-religious campaign was launched in 1929, and the destruction of churches in the cities peaked around 1932. Several churches were demolished, including the Cathedral of Christ the Saviour in Moscow and St. Michael's Cathedral in Izhevsk. Both of these were rebuilt in the 1990s and 2000s.
- In 1959, Nikita Khrushchev launched his anti-religious campaign. By 1964, over 10,000 out of 20,000 churches were shut down, and many were demolished. Of 58 monasteries and convents operating in 1959, only 16 remained by 1964; of Moscow's 50 churches operating in 1959, 30 were closed and six demolished.

=== Spain ===
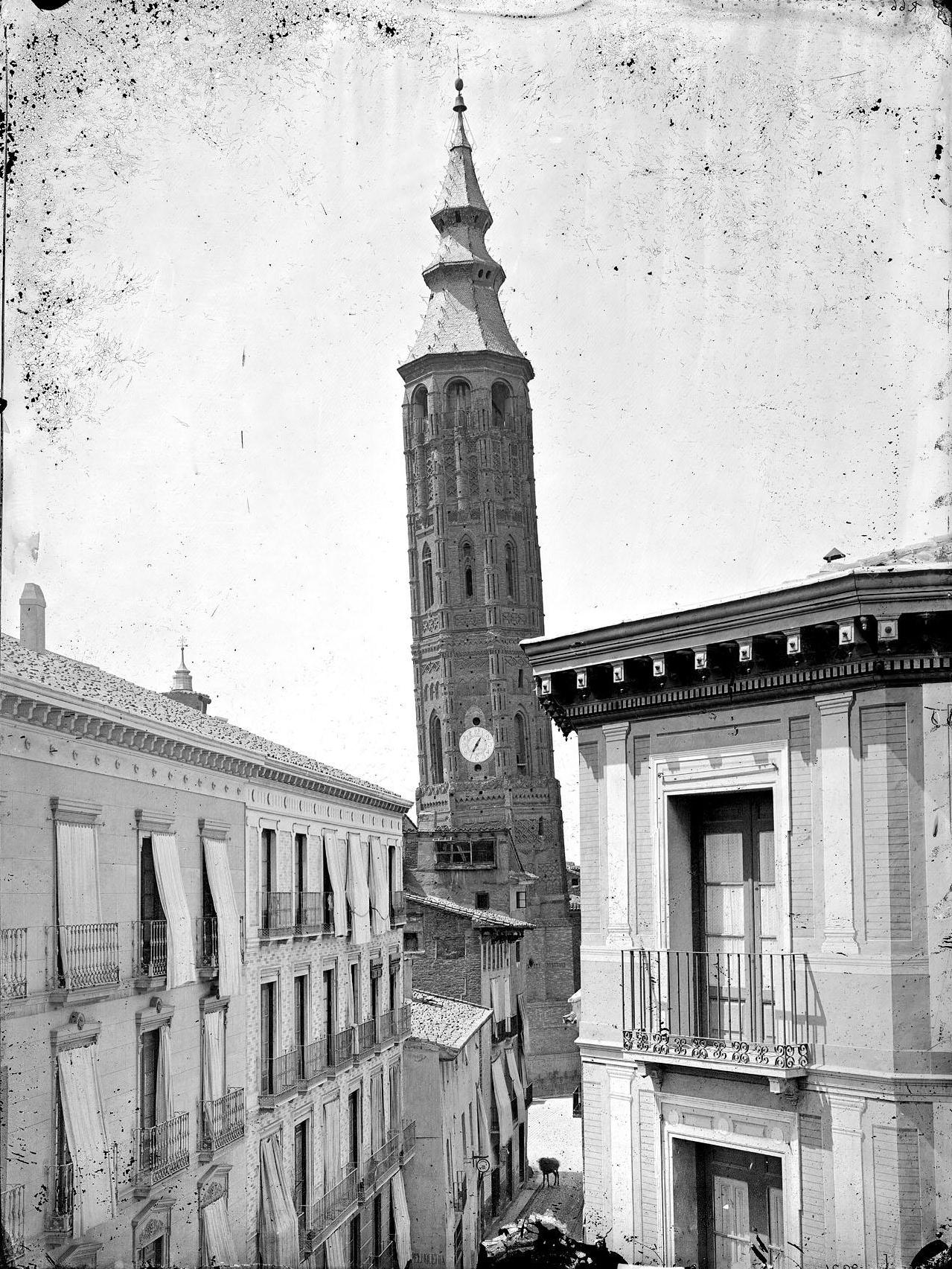
A photograph of Torre Nueva in Zaragoza in 1876

- Because of the Ecclesiastical confiscations of Mendizábal (secularization of church properties in 1835–1836), several hundred church buildings, monasteries, and civil buildings owned by the Church were partly or completely demolished. Among them were important buildings such as the Santa Caterina convent (the first Gothic building on the Iberian Peninsula) and the Sant Francesc convent, both in Barcelona, or San Pedro de Arlanza Roman monastery, near Burgos. Many of the artworks, libraries and archives contained therein were lost or pillaged while the buildings were abandoned.
- The Convent of Dominicos of San Pedro Mártir, Convent of Trinidad, Church of Santiago, Church of San Torcuato and Santa Lucía, and Church of San Miguel, all located in Calatayud, have been demolished.
- The Leaning Tower of Zaragoza was demolished in 1892 over concerns that it would topple.
- Palacio de los Lasso de Castilla was a 15th-century palace in Madrid that became the palace or residence of the Catholic Monarchs. It was demolished during the mid-19th century.
- Churches, monasteries, convents, and libraries were destroyed during the Spanish Civil War.
- A Virxe da Barca sanctuary was destroyed by a fire started by lightning.
- Iglesia de San Pío X, a church located in Todoque, Canary Islands, was destroyed by the 2021 Cumbre Vieja volcanic eruption on 26 September 2021.

=== Sweden ===
- Tre Kronor, the main residence of the Swedish kings, was destroyed by fire in 1697. Several important documents of the history of Sweden were lost.
- Klarakvarteren, a part of Stockholm from the 17th century, was demolished in the 1960s.
- The city of Norrköping was razed in 1719 by the Russians. It was reconstructed with grid-pattern streets and by using the surviving Johannesborg fort as a quarry.

=== Switzerland ===
- The city of Basel was devastated by the 1356 Basel earthquake.
- Pfäfers Abbey was destroyed in 1665 by fire.
- The Majoria and Tourbillon castles in Sion were destroyed by fire in 1788.
- Disentis Abbey was destroyed by fire in 1799, along with its library and archives.
- The Kapellbrücke (Chapel Bridge) in Luzern was substantially damaged by fire in 1993.

=== Ukraine ===
- Brotherhood Monastery was demolished by Soviet authorities in 1935.
- The original 10th-century Church of the Tithes was destroyed by Mongol forces in the Siege of Kiev (1240). A new church was built on the site in the 19th century, but it was destroyed by Soviet authorities in 1935.
- Great Suburb Synagogue was demolished by invading Nazi forces in 1941.
- Golden Rose Synagogue, the oldest synagogue in Ukraine, was sacked and demolished by the Nazi occupation forces between 1941 and 1942.
- Khreshchatyk, the main street of Kyiv containing many historic buildings, was heavily mined by retreating Soviet forces in 1941. As a result, most buildings were destroyed. Some buildings were restored after the war, but most were replaced with new structures in the style of Stalinist architecture.
- St. Michael's Golden-Domed Monastery was demolished by Soviet authorities from 1934 to 1936. Some frescoes and mosaics were removed and taken to museums in the Russian SFSR before demolition, and only a portion of them was returned when the cathedral was rebuilt in the 1990s.
- St. Nicholas Military Cathedral was demolished by Soviet authorities in 1934.
- A large amount of Ukrainian cultural heritage was lost or damaged in the 2022 Russian invasion of Ukraine.
  - The Antonov An-225 Mriya plane was severely damaged in 2022 during the Battle of Antonov Airport. The aircraft's owner, defense contractor Ukroboronprom, has announced that they will attempt to rebuild the aircraft.
  - Babi Yar Holocaust Memorial Center in Kyiv was damaged on 1 March 2022 during the Battle of Kyiv. The memorial complex, which was under construction at the time, suffered structural damage to a museum building as well as damage to the adjacent cemetery; other intrinsic elements of the site, including the memorial's synagogue and menorah sculpture, were not damaged.
  - The building of the Chernihiv Regional Youth Center was destroyed by a Russian air strike on 27 February 2022.
  - Artwork and stained glass in the Dormition Cathedral in Kharkiv were damaged in 2022 during the Battle of Kharkiv.
  - Ivankiv Historical and Local History Museum was destroyed on 27 February 2022 during the Battle of Ivankiv. The museum contained folk artwork, including paintings by Maria Prymachenko and textile works of Hanna Veres.
  - Kuindzhi Art Museum in Mariupol was destroyed on 21 March 2022 during the Siege of Mariupol. The museum was dedicated to the life and work of Ukrainian-born artist Arkhip Kuindzhi. Although the works by Kuindzhi held by the museum were reportedly removed from the building prior to its destruction, the current location of the artwork is unknown. The status of the remainder of the museum's collection, which included around 2,000 works by fellow Ukrainian artists Ivan Aivazovsky, Mykola Hlushchenko, Tetyana Yablonska, Mykhailo Derehus, and others, remains unknown as well.
  - The Slovo Building in Kharkiv was damaged in 2022 during the Battle of Kharkiv.
  - Transfiguration Cathedral in Odesa was severely damaged by a Russian air strike on 23 July 2023.

=== United Kingdom ===
==== 13th–17th centuries ====
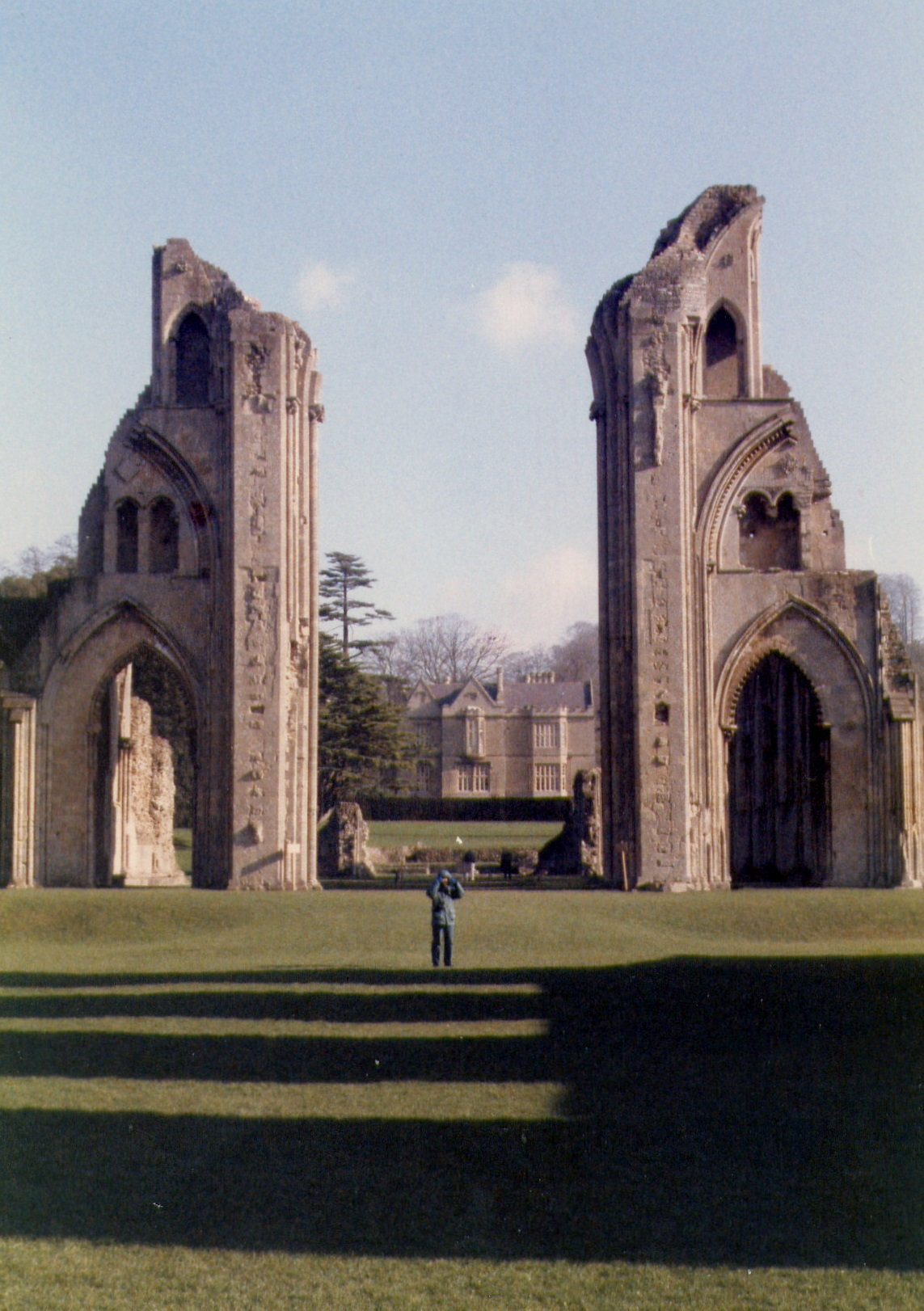
The ruins of Glastonbury Abbey

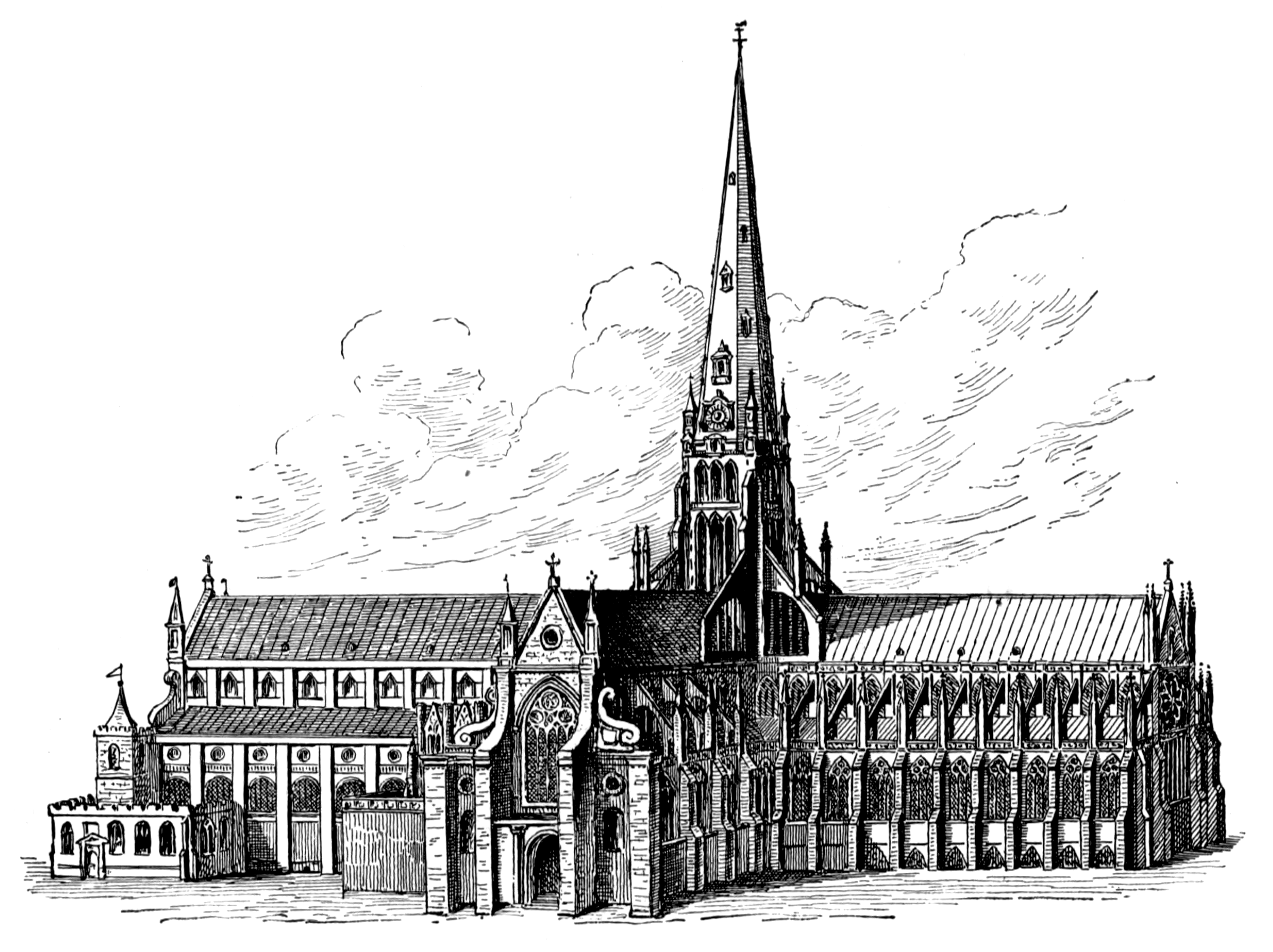
A drawing of Old St Paul's before its destruction

- Dunwich, the historic capital of East Anglia and a major port city of medieval England, has largely fallen into the sea due to gradual coastal erosion following two great storms in 1287. Eight churches present in the 13th century and 400 houses have been swept into the sea.
- Hastings Castle was originally built as a wooden motte-and-bailey castle in 1066, after William the Conqueror first landed in England, and was rebuilt as a stone fortified castle in 1070. It was dismantled at the order of King John, who feared it being taken by the French Dauphin Louis. It was then rebuilt and refortified by King Henry III around 1220 to 1225. In the South England flood of February 1287, the cliff supporting the castle's south wall collapsed due to a violent storm, causing a large portion of the wall to fall into the North Sea. In 1337 and 1339 the castle was attacked by French troops. The destroyed remains of the castle were excavated in the 1820s when the sandstone cliff was cut back to make room for the construction of the neoclassical Pelham Arcade. It last suffered damage as a target for bombs during World War II.
- The Dissolution of the Monasteries in the 1530s led to many monasteries, relics, and books being destroyed, for example the Glastonbury, Fountains, and Furness abbeys. In total, around 900 monasteries were closed. For a complete list of dissolved monasteries, see List of monastic houses in England and List of monastic houses in Wales.
- The abolition of chantries in 1547 and the conversion to Protestantism led to iconoclastic destruction of artwork in many churches.
- In the English Civil War, many castles and stately homes were destroyed in sieges (such as Old Wardour Castle), slighted, or demolished by the victorious Parliamentarians. This was done both to make them militarily untenable and as a symbolic destruction of the old order. Parliament could not afford to garrison all castles in England against Royalist insurgents, and an ungarrisoned castle could easily be used as a base by supporters of King Charles. This happened at Pontefract Castle, where the castle was left standing after the first civil war, was retaken by a party of Royalists, and had to be taken again in a lengthy siege. To prevent this recurring, the castle was thoroughly demolished. Raglan Castle was an example of punitive demolition—the Marquis of Worcester had held out long after every other castle except Pendennis. As punishment his castle was ransacked and, in contrast to the preservation of that at Oxford, his library was deliberately burnt. Examples of destroyed or damaged castles include Corfe, Winchester, Pembroke, Aberystwyth, Helmsley, Bolton, and Basing. The walls of the city of Coventry were also destroyed.
- The Great Fire of London in 1666 destroyed much of the old city, including Old St Paul's Cathedral, 87 parish churches, 44 company halls, the Royal Exchange, the Custom House, and the Bridewell Palace.
- The Palace of Whitehall, the main residence of the English and later British monarchs, was destroyed by fire in 1698.

==== 18th–20th centuries ====
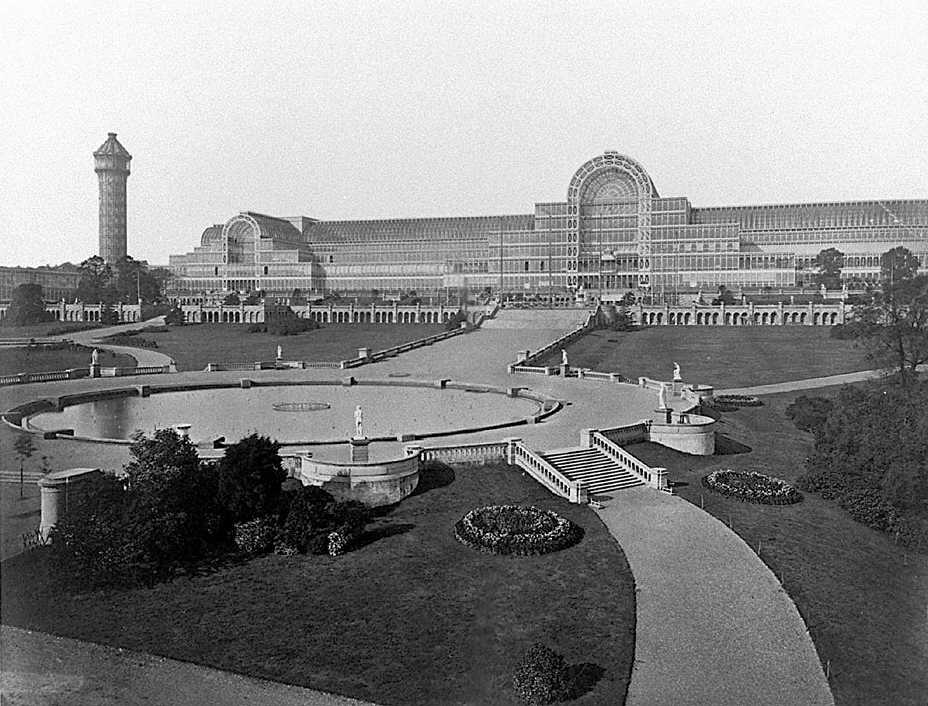
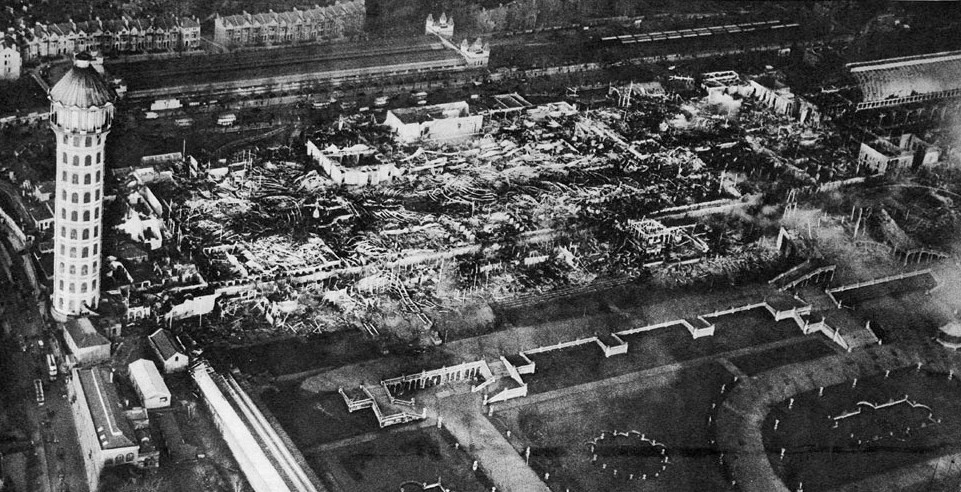
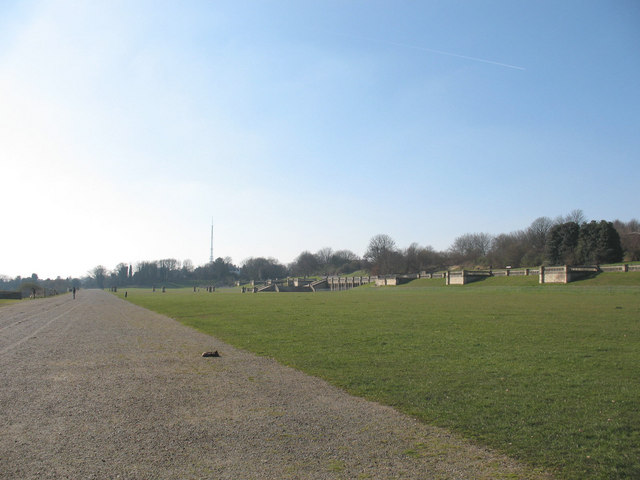
The Crystal Palace in London in 1854; its burnt-out ruins in 1936; and the site in 2008
- The Cotton library owned by Sir Robert Bruce Cotton was partly destroyed in a house fire in 1731, resulting in the loss of a number of important Late Antique and medieval manuscripts and serious damage to a number of others, including a copy of the Magna Carta. The surviving works are now held by the British Library.
- Arthur's O'on, a Roman temple or triumphal monument located near the Antonine Wall in Scotland, was demolished by a local landowner in 1743.
- St Mary's Church in Reculver, an exemplar of Anglo-Saxon architecture and sculpture, was partially demolished in 1809.
- The Palace of Westminster was almost destroyed by fire on 16 October 1834, and many documents about Britain's political history were lost. Only Westminster Hall, the crypt of St Stephen's Chapel, and the Jewel Tower survived.
- The Temple of the Sun, a Gothic folly in Kew Gardens designed by William Chambers in 1761, was destroyed when a nearby cedar tree fell on it in a storm in 1916.
- The Crystal Palace in London was destroyed by fire on 30 November 1936.
- St Michael's Church in Coventry was a 14th-century cathedral that was nearly destroyed by the German Luftwaffe during the Coventry Blitz of 14 November 1940. Only the tower, the spire, the outer wall, and the bronze effigy and tomb of its first bishop, Huyshe Yeatman-Biggs, survived. The ruins of this cathedral remain hallowed ground and are listed at Grade I.
- Charles Church in Plymouth was entirely burned out by incendiary bombs dropped by the Luftwaffe on the nights of 21 and 22 March 1941. It has since been encircled by a roundabout and turned into "a memorial to those citizens of Plymouth who were killed in air raids on the city in the 1939–45 war."
- Coleshill House, a historic mansion in Oxfordshire (historically Berkshire), was destroyed in a fire in 1952, and many historic items within were lost. The ruins were demolished in 1958.
- Several historic structures, such as the Euston Arch in London and the Royal Arch in Dundee, were demolished in the 1960s to make way for redeveloped infrastructure.
- Urban renewal in many historic cities, like Exeter, Coventry, and York, in the 1960s and 70s resulted in the destruction of many historic buildings to create roads that were believed to be more suitable for traffic.
- The Imperial Hotel, London, designed by Charles Fitzroy Doll and built from 1905 to 1911, was demolished in 1966–67.
- York Minster was severely damaged by fire in 1984, believed to have been caused by a lightning strike on the south transept.
- The Baltic Exchange in the City of London was destroyed by a bomb placed there by the Provisional IRA in 1992. The site is now occupied by The Gherkin, and the Baltic Exchange Memorial Glass can be seen in the National Maritime Museum.
- A major fire in 1992 caused extensive damage to Windsor Castle, the largest inhabited castle in the world.

==== 21st century ====
- The original Wembley Stadium was closed in October 2000 for redevelopment and was demolished from 2002 to 2003. The top of one of the Twin Towers was erected as a memorial in the park on the north side of Overton Close in the Saint Raphael's Estate.
- Clandon Park House, a historic mansion in Surrey, was severely damaged by fire on 29 April 2015, leaving the house "essentially a shell" and destroying thousands of historic items, including one of the footballs kicked across no-man's-land on the first day of the Battle of the Somme in 1916.
- The Royal Clarence Hotel in Exeter, considered England's oldest hotel, was almost destroyed by fire on 28 October 2016.
- The Mackintosh Building of the Glasgow School of Art was extensively damaged by fire in May 2014, including the destruction of the artistically significant Mackintosh Library. As restoration was completed and the building was nearing reopening, a far more devastating fire broke out on the night of 15 June 2018, destroying the building's interior. Alan Dunlop, the school's professor of architecture, said, "I can't see any restoration possible for the building itself. It looks destroyed."
- The Beehive Mills in Bolton, Lancashire, a Grade II listed building, was demolished in 2019 after the local authority agreed to build 121 new houses.
- The Crooked House, a historic 18th-century pub and former farmhouse in Staffordshire, was destroyed by fire in August 2023, and the ruins were demolished.

== North America ==
=== Belize ===
Several Maya sites, such as San Estevan and Nohmul, have been partly demolished. This has been done by contractors to illegally extract gravel for roadworks.

=== Canada ===
==== 17th–20th centuries ====
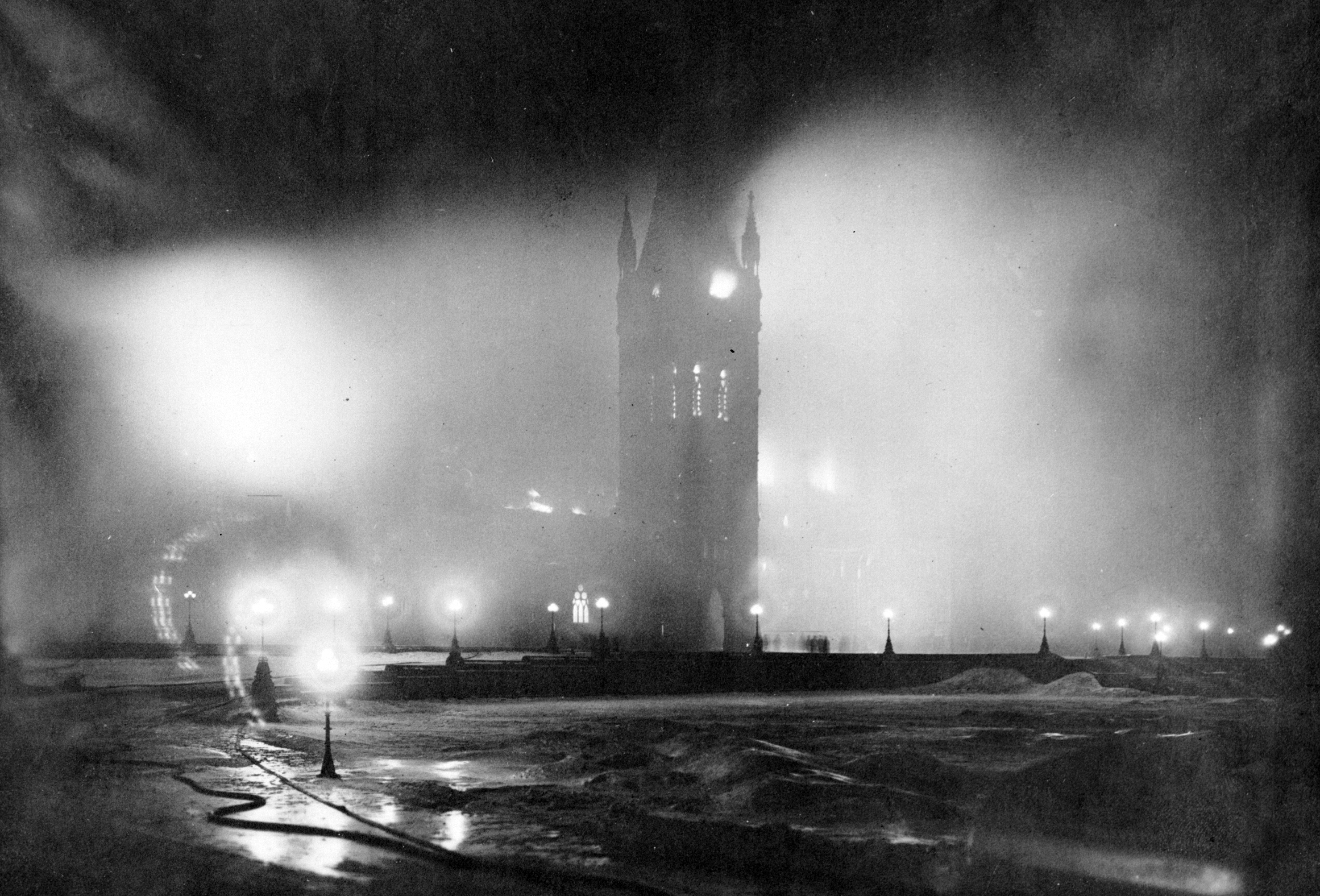
Centre Block on fire in 1916

- The 1620 Colony of Avalon was destroyed in 1696 in the Siege of Ferryland during King William's War.
- In 1696, the Cathedral of St. John the Baptist in St. John's, Newfoundland, was destroyed by the French under the command of Pierre Le Moyne d'Iberville. The present cathedral was extensively damaged in the Great Fire of 1892.
- The 1754 St. Matthew's United Church was destroyed by fire in 1857 and later rebuilt.
- In January 1839, St. James Anglican Church in Toronto was destroyed by a fire and rebuilt as St. James Cathedral by December 1839. This building was destroyed by another fire in 1849 and replaced by the current structure, the Cathedral Church of St. James, in 1853.
- Brock's Monument was heavily damaged after a bombing on 17 April 1840 and subsequently demolished. The monument was rebuilt in 1859.
- On the night of 25 April 1849, the Canadian Parliament buildings in Montreal were set on fire by Loyalist rioters. The resulting fire consumed the Parliament's two libraries, parts of the archives of Upper Canada and Lower Canada, as well as more recent public documents. Over 23,000 volumes, forming the collections of the two parliamentary libraries, were lost.
- Christ Church Cathedral in Montreal was destroyed in a fire in 1856 and later rebuilt in 1859.
- The 1665 Fort William in St. John's, Newfoundland, was demolished in 1881 to make room for the Newfoundland Railway.
- The 1881 St. James Anglican Church in Vancouver was destroyed by a fire in 1886 and only rebuilt after 1935 (completed in 1937).
- Knox Presbyterian Church in Toronto was severely damaged by fire in 1895 and eventually relocated in 1909.
- Crystal Palace in Montreal was destroyed by fire in 1896.
- Centre Block of Parliament Hill in Ottawa was destroyed by fire on 3 February 1916 and immediately rebuilt.
- The Church of Nativité-de-la-Sainte-Vierge-d'Hochelaga was rebuilt in 1921 after fire destroyed the original 1877 church.
- Montreal City Hall was gutted by fire in 1922 and rebuilt by 1932.
- Church of the Ascension in Windsor was destroyed by fire in 1926 and rebuilt in 1927. It burned down again in 1990 and was repaired the same year.
- Metropolitan United Church was destroyed by fire in 1928 and rebuilt in 1929 to match the original 1874 building.
- Saint Boniface Cathedral in Winnipeg, built in 1830, was destroyed by fire in 1860, rebuilt in 1862, relocated in 1906, and destroyed by fire again in 1968. The current cathedral was rebuilt in 1972.
- Saint-Jacques Cathedral in Montreal was destroyed by three fires in 1852, 1858, and 1933. The last rebuilt church was mostly demolished after 1973, with only the entrance preserved as Pavillon Judith-Jasmin for the Université du Québec à Montréal.

==== 21st Century ====
- The Old Government House, built in 1876, was burned down in an arson attack in 2003.
- St. Jude's Cathedral was destroyed by arson in 2005, along with Inuit art and artifacts.
- The Quebec City Armoury, built 1885–1888, was mostly destroyed by a fire in 2008 and rebuilt by 2016.
- St. Anne's Anglican Church was destroyed by fire in June 2024.
- St. Mary & St. George Anglican Church in Jasper was destroyed by the Jasper wildfire on 24 July 2024.
- At least 24 churches were burned down in arson attacks between May 2021 and December 2023 following reports of mass graves of Indigenous children across the country.
- Built in 1921, the Notre-Dame-des-Sept-Allégresses church in Québec burned down in October 2024.

=== Guatemala ===
- Iglesia del Carmen, a colonial church in Antigua, was damaged by several earthquakes.
- The convent of Santa Clara in Antigua was severely damaged during the earthquakes, including the 1773 Guatemala earthquake.
- Tikal Temple 33 was destroyed in the 1960s by archaeologists to uncover earlier phases of construction of the pyramid.

=== Haiti ===
Much of Haiti's heritage, including the National Palace and the Port-au-Prince Cathedral, was damaged or destroyed in the 2010 Haiti earthquake.

=== Honduras ===
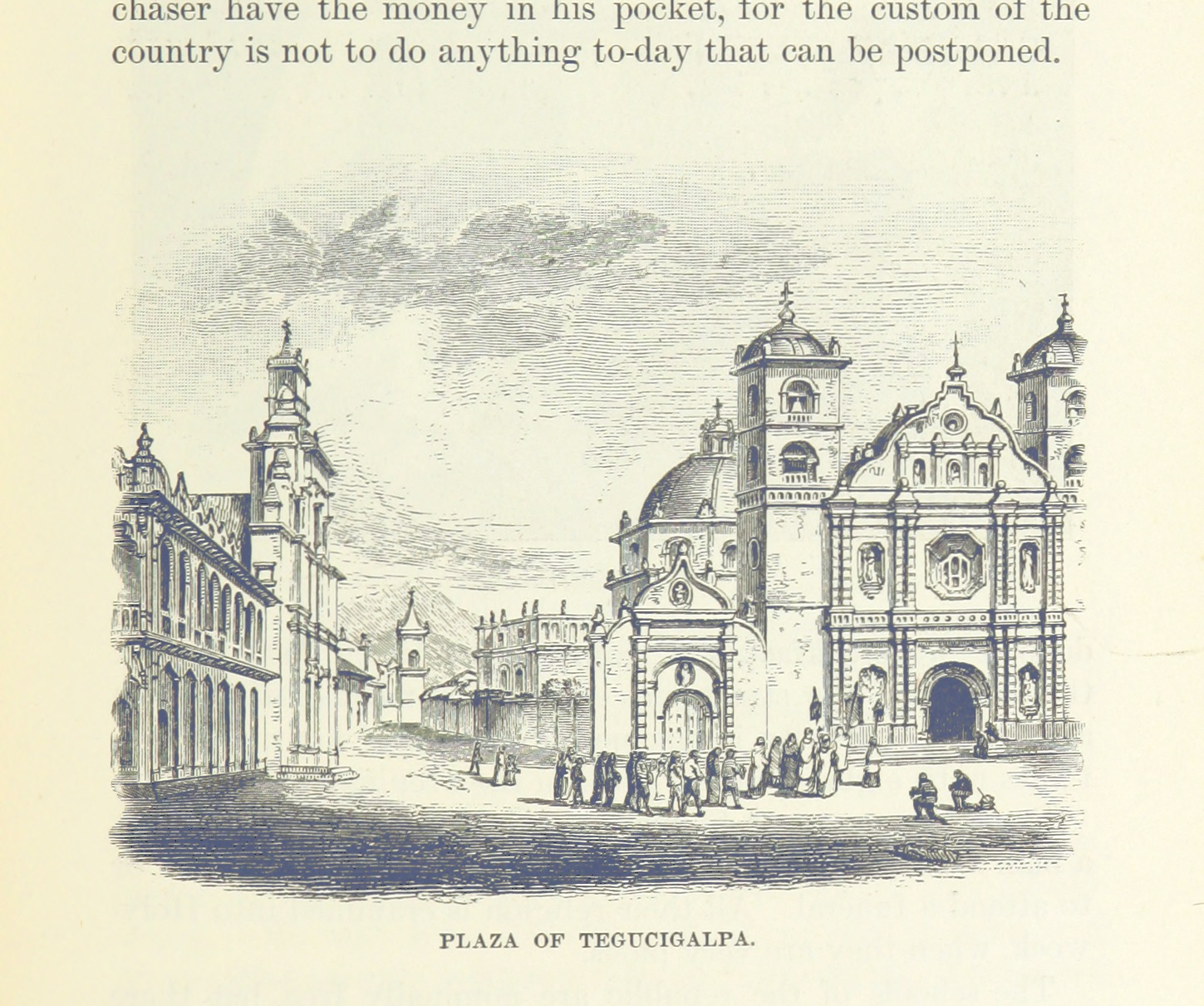
The church of La Limpia de la Inmaculada Concepción (on the left)

- The Catholic church of La Iglesia de Nuestro Señor de los Reyes in Comayagua was built in 1555. It was damaged by an earthquake in 1808, and the mayor's office ordered it demolished in 1829.
- The church of Santa Lucia de Jeto in Comayagua was built in 1558 and collapsed in 1808 after an earthquake.
- The Catholic church of La Limpia de la Inmaculada Concepción in Tegucigalpa was built in 1621. It suffered a fire in 1746, after which regular use stopped. It was finally demolished in 1858 due to its poor condition.
- The colonial-era Caxa Real in Comayagua was heavily damaged due to earthquakes; it remained in ruins until it was rebuilt and reopened in 2013.
- Tenampúa, a ceremonial center of the Lenca culture from the classic Mesoamerican period, was heavily damaged during the Second Honduran civil war in 1924.
- The choir of the Immaculate Conception cathedral was demolished in 1930 due to the amplification of the cathedral and possible poor preservation conditions of the structure.
- The original National Bank of Honduras was a Renaissance-style building located in the central park of Tegucigalpa, built during the late 19th century. It was demolished during the 1970s and replaced by a new building that houses government offices.
- Castillo Bográn is an abandoned 19th-century historical building in Santa Bárbara that belonged to President Luis Bográn. The building has deteriorated extensively due to heavy rains, hurricanes, and wind. Only 30% of the original structure is currently intact.
- Salitrón Viejo, an archaeological site of the Lenca culture, was submerged in water after the construction of the El Cajon dam.
- In April 2009, a fire at the museum of Saint Agustín College destroyed several pieces of art dating from the Spanish colonial era, including paintings made in Spain and relics that had belonged to national heroes.
- On 30 November 2017, a fire damaged the Museo del Hombre in Tegucigalpa. Several pieces were saved but suffered extensive damage.
- On 12 March 2019, a fire in the Museum of the Palace of Telecommunications in Tegucigalpa destroyed 30% of the collection and caused damage to other portions.

=== Mexico ===
The Chapel of the Christ, San Pablo del Monte, an 18th-century chapel in Tlaxcala, was burned down on 25 July 2015 in an act of arson.

=== Nicaragua ===
- Much of the historic downtown of Managua was destroyed by two earthquakes in the 20th century—one in 1931 and a second, more devastating one, in 1972. Reconstruction efforts after the 1972 earthquake were marred by corruption in the Anastasio Somoza Debayle regime, and much of what could have been saved was lost to graft, incompetence, and an ideology of "redesigning" the capital according to then-prevalent ideas of city planning.
- The Nicaraguan Revolution and subsequent the Contra War led to the destruction of cultural heritage, for example the colonial-era fortress of San Carlos was destroyed during an FSLN-led commando raid on the Somocista prison housed in the building

=== United States ===
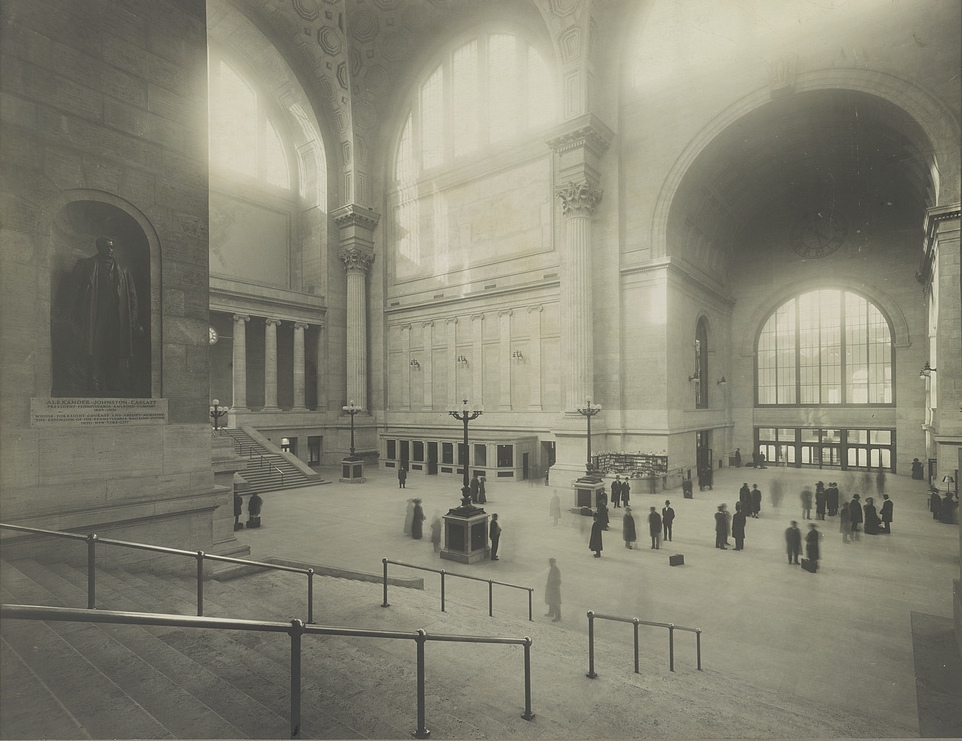
The main waiting room of New York City's Pennsylvania Station c. 1911. The station was largely demolished in 1963.

- Pennsylvania Station was a Beaux-Arts-style "architectural jewel" of New York City. Controversially, the above-ground portions of the station were demolished in 1963 to make way for construction of the Madison Square Garden arena, which opened in 1968.
- The architecturally significant Beaux-Arts Singer Building in New York City, briefly the tallest building in the world from 1906 to 1908, was demolished between 1967 and 1969.
- Numerous landmarks designated in the National Historic Landmark (NHL) program or the National Register of Historic Places (NRHP) have been destroyed.
  - Losses by flood and wind damage include:
    - The Old Blenheim Bridge, the longest-surviving covered bridge in the United States, was built in 1855 and destroyed by Hurricane Irene-related flooding in 2011.
    - Numerous NRHP-listed coastal properties in Mississippi and Louisiana were destroyed or significantly damaged by Hurricane Katrina in 2005.
  - Losses by fire or arson include:
    - Leesylvania (plantation), built c. 1750, was largely destroyed by fire in 1790.
    - The Russian-built Fort Ross Chapel, pre-1841, was destroyed in 1970 and subsequently reproduced.
    - The National Personnel Records Center fire of 1973 destroyed about 80% of the military personnel records held at the National Personnel Records Center in St. Louis, MO.
    - The Provo Tabernacle was destroyed in a fire on 17 December 2010. It was subsequently rebuilt as the Provo City Center Temple, dedicated in 2016.
    - On 30 May 2020, multiple historical documents and artifacts were damaged or destroyed when the Memorial to the Women of the Confederacy was attacked by rioters in Richmond, Virginia.
    - On 15 May 2025, Nottoway Plantation, the largest antebellum mansion in the southern United States by square footage, was destroyed in a fire.
  - Losses by permitted processes include:
    - The Edwin H. Armstrong House in Yonkers, New York, was demolished in 1983.
    - The Army Medical Museum and Library in Washington, D.C., built in 1887, was demolished in 1969.
    - The ruins of Leesylvania were demolished in the 1960s to make way for a road.
    - In 1989, all 24 buildings of the Jobbers Canyon Historic District were demolished for development, representing the largest National Register historic district loss to date.
    - NASA wind tunnels, including the Eight-Foot High Speed Tunnel (1936–2011) and Full Scale 30-by 60-Foot Tunnel (1936–2010), have been demolished.
  - Ships broken up include:
    - Wapama (steam schooner) (1915–2013), scrapped, though documented by the Historic American Engineering Record throughout its dismantling.
    - President (steamboat) (1924–2009), disassembled.
- Multiple covered bridges have been lost, including:
  - Dooley Station Covered Bridge (1917–1960), arson; replaced by relocation of the 1856-built Portland Mills Covered Bridge.
  - Bridgeton Covered Bridge (1868–2005), arson; replaced by a replica.
  - Jeffries Ford Covered Bridge (1915–2002), arson.
  - Welle Hess Covered Bridge No. S1 (1871–1981), collapsed; partially reproduced off-site.
  - Whites Bridge (1869–2013), arson.
  - Babb's Bridge (1840/43/64–1973), arson; replaced by a replica.
  - Honey Run Covered Bridge (1886–2018), destroyed during the 2018 Camp Fire.
- In 2014, a 4,500-year-old Coast Miwok Indian burial ground and village was found near Larkspur, California, and destroyed to make way for a multimillion-dollar housing development.
- Rich Bar in Plumas County, California, was a ghost town dating back to the California Gold Rush, whose history was documented by Louise Clappe in her famed Shirley Letters. One notable building, the Kellogg House, still contained original furnishings from the 1800s and was continuously inhabited by Eva Eyraud from 1888 until 1977. Plans to refurbish the house were thwarted when it was destroyed in the Dixie Fire on 23 or 24 July 2021.
- The Georgia Guidestones were heavily damaged in a bombing on 6 July 2022 and demolished completely later that same day.
- In the course of constructing the Interstate Highway System through central areas of many cities and towns, much of their historic architecture was destroyed to accommodate the new roads. Only with the freeway revolts of the 1960s and 1970s did the process slow down. Other buildings were destroyed to make room for surface parking lots demanded by mandatory parking minimums or the desires of business owners. Big-box stores also led to a withering of smaller-scale retail and, in many cases, the abandonment and subsequent demolition of the buildings that formerly hosted such businesses.
- Much of the tangible and intangible cultural heritage of Native Americans was deliberately or accidentally destroyed in the course of the Native American genocide. The system of residential schools in many cases broke oral tradition and led to language death or severe language decline. The latter was openly admitted policy for decades under the slogan "Kill the Indian, Save the Man".
- The East Wing of the White House was partially demolished for the construction of a new ballroom on the orders of Donald Trump.

== Oceania ==
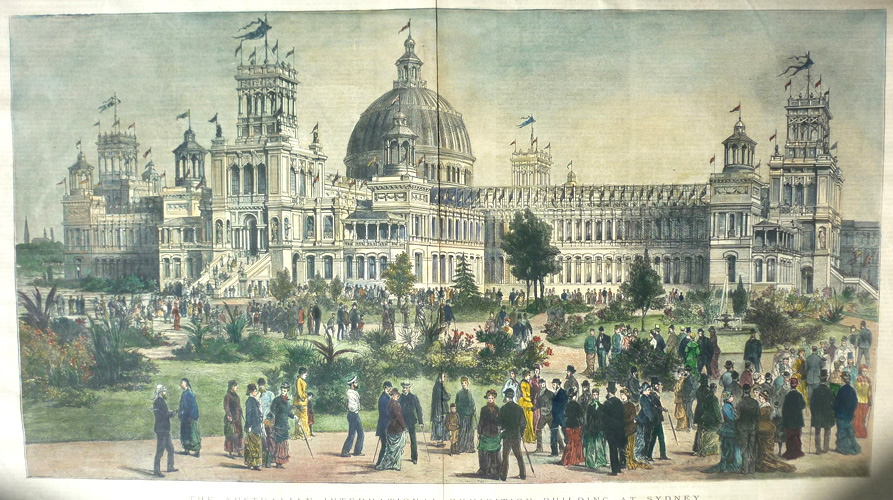
Garden Palace at the Sydney International Exhibition (1879)

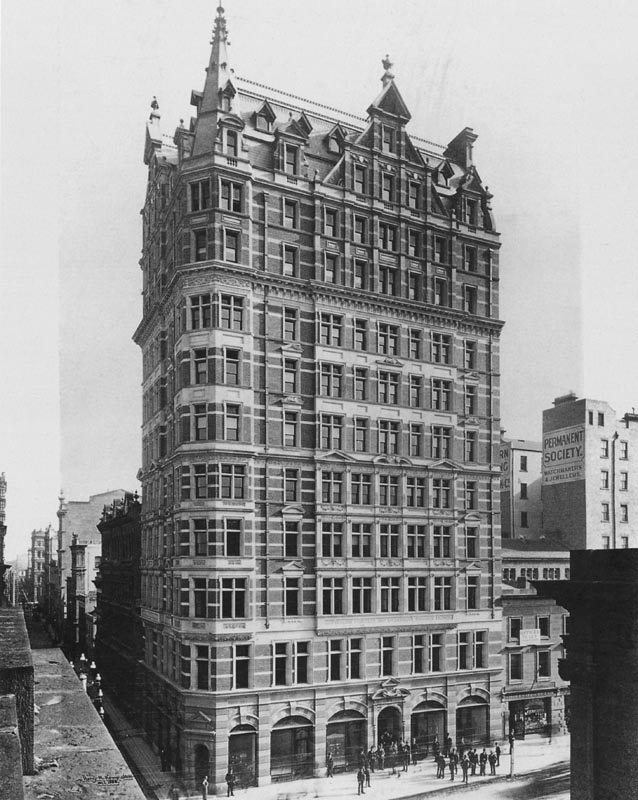
The APA Building, Melbourne

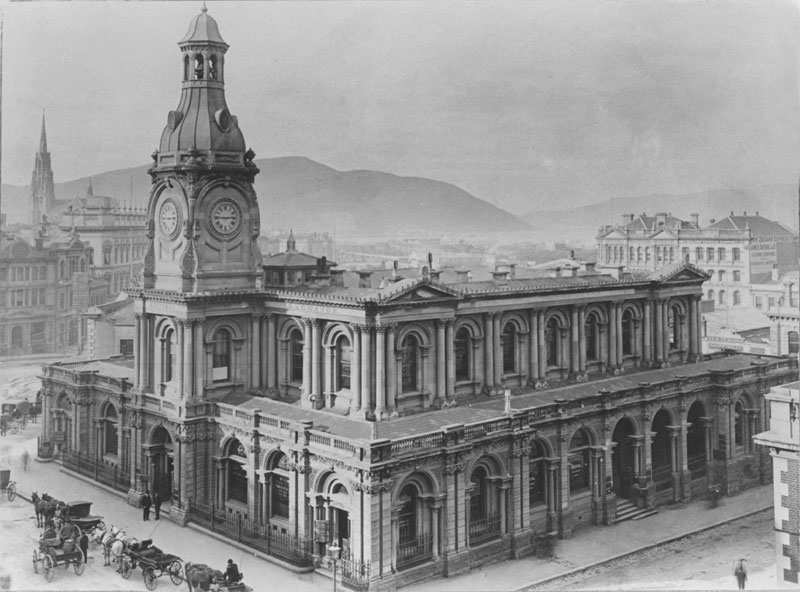
Exchange Building, Dunedin

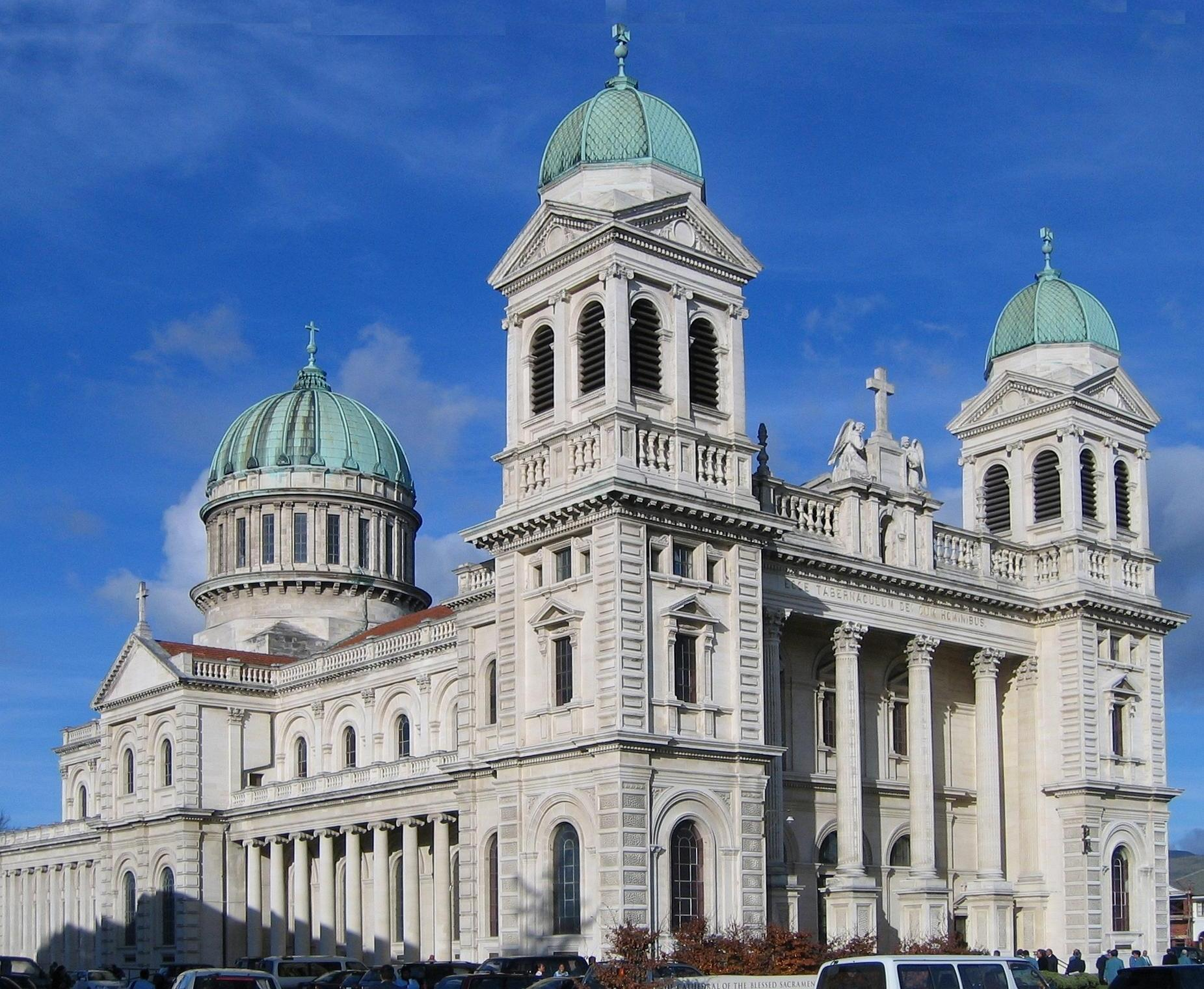
Cathedral of the Blessed Sacrament, Christchurch, demolished in 2021

=== Australia ===
- The Garden Palace in Sydney was destroyed by fire on 22 September 1882.
- The original Her Majesty's Theatre in Sydney was demolished in June 1933 to make way for a Woolworths retail store.
- The Gaiety Theatre in Melbourne was demolished in 1934.
- The Jubilee Exhibition Building in Adelaide was demolished in 1962. It hosted the Adelaide Jubilee International Exhibition of 1887.
- St Patrick's College, East Melbourne in Melbourne was demolished in the early 1970s.
- The Federal Coffee Palace in Melbourne was demolished in 1971.
- The APA Building, also in Melbourne, was demolished in 1980.
- The Bellevue Hotel in Brisbane was demolished on 20 April 1979 by the Bjelke-Petersen Queensland State government amid mass protest.
- The Cloudland Dance Hall in Brisbane was demolished in 1982 to make way for an apartment complex.
- The Regent Theatre in Sydney was demolished in 1988.
- Tasmanian Aboriginal cave paintings, believed to be 800–8,000 years old, were vandalized in 2016.
- Juukan Gorge cave, a site of Aboriginal cultural significance in the Pilbara region of Western Australia, containing artifacts estimated to be 46,000 years old, was destroyed by the mining company Rio Tinto.
- The establishment of the Karratha Gas Plant, operated by Woodside Energy on behalf of the North West Shelf joint venturers, saw the destruction of approximately 5,000 rock art sites and motifs (petroglyphs).

=== New Zealand ===
- The Exchange Building in Dunedin was demolished in 1967 to make way for new office buildings.
- The Cathedral of the Blessed Sacrament in Christchurch was demolished in 2021 by order of Bishop Paul Martin following damage in the 2010 and 2011 Canterbury earthquakes. The cathedral was listed as a Category I heritage building.
- The Anglican Christ Church Cathedral was severely damaged in the 2010 and 2011 Christchurch earthquakes. Demolition was planned and partially carried out before being stopped entirely in 2012 after government concerns. In 2017 it was announced that the church would be reinstated.
- Cranmer Court, Christchurch, was demolished in 2012 after suffering damage owing to the 2011 Canterbury earthquake.

== South America ==
=== Argentina ===
- Several grand buildings in Buenos Aires were demolished over the years, including Pabellón Argentino, Grand Hotel, Ortiz Basualdo Palace, Unzué Palace, Odeón Theater, Coliseo Theater, and various palaces on Avenida Alvear.
- In 1935, the old church of San Nicolás of Bari was demolished to make way for 9 de Julio Avenue. The church was later rebuilt in a different location.
- In response to the Bombing of Plaza de Mayo in 1955, several churches in Buenos Aires were burned and looted, including Santo Domingo convent, St. Ignatius Church, Basilica of San Francesco, St. Michael's Church, and Basilica of Saint Nicholas of Bari. The ornate building of the Jockey Club was also destroyed.
- Historic buildings in the city of San Juan, including the cathedral and the government house, were destroyed by the 1944 San Juan earthquake.
- The 1773 Marquez Bridge over the Reconquista River was renovated and declared a National Historic Monument of Argentina in 1964. In 1997, it was demolished by Autopistas del Oeste.
- On 18 October 1977, a fire burned the Teatro Argentino to the ground in La Plata. The building was later rebuilt, but in a different style.
- On 3 April 1979, a fire destroyed about half of the Hotel Castilla along Avenida de Mayo. The ornate Avenida Theatre housed inside survived intact, but the destroyed portions of the building have not been rebuilt.

=== Brazil ===
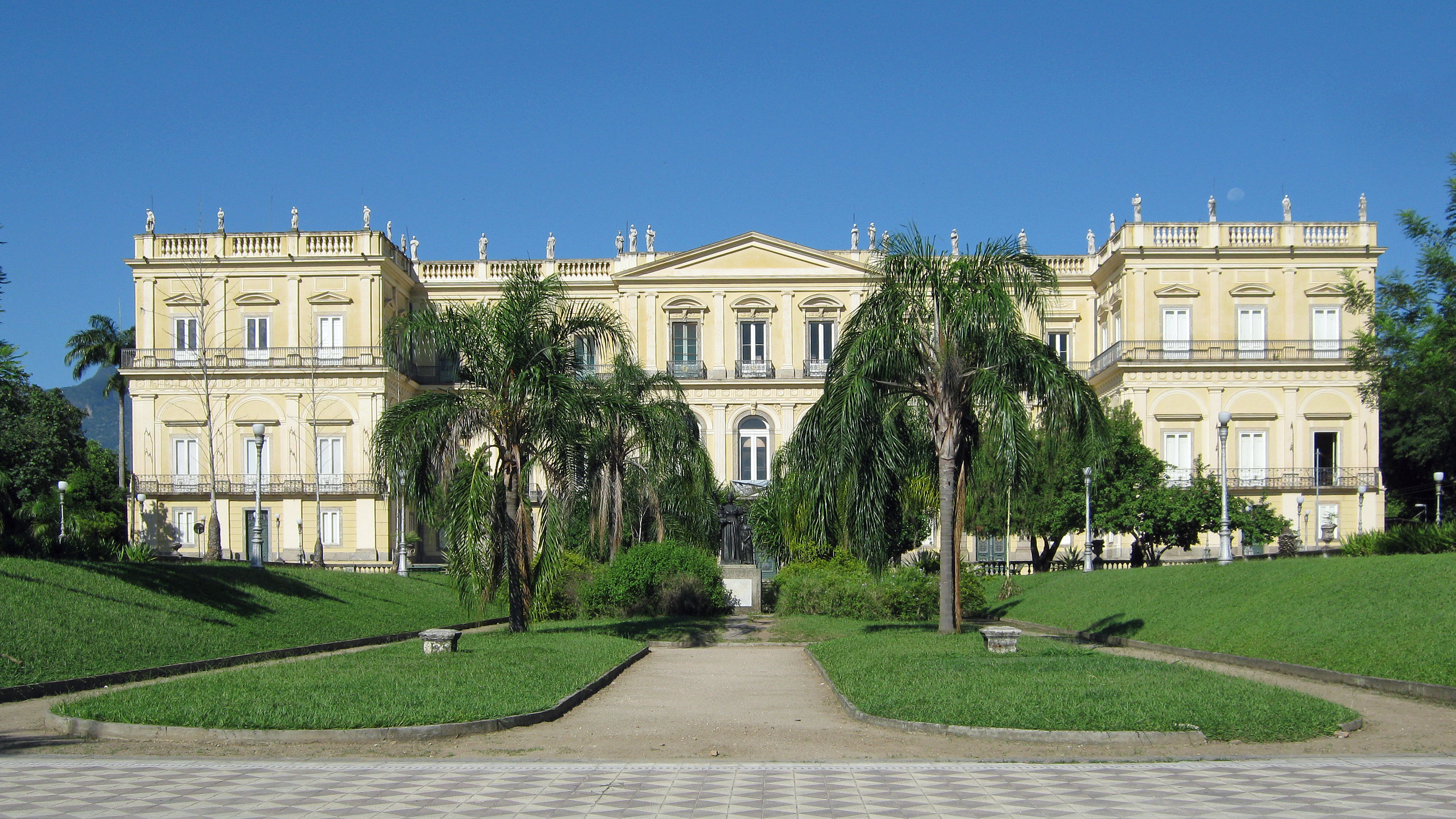
The main building of the National Museum of Brazil in 2011, before it was destroyed by a fire

- On 8 July 1978, the Museum of Modern Art of Rio de Janeiro was destroyed by fire.
- On 17 May 2010, the natural history collection of the Instituto Butantan was destroyed by fire.
- On 2 September 2018, the National Museum of Brazil was destroyed by fire.

=== Peru ===
An Incan quipu

Many of the quipu, an Andean system of encoding information in ropes via color and knots used by the Inca and other civilizations, have been lost to decay of organic material and deliberate destruction. The knowledge of reading quipu was still present well into the colonial era but has since been lost.

=== Uruguay ===
On 16 July 1969, an original Flag of the Treinta y Tres from the Cisplatine War was stolen from the history museum by a revolutionary group called OPR-33. The historical flag was last seen in 1975 in Buenos Aires but has been considered missing since the day of its theft.

=== Venezuela ===
On 17 October 2004, the fire in the Parque Central Complex destroyed the tower's planoteca, an archive containing the entire history of the country's public building plans spanning two centuries, including aqueduct and sewer systems.

== See also ==
- Art destruction
- Book burning and list of book-burning incidents
- List of destroyed libraries
- List of landmarks destroyed or damaged by climate change
- List of missing treasures
- List of World Heritage in Danger
- Lost work, lost artworks and list of lost films
- Slighting
- Virtual heritage
- World Monuments Fund

== Sources ==
- Gaya Nuño, Juan Antonio. La arquitectura española en sus monumentos desaparecidos. Madrid, Espasa-Calpe, 1961.
- Herscher, Andrew (2010). Violence taking place: The architecture of the Kosovo conflict. Stanford: Stanford University Press. ISBN 9780804769358.
- Mileusnić, Slobodan (1997). Spiritual Genocide: A survey of destroyed, damaged and desecrated churches, monasteries and other church buildings during the war 1991–1995 (1997). Belgrade: Museum of the Serbian Orthodox Church.
- Williams, Thomas J. T. (2012). "A Blaze in the Northern Sky: Black Metal and Crimes Against Culture". Public Archaeology. 11 (2): 59–72. doi:10.1179/1465518712Z.0000000006. S2CID 145058950.
- Давидов, Динко (2015). Independent State of Croatia: Total Genocide, 1941-1945. Svet Knjige. ISBN 978-86-7396-536-9.
- Perica, Vjekoslav (2002). Balkan Idols: Religion and Nationalism in Yugoslav States. Oxford University Press. ISBN 9780195174298.
- Petersen, A. (2017). "Shrine of Husayn's Head". Bones of Contention: Muslim Shrines in Palestine. Heritage Studies in the Muslim World. Springer Singapore. ISBN 978-981-10-6965-9.
- Talmon-Heller, Daniella; Kedar, B. Z.; Reiter, Y. (January 2016). "Vicissitudes of a Holy Place: Construction, Destruction and Commemoration of Mashhad Ḥusayn in Ascalon". Der Islam. 93 (1). Walter de Gruyter. doi:10.1515/islam-2016-0008. ISSN 1613-0928.
- Thapar, Romila (2004). Somanatha: The Many Voices of a History. Penguin Books India. ISBN 1-84467-020-1.
- Yagnik, Achyut; Sheth, Suchitra (2005), The Shaping of Modern Gujarat: Plurality, Hindutva, and Beyond, Penguin Books India, p. 39, ISBN 978-0-14-400038-8
