= List of landmarks destroyed or damaged by climate change =

Impacted natural and man-made landmarks

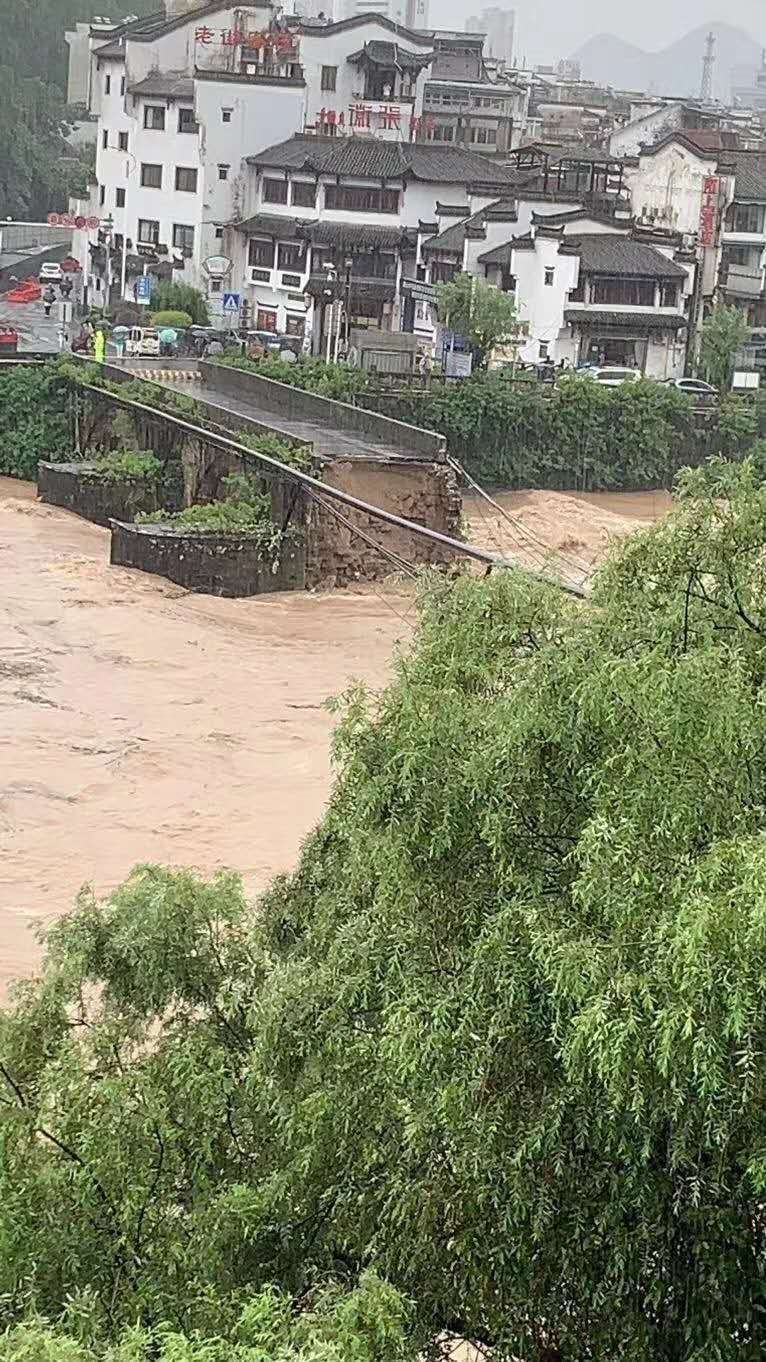
Ming dynasty-era Zhenhai Bridge destroyed by torrential floodwaters during the 2020 China floods, which were significantly exacerbated by anthropogenic climate change.

This is a list of significant natural or man-made landmarks that have been destroyed or damaged as a direct result or byproduct of anthropogenic climate change, such as by increased sea levels, exceptional rainfall or 100-year flooding, wildfires, and other exceptional natural disasters specifically linked to anthropogenic climate change.

== List ==
=== Destroyed ===
List of natural and man-made landmarks destroyed by anthropogenic climate change
Landmark	Location	Description	Destruction	Date Impacted	Reference
Double Arch	Glen Canyon National Recreation Area, Utah	190 million-year-old sandstone geological formation	Collapsed due to changing water levels and erosion	9 August 2024	
Big Chico Creek Ecological Reserve	Butte County, California	~7,800-acre (3,200 ha) property owned and used for educational purposes by Chico State University	Almost completely destroyed by the Park Fire worsened by an ongoing heatwave. Destruction included a historic barn and university offices.	Late July 2024	
St. Mary & St. George Anglican Church	Jasper, Alberta, Canada	Heritage Anglican church constructed in 1914	Destroyed in the Jasper wildfire	24 July 2024	
Kellogg House	Rich Bar in Plumas County, California	Ghost town building containing original furnishings from the 1800s	Destroyed in the Dixie Fire	23 or 24 July 2021	
White Sulphur Springs	Napa County, California	Oldest warm mineral springs resort facility in Northern California, founded in 1852	Destroyed in the Glass Fire	October 2020	
Zhenhai Bridge	Tunxi District of Huangshan City, China	Ming dynasty-era large stone arch bridge and "Major Historical and Cultural Site Protected at the National Level in Anhui"	Destroyed in the 2020 China floods	7 July 2020	
Lecheng Bridge	Sanxi Town of Jingde County, China	Qing dynasty stone arch bridge and Provincial Cultural Relics Protection landmark	Destroyed in the 2020 China floods by torrential mountain downpours	6 July 2020	
Honey Run Covered Bridge	Butte County, California	The last three-span Pratt-style truss bridge in the U.S., built in 1886 and on the National Register of Historic Places	Destroyed in the Camp Fire, worsened by extreme weather conditions	8 November 2018	

=== Damaged ===
List of natural and man-made landmarks damaged by anthropogenic climate change
Landmark	Location	Description	Destruction	Date Impacted	Reference
Pyramidal structure in Ihuatzio	Ihuatzio, Mexico	Pyramid in the Ihuatzio Archaeological Zone, First seat of the Purépecha empire from 1200 to 1521 CE.	Heavy rainfall causing the collapse of the structure's central southern end	29 July 2024	
Great Mosque of Samarra	Samarra, Iraq	9th-century mosque	Minaret weathered by more frequent and intense sandstorms		
Temple of Ishtar	Babylon, Iraq	Temple in the ancient Mesopotamian city of Babylon, capital of the Babylonian Empire	Salt accumulation from dried saltwater rivers causing cracking of the structure's bricks		
Tabo monastery	Spiti valley, India	Tibetan Buddhist monastery established in 996 CE and expanded in the 11th century CE.	Damage to ancient murals and mud walls due to increased incidence of rainfall due to climate change in the Spiti valley cold desert.	Since the early 2000s	

== See also ==
- Cultural heritage sites at risk from climate change
- List of areas depopulated due to climate change
- List of destroyed heritage
- List of World Heritage in Danger
