= List of Major National Historical and Cultural Sites in Anhui =

This list is of Major Sites Protected for their Historical and Cultural Value at the National Level in the Province of Anhui, People's Republic of China.

Site	Chinese name	Location	Designation	Image
Headquarters of the New Fourth Army	Xinsijun junbu jiuzhi 新四军军部旧址	Jing County	1-27	Upload file
Ming Central Capital and Rock Carvings of the Imperial Mausoleum	Ming zhongdu huang gucheng ji Huangling shike 明中都皇故城及皇陵石刻	Fengyang County	2-55	Upload file
Anfengtang (Quebei)	Anfeng tang 安丰塘 (Quebei 芍陂)	Shou County	3-53	Upload file
Hu Clan Ancestral Temple in Longchuan	Longchuan Hushi zongci 龙川胡氏宗祠	Jixi County	3-84	Upload file
Dwellings in Qiankou	Qiankou minzhai 潜口民宅	Huangshan	3-88	Upload file
Xuguo Stone Arch	Xu Guo shifang 许国石坊	She County	3-102	Upload file
Huaxilou	Huaxilou 花戏楼	Bozhou	3-131	Upload file
Twin Pagodas of Guangjiao Temple	Guangjiao si shuang ta 广教寺双塔	Xuancheng	3-145	Upload file
Site of Hexian Man	Hexian yuanren yizhi 和县猿人遗址	He County	3-184	Upload file
Xuejiagang Site	Xuejiagang yizhi 薛家岗遗址	Qianshan County	4-9	Upload file
Copper Mines of Dagongshan and Fenghuangshan	Dagongshan - Fenghuangshan tongkuang yizhi 大工山—凤凰山铜矿遗址	Nanling County	4-27	Upload file
Stone Arches in Tangyue	Tangyue shipai fangqun 棠樾石牌坊群	She County	4-141	Upload file
Laowu Ge and Lürao Pavilion	Laowu ge ji Lürao ting 老屋阁及绿绕亭	Huangshan	4-142	Upload file
Luo Dongshu Tremple	Luo Dongshu ci 罗东舒祠	Huangshan	4-143	Upload file
Command Post of the Crossing-the-Yangtze Campaign	Dujiang zhanyi zong qianwei jiuzhi 渡江战役总前委旧址	Feidong County	4-248	Upload file
Chenshan Site	Chenshan yizhi 陈山遗址	Xuancheng	5-44	Upload file
Lingjiatan Site	Lingjiatan yizhi 凌家滩遗址	Hanshan County	5-45	Upload file
Yuchisi Site	Yuchisi yizhi 尉迟寺遗址	Mengcheng County	5-46	Upload file
Chu Shouchun ruins	Shouchun cheng yizhi 寿春城遗址	Shou County	5-47	Upload file
Shouzhou Kiln Site	Shouzhou yao yizhi 寿州窑遗址	Huainan	5-48	Upload file
Liuzi dock on the Grand Canal	Liuzi yunhe matou yizhi 柳孜运河码头遗址	Suixi County	5-49	Upload file
Fanchang Kiln Site	Fanchang yao yizhi 繁昌窑遗址	Fanchang County	5-50	Upload file
Burial Mounds of South Anhui	Wannan tudun muqun 皖南土墩墓群	Nanling County	5-164	Upload file
Cao Family Tombs	Caoshi jiazu qumun 曹氏家族墓群	Bozhou	5-165	Upload file
Zhu Ran Family cemetery	Zhu Ran jiazu mudi 朱然家族墓地	Ma'anshan	5-166	Upload file
Twin Pagodas of Shuixi	Shuixi shuang ta 水西双塔	Jing County	5-314	Upload file
Ancient Tunnels in Bozhou	Bozhou gu didao 亳州古地道	Bozhou	5-315	Upload file
Baiyazhai	Baiyazhai 白崖寨	Susong County	5-316	Upload file
Three Houses of the Cheng Family	Chengshi sanzhai 程氏三宅	Huangshan	5-317	Upload file
Old Architecture of Chengkan	Chengkancun gu jianzhuqun 呈坎村古建筑群	Huangshan	5-318	Upload file
Yuliang Dam	Yuliang ba 渔梁坝	She County	5-319	Upload file
Old Architecture of Hongcun	Hongcun gu jianzhuqun 宏村古建筑群	Yi County	5-320	Upload file
Old Architecture of Xidi	Xidi cun gu jianzhuqun 西递村古建筑群	29°54′16″N 117°59′15″E Yi County	5-321	Upload file
City Wall of Shouxian	Shouxian gu chengqiang 寿县古城墙	Shou County	5-322	Upload file
Old Architecture of Zhaji	Chaji gu jianzhuqun 查济古建筑群	Jing County	5-323	Upload file
Rock Carvings of Mount Tianzhu	Tianzhushan shangu liuquan moya shike 天柱山山谷流泉摩崖石刻	Qianshan County	5-452	Upload file
Renzi Cave	Renzi dong yizhi 人字洞遗址	Fanchang County	6-93	Upload file
Linhuan City ruins	Linhuan chengzhi 临涣城址	Suixi County	6-94	Upload file
Tomb of Li Bai	Li Bai mu 李白墓	Dangtu County	6-252	Upload file
Wanfo Pagoda	Mengcheng Wanfota 蒙城万佛塔	Mengcheng County	6-567	Upload file
Old Architecture of Xucun	Xucun gu jianzhuqun 许村古建筑群	She County	6-568	Upload file
Old Stage of Qimen	Qimen gu xitai 祁门古戏台	Qimen County	6-569	Upload file
Old Architecture of Nanping Village	Nanpingcun gu jianzhuqun 南屏村古建筑群	Yi County	6-570	Upload file
Old Architecture of Jiangcun	Jiangcun gu jianzhuqun 江村古建筑群	Jingde County	6-571	Upload file
Zhenfeng Pagoda	Zhenfeng ta 振风塔	30°30′13″N 117°02′57″E Anqing	6-572	Upload file
Sanhuaitang in Xitou	Xitou Sanhuaitang 溪头三槐堂	Xiuning County	6-573	Upload file
Zheng Clan Ancestral Temple	Zheng shi zingci 郑氏宗祠	She County	6-574	Upload file
Zhushan Academy	Zhushan shuyuan 竹山书院	She County	6-575	Upload file
Old Architecture of Huangtian Village	Huangtiancun gu jianzhuqun 黄田村古建筑群	Jing County	6-576	Upload file
Shitaishidi	Shitaishidi 世太史第	Anqing	6-577	Upload file
Rock Carvings of Mount Qiyun	Qiyunshan shike 齐云山石刻	Xiuning County	6-825	Upload file
Former Residence of Liu Mingchuan	Liu Mingchuan jiuju 刘铭传旧居	Feixi County	6-957	Upload file
Li Family Residence	Li shi zhuangyuan 李氏庄园	Huoqiu County	6-958	Upload file
Former Residence of Feng Yuxiang	Feng Yuxiang jiuju 冯玉祥旧居	Chaohu	6-959	Upload file
Site of the Battle of Banta	Banta baowei zhan jiuzhi 半塔保卫战旧址	Lai'an County	6-960	Upload file
Command Post of the Huaihai Campaign and the East China Field Army	Huaihai zhanyi zong qianwei he Huadong yezhanjun zhihuibu jiuzhi 淮海战役总前委和华东野战军指挥部旧址	Suixi County	6-961	Upload file

== See also ==
- Principles for the Conservation of Heritage Sites in China
