= Dengfeng Bridge =

Dengfeng Bridge 登封桥
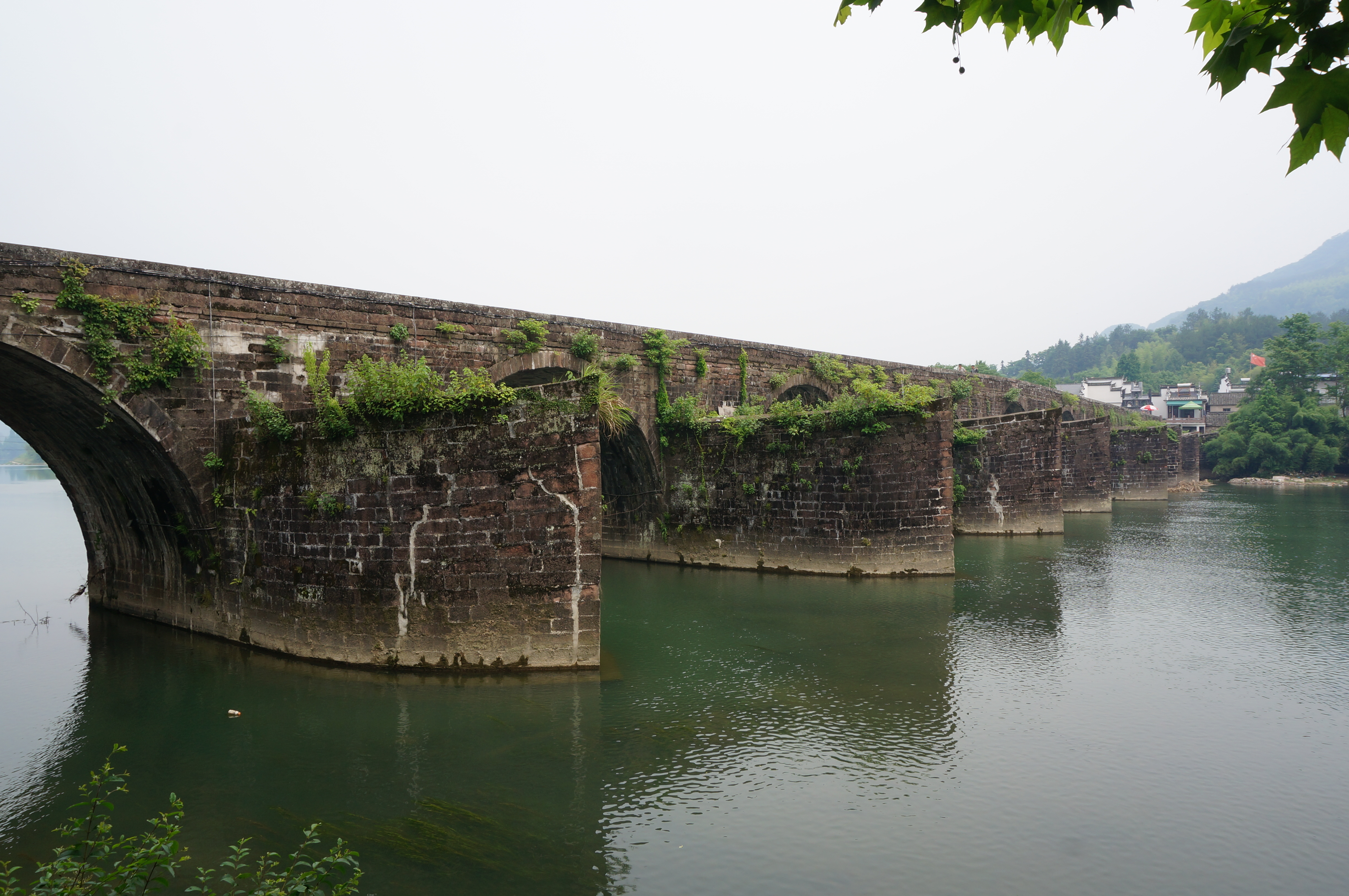
- Dengfeng Bridge in May 2015
- Coordinates: 29°49′20″N 118°03′26″E
- Carries: Pedestrians
- Crosses: Heng River
- Locale: Qiyunshan, Xiuning County, Anhui, China

Characteristics
- Design: Arch bridge
- Material: Stone
- Total length: 148 metres (486 ft)
- Width: 8 metres (26 ft)
- Height: 12 metres (39 ft)

History
- Construction end: 1587
- Rebuilt: 1791

Location
- Interactive map of Dengfeng Bridge

The Dengfeng Bridge (simplified Chinese: 登封桥; traditional Chinese: 登封橋; pinyin: Dēngfēng Qiáo) is a historic stone arch bridge over the Heng River in Qiyunshan, Xiuning County, Anhui, China.

== History ==
The bridge was first built in 1587 during the Ming dynasty (1368–1644) by Gu Zhixian, the than magistrate of Huizhou Prefecture, and was rebuilt in 1791 during the reign of Qianlong Emperor of the Qing dynasty (1644–1911).

On 16 October 2019, it was listed among the eighth batch of "Major National Historical and Cultural Sites in Anhui" by the State Council of China.
