= Wan'an, Anhui =

Wan'an 万安镇
- Town
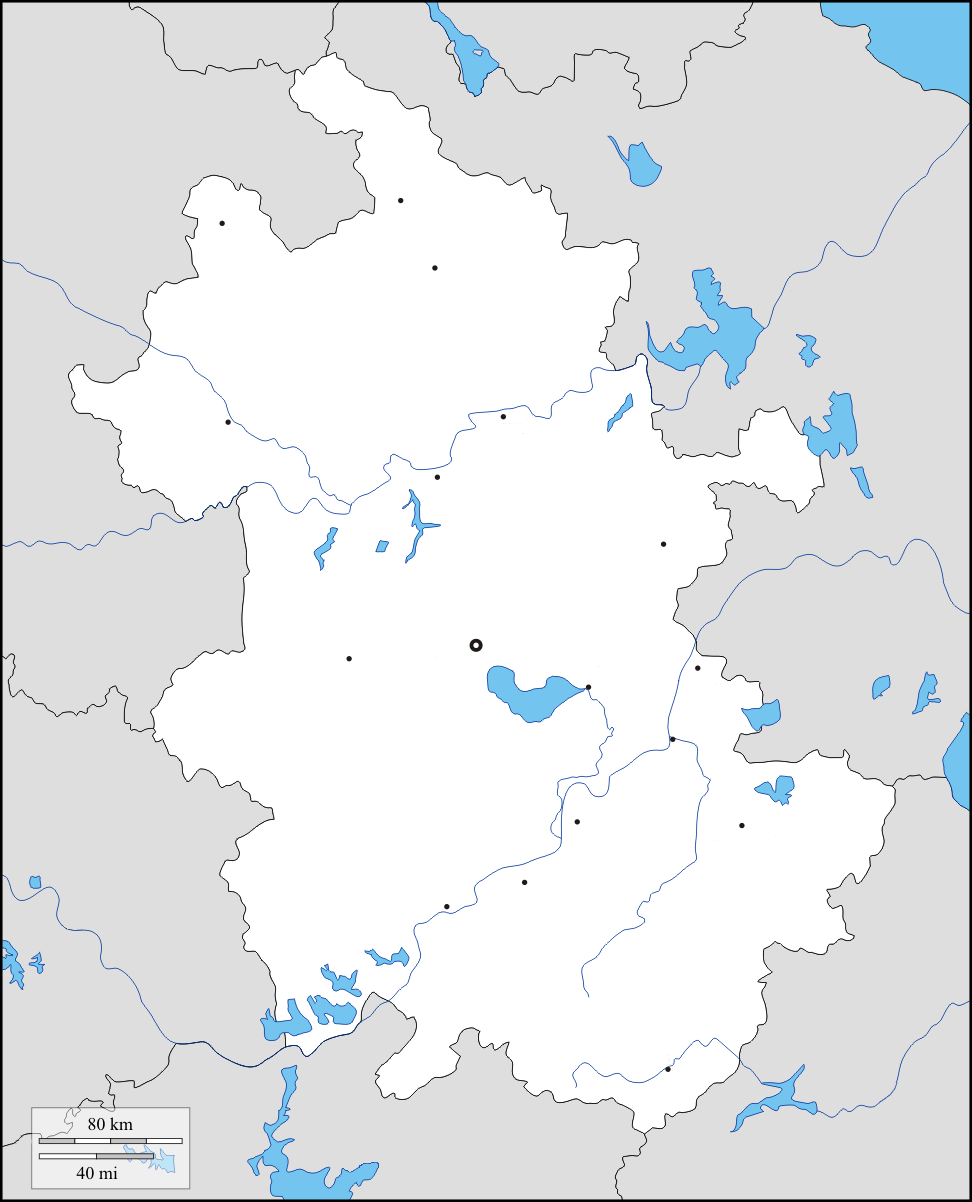
- Location in Anhui Wan'an (China)
- Coordinates: 29°47′30″N 118°12′44″E
- Country: People's Republic of China
- Province: Anhui
- Prefecture-level city: Huangshan
- County: Xiuning County
- Time zone: UTC+8 (China Standard)

Wan'an (simplified Chinese: 万安; traditional Chinese: 萬安; pinyin: Wàn'ān) is a town under the administration of Xiuning County, Anhui, China. As of 2018, it has 11 villages under its administration.
