= St. Mary & St. George Anglican Church =

St. Mary & St. George Parish
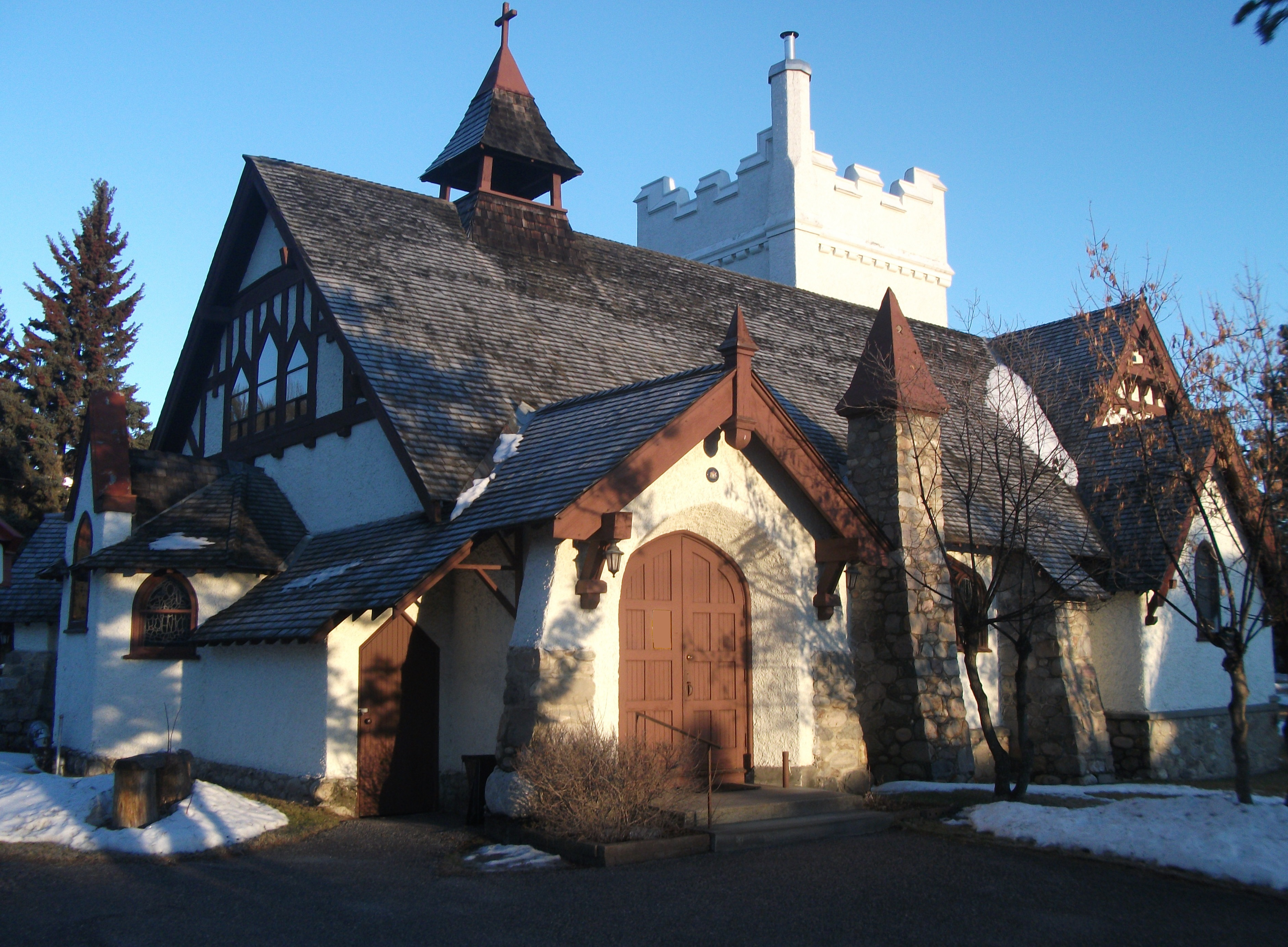
- 52.8750°N 118.0839°W
- Location: Jasper, Alberta
- Country: Canada
- Denomination: Anglican Church of Canada

Administration
- Province: Northern Lights
- Diocese: Edmonton

St. Mary & St. George Parish was a heritage church that reflected the English Gothic revival in Canada. It was in the town of Jasper, in the heart of Jasper National Park, on the Rocky Mountains in the Canadian province of Alberta. The parish church was within the ecclesiastical jurisdiction of the Anglican Diocese of Edmonton, Anglican Church of Canada.

The church was burned to the ground on July 24, 2024, as a wildfire swept through the town.

== History ==
Anglican ministry in the area began in 1909 with travelling missionaries. In 1914, after having been organized as a formal mission with permanent regular worship, a log church was constructed. It was consecrated by the first Bishop of Edmonton on August 2 of that same year. The Women’s Auxiliary of the Missionary Society of Church of England, along with two main donors, provided the bulk of the finances needed. A wooden tower was added in 1915 to provide living quarters for the rector. The church of St. Mary and St. George was designed by Mr. A.M. Calderon of Edmonton and built of local materials in 1928. To complete the church the Edith Cavell Memorial Tower was added in 1932. In 2020 one of its former rectors became bishop of the Anglican Diocese of the Southeast, in Mexico, bishop Julio César Martín-Trejo.

On July 24, 2024, a wildfire swept through Jasper destroying a large portion of the town. The church was one of the many structures that were completely destroyed by the fire.

== Double name church ==
The two main donors for the first church building had each requested a different name for the church. To please both, the church was named St. Mary and St. George. In 1923 the mission of St. Mary and St. George became a parish.

== Fourteenth-century Gothic church ==
The design and concept of the church was based on a blueprint for a 14th-century English Gothic church. The corner stone was laid by the Governor General of Canada, Freeman Freeman-Thomas, Viscount Willingdon, on July 29, 1928.

The church was consecrated on July 28, 1929. The modification of the original design for the tower caused a delay in its construction, and it was not completed until 1932. The tower is named in honour of British nurse Edith Cavell (1865-1915), executed by the German military during the First World War.

== Designation as a historical resource ==
In 1985, the Alberta Ministry of Culture declared St. Mary and St. George a historic resource on the grounds that it reflected the 14th century English Gothic Revival in Canada and was the only remaining ecclesiastic structure designed by A.M. Calderon, one of the early architects to work in Edmonton. The church was one of the most popular ecclesiastical venues for weddings in the Rocky Mountains and a main point of interest for tourists who each year visited Jasper from all over the world.

== Queen's visit ==
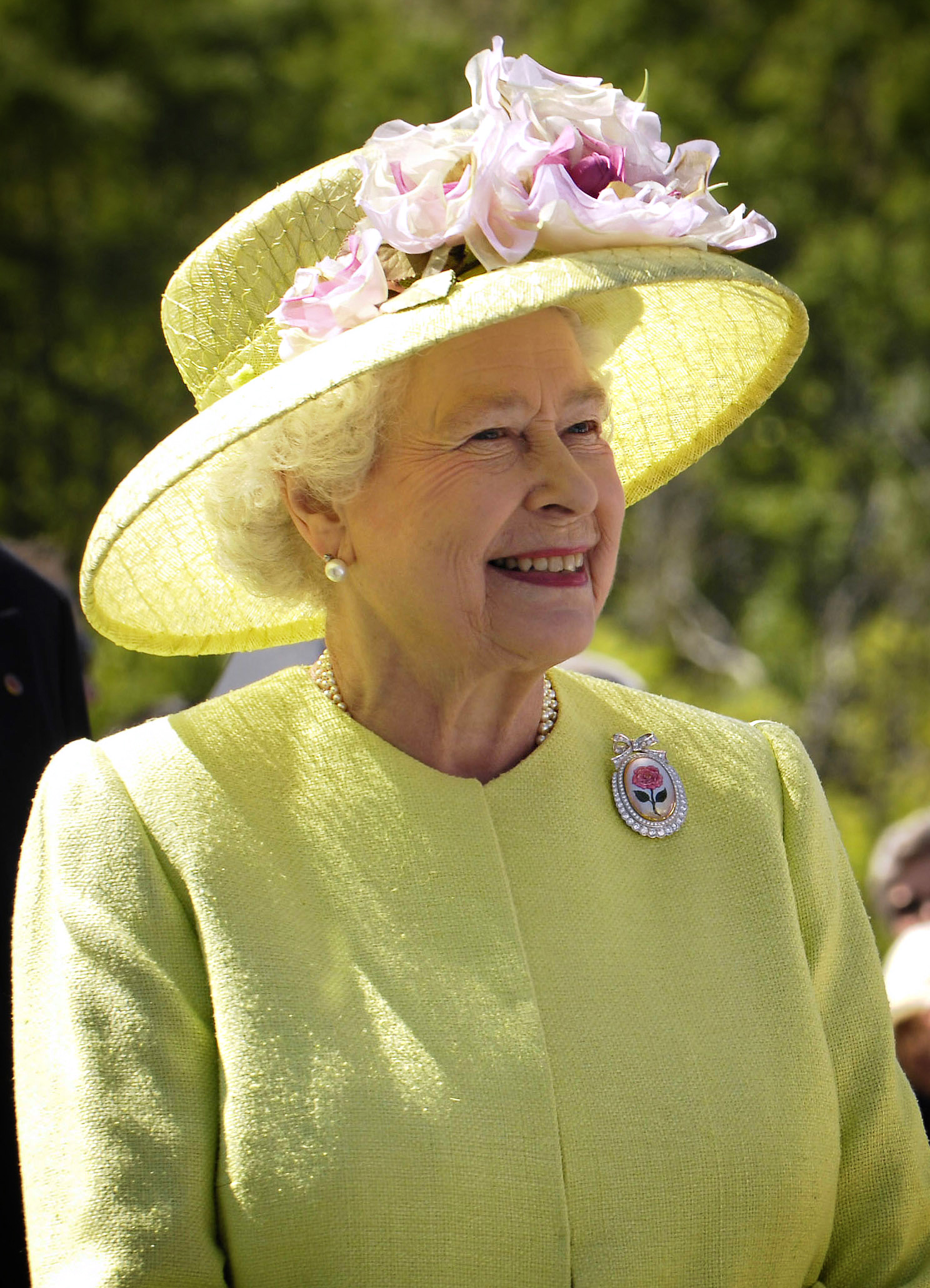
Queen Elizabeth II

In 2005, Queen Elizabeth II and Prince Philip, Duke of Edinburgh, visited the church and attended Morning Prayer in a service led by the then-Bishop of Edmonton Victoria Matthews. Previously on Victory in Europe Day May 8, 1945, the Earl of Athlone (governor general) and Princess Alice, Countess of Athlone, were present at the Thanksgiving Service.

== Architecture ==
The church of St. Mary and St. George was designed following the patterns of the Gothic style prevalent in 14th century rural England. It was a good example of the Gothic Revival style that has been present in Canada since the second quarter of the 19th century.

At the time of the building's construction, the Anglican Church (Church of England) was undergoing a revival of Anglo-Catholic ritualism, suggesting that Gothic was the appropriate style for a parish church in order to cultivate spirituality; believing that there is a direct link between the spiritual and the physical, between the architectural setting of worship and the spiritual experience of worship.

In Canada, this trend became so prevalent that one could refer to it as Canadian Gothic Revival.

However, the attempt to associate the style not only with spirituality but also with Anglo-Catholic theology was not so generalized. In the case of St. Mary and St. George Parish, the style was adopted solely for its aesthetic romantic and spiritual qualities.

Built in 1928, the church was primarily Decorated Gothic with Perpendicular Gothic details, while its tower finished in 1932 followed the Norman Gothic style. The church was one of the few remaining examples of mid-eighteenth century ecclesiastical architecture in Western Canada. As a building significant in the human history of Jasper, as well as of the utmost importance for the architectural history of Canada, it was declared a provincial historic resource in 1985.

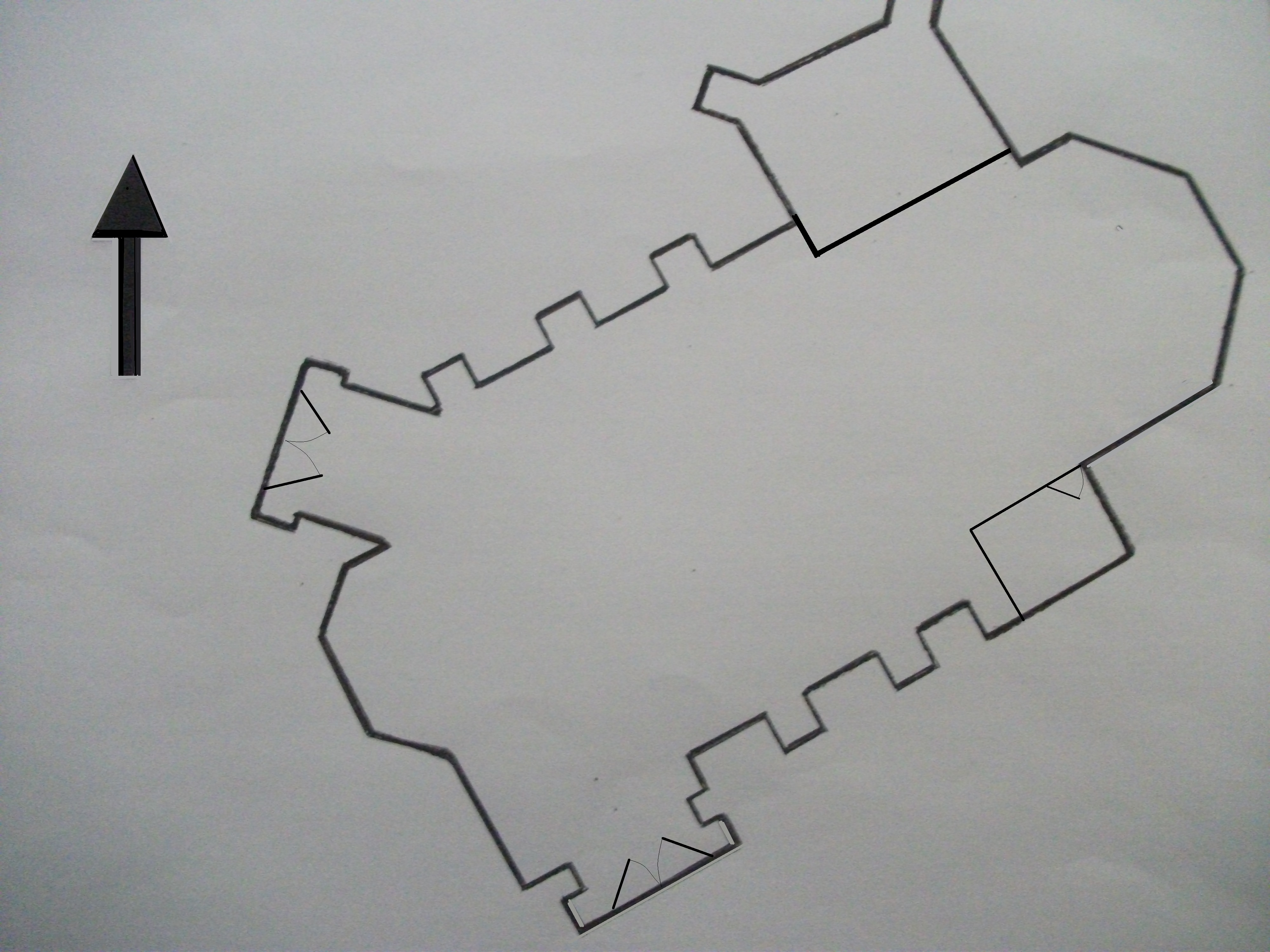
Groundfloor plan showing the church oriented towards the liturgical East (altar at the East apse)

== General description ==
The church was basilican in plan with a central nave leading to the chancel, which contained the sanctuary and the choir. The baptistery (or baptistry) was at the entrance end of the church. The church, in keeping with the ancient ecclesiastical tradition, was oriented towards the liturgical East, with its main apse at the East (the altar placed there), and the baptistery at the West apse.

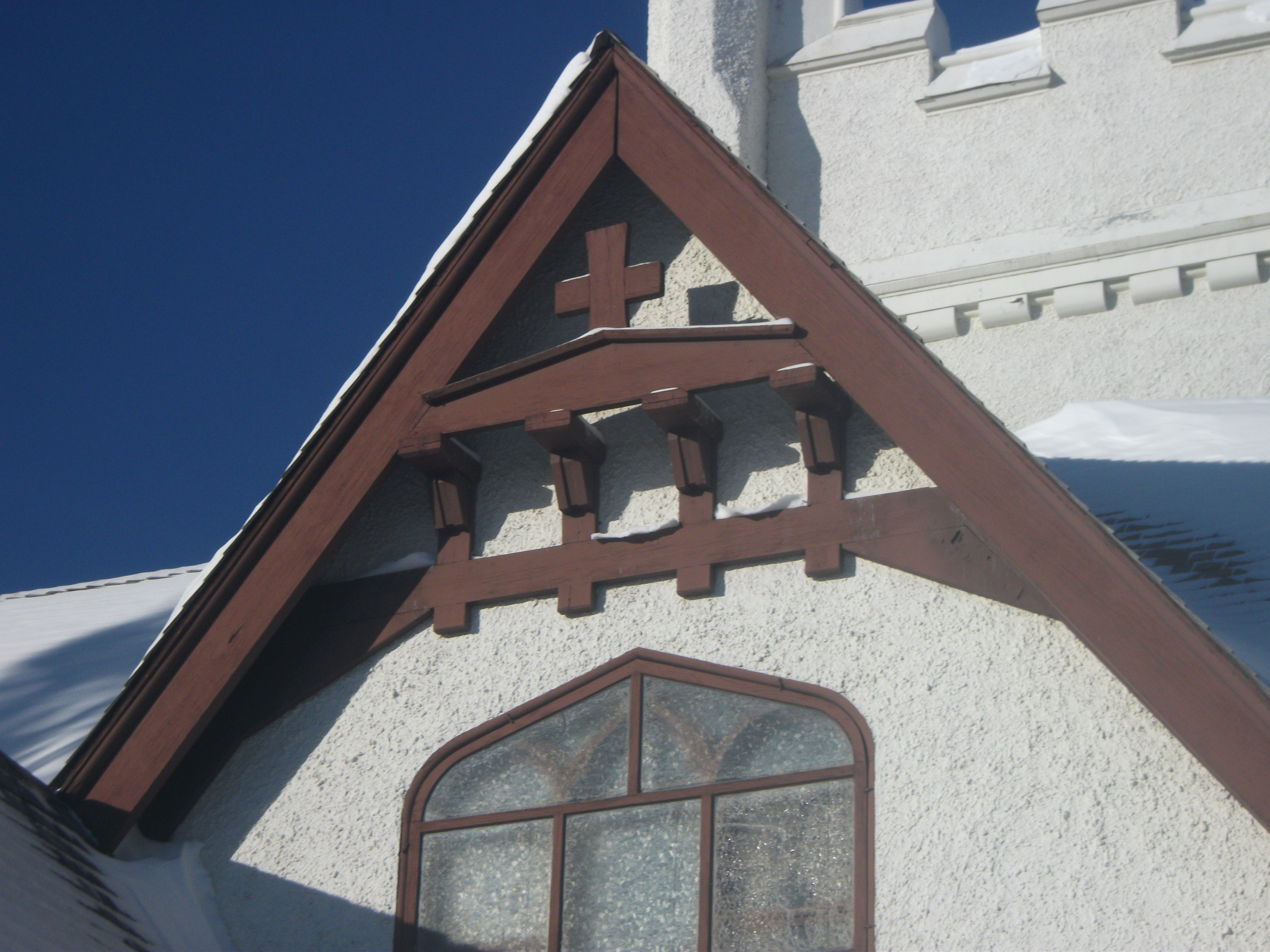
Beams, trim, and bargeboard over the southwest window

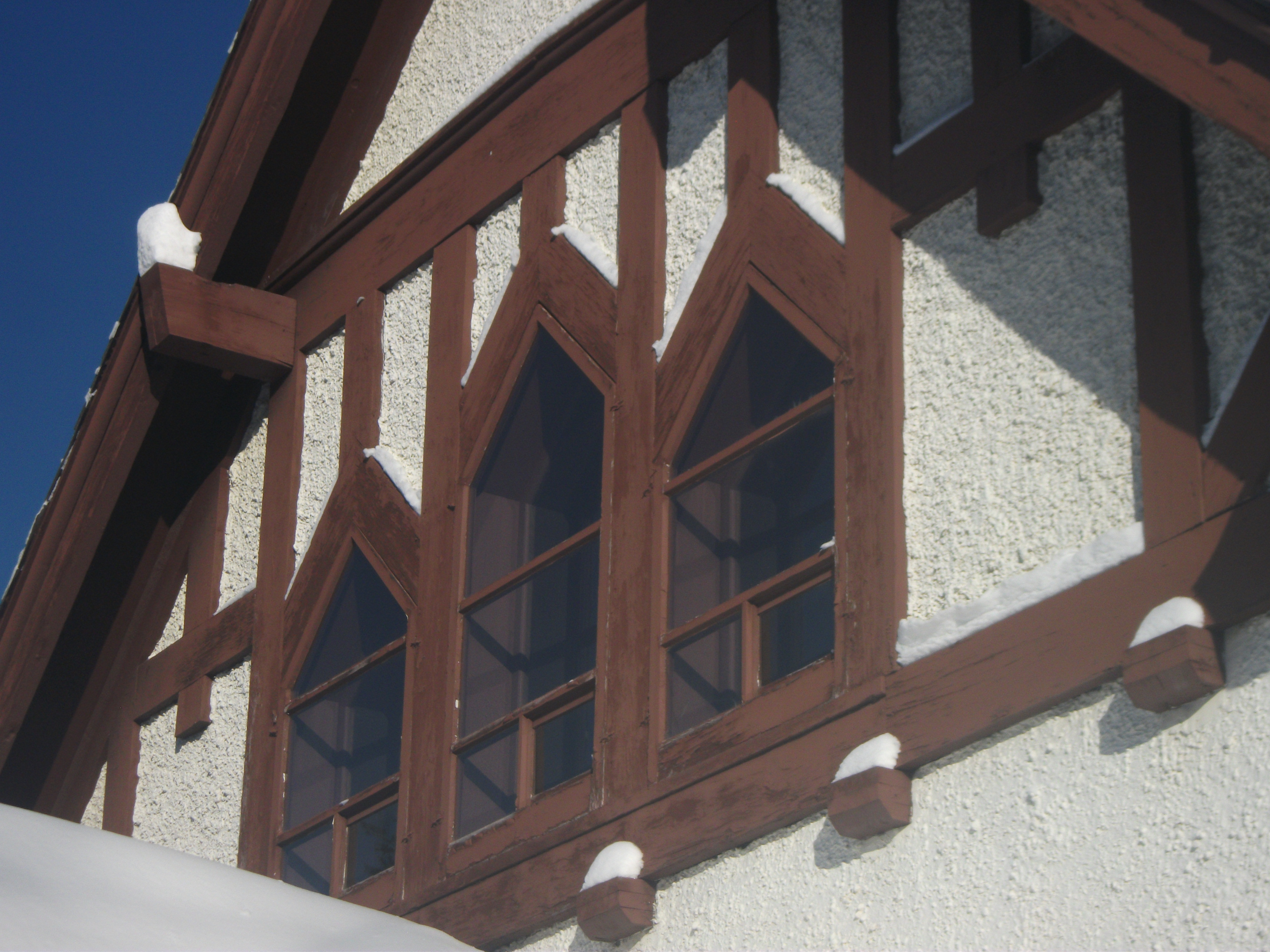
Southwest facade partitioned by exposed wooden trim

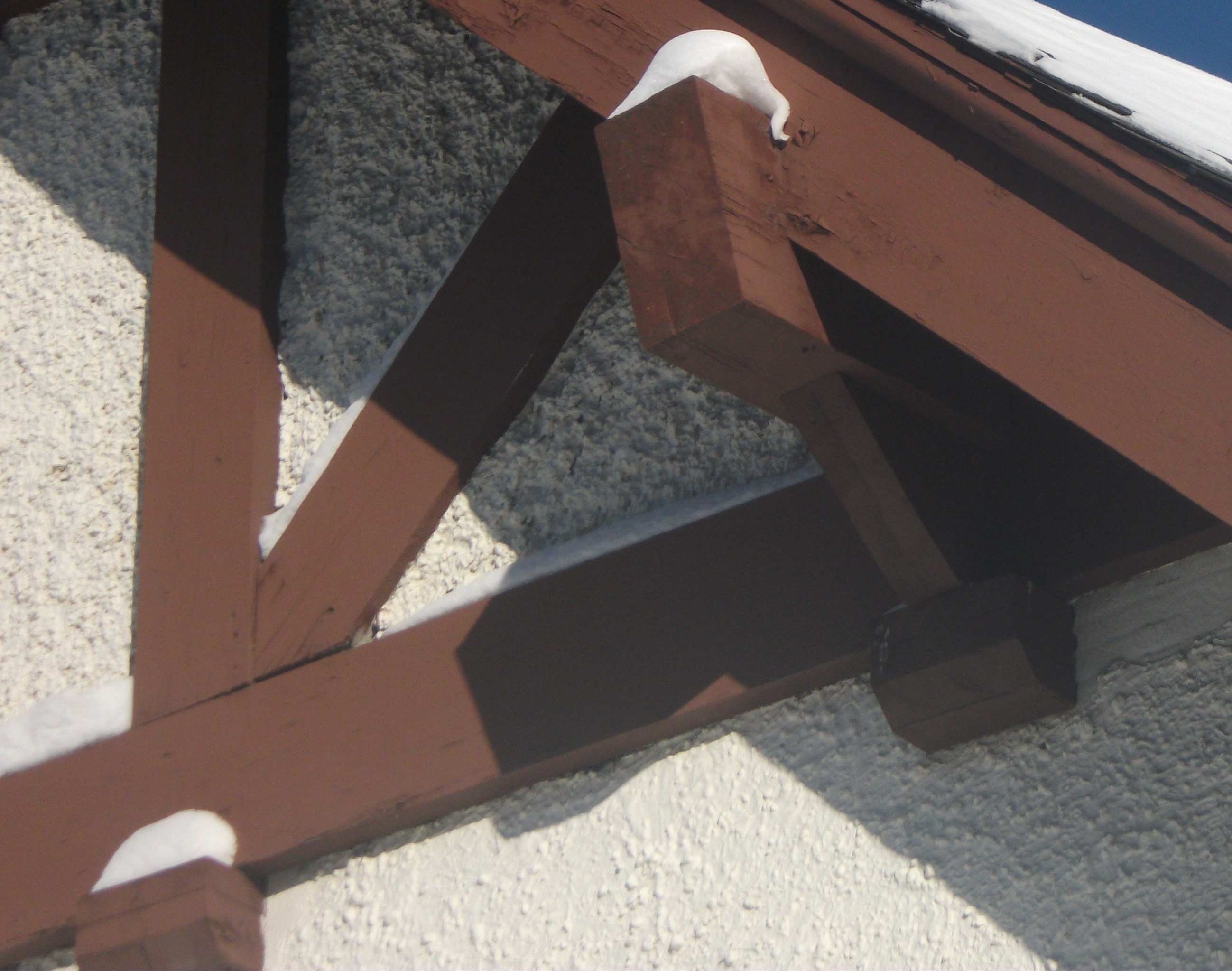
Exposed roof beam and wooden trim

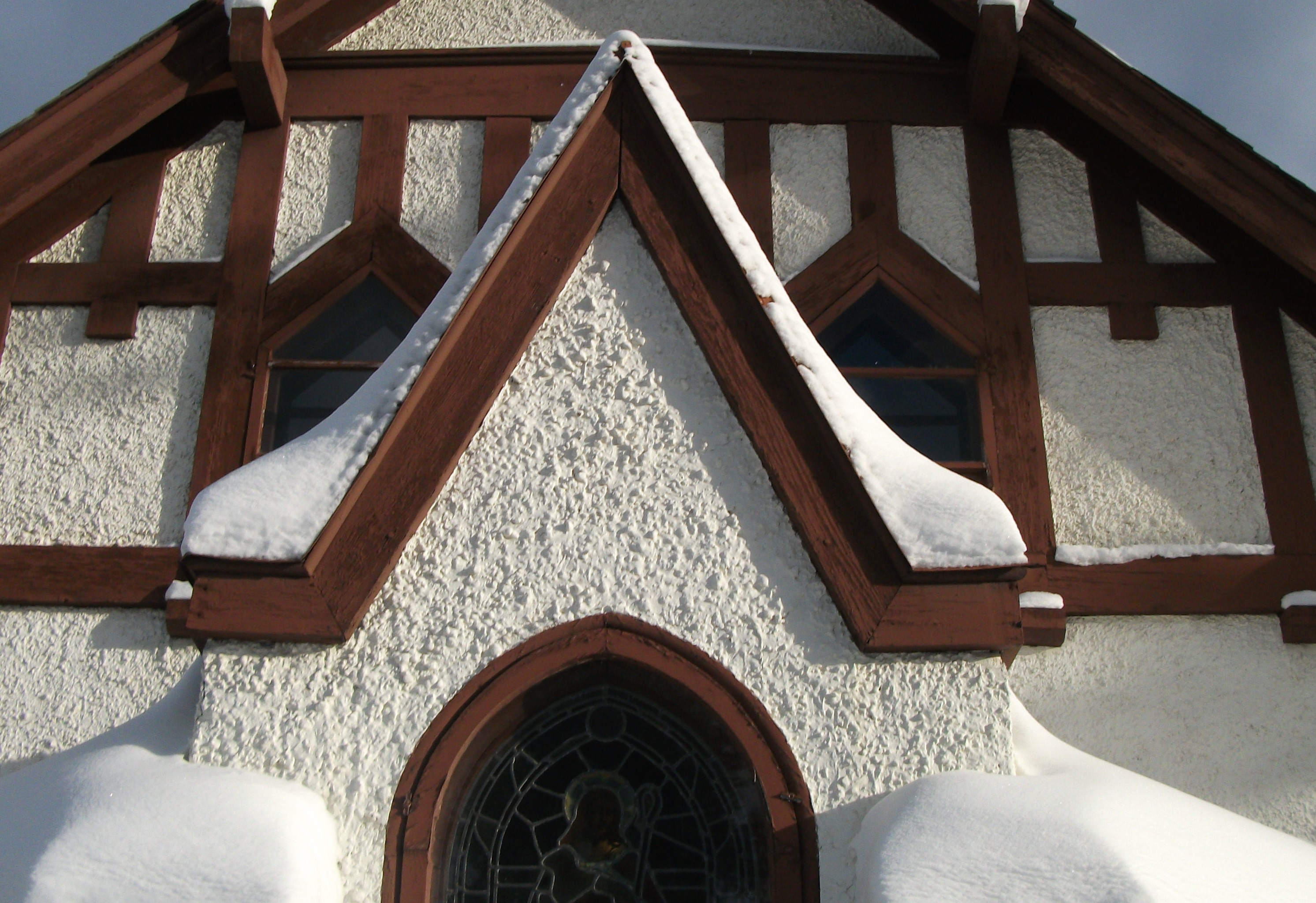
Gable on top of window East Facade

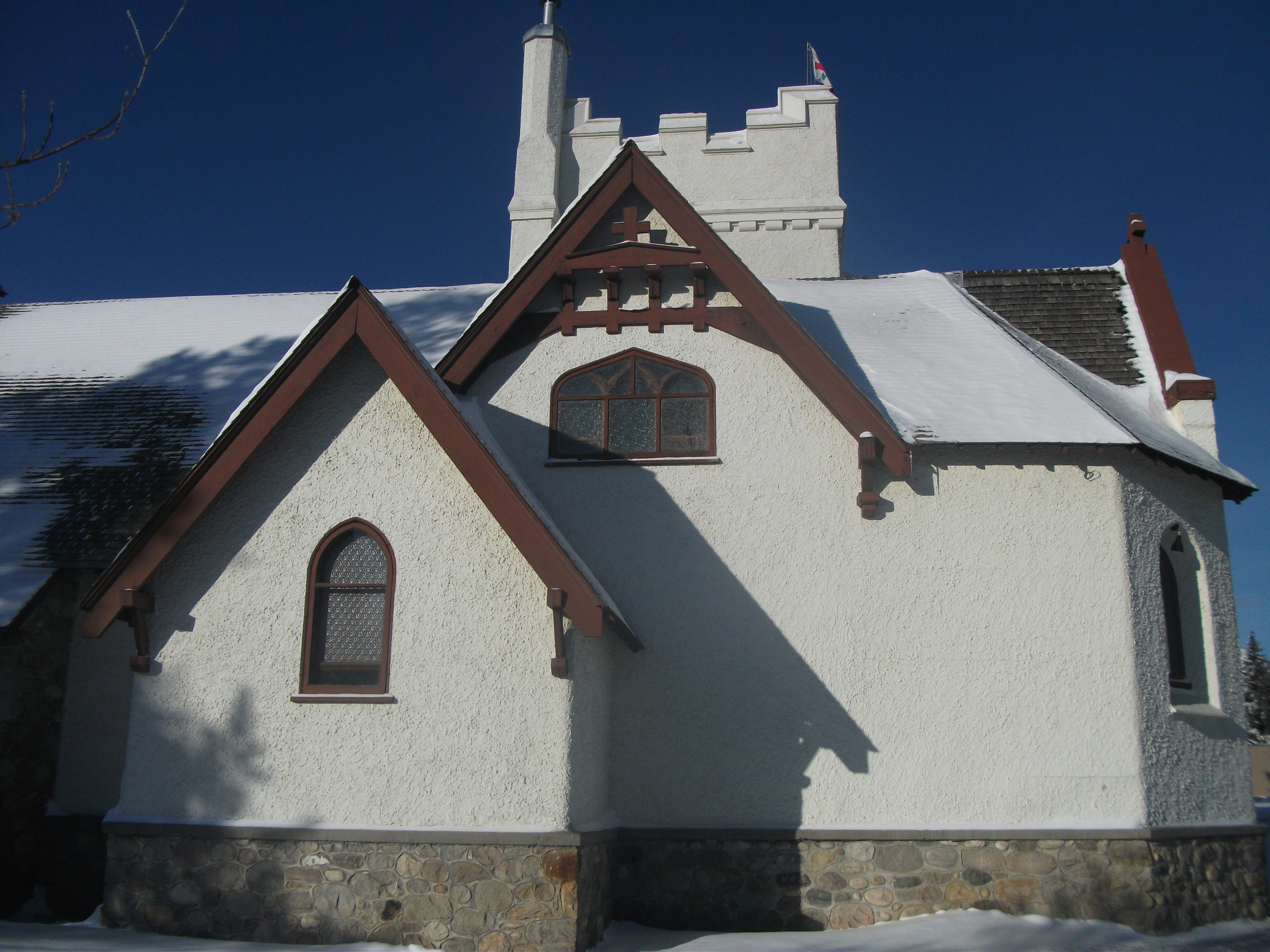
South east facade

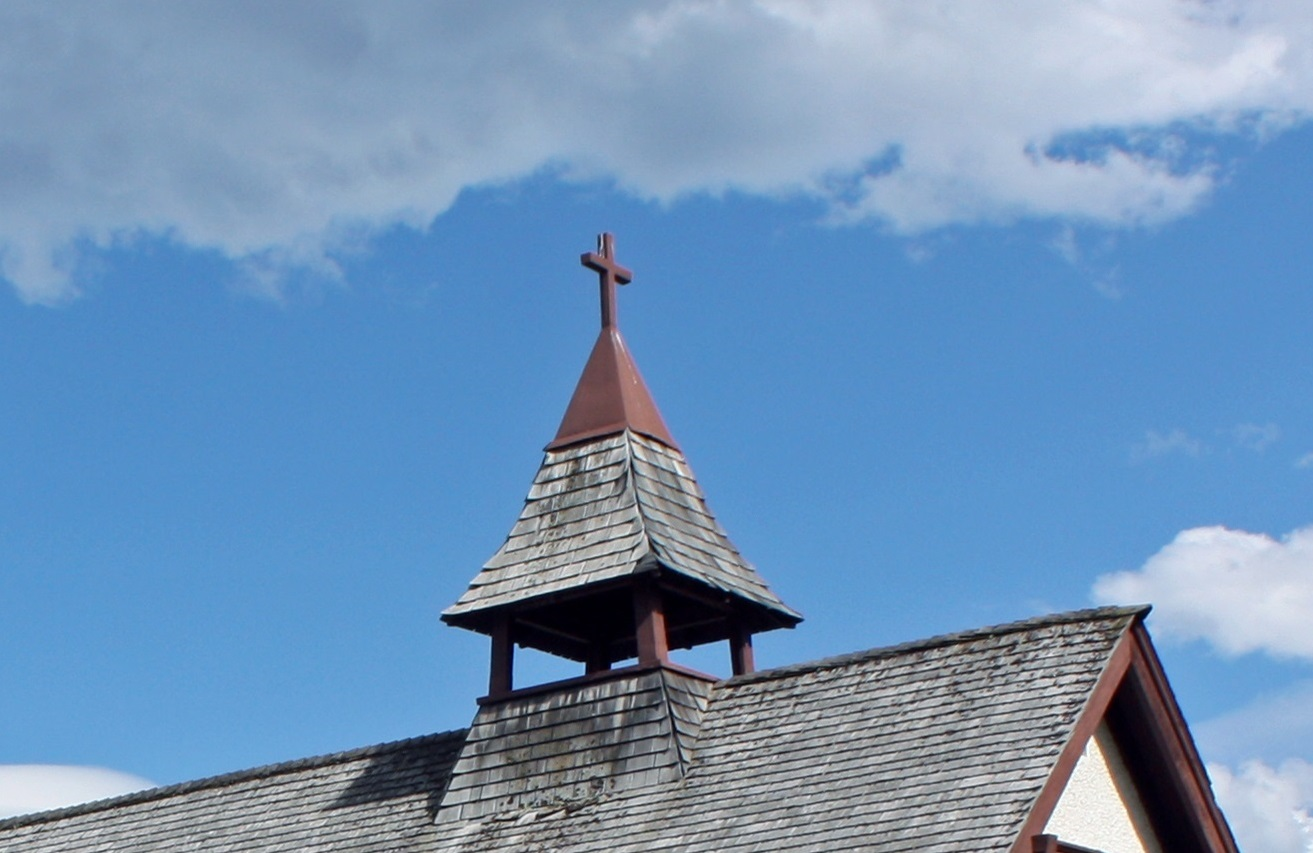
The symbolic Campanile

The church presented different types of the architecture typical of Gothic revival: the double pointed arch on the windows along the nave and sanctuary and baptistery (most of them with colourful stained glass and most of them dating from the first half of the 20th century) featuring figures and scenes from the New Testament Two of the stained glass windows (dating from 1992) were a fine blend of contemporary art and Christian imagery (the New Heaven window and the New Earth window. One exception to the New Testament thematic is "The Galahad window" based on Alfred, Lord Tennyson's version of the Arthurian legend and the quest for the Holy Grail (Le Morte d'Arthur) - in the Gothic style.

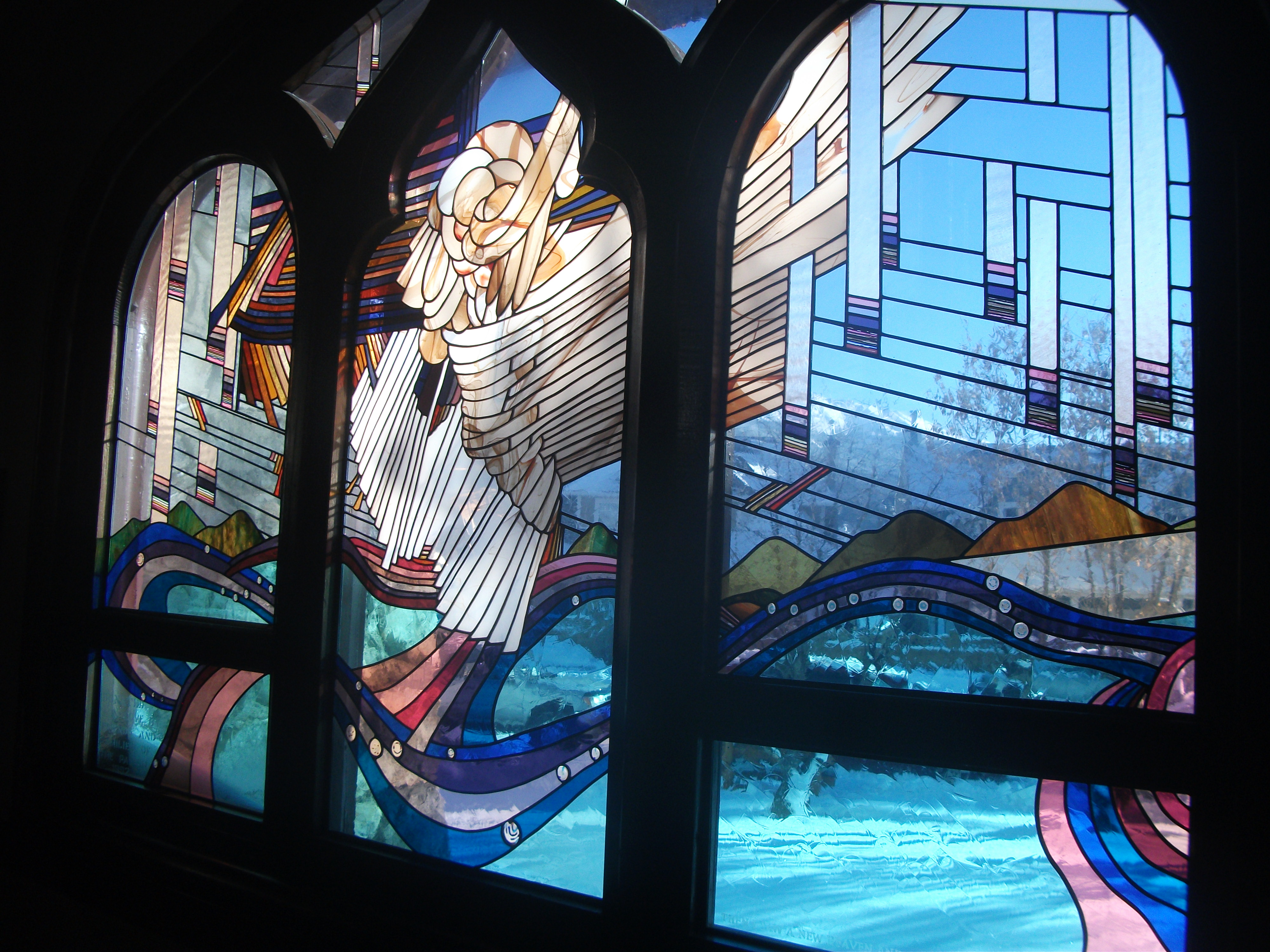
New heaven window

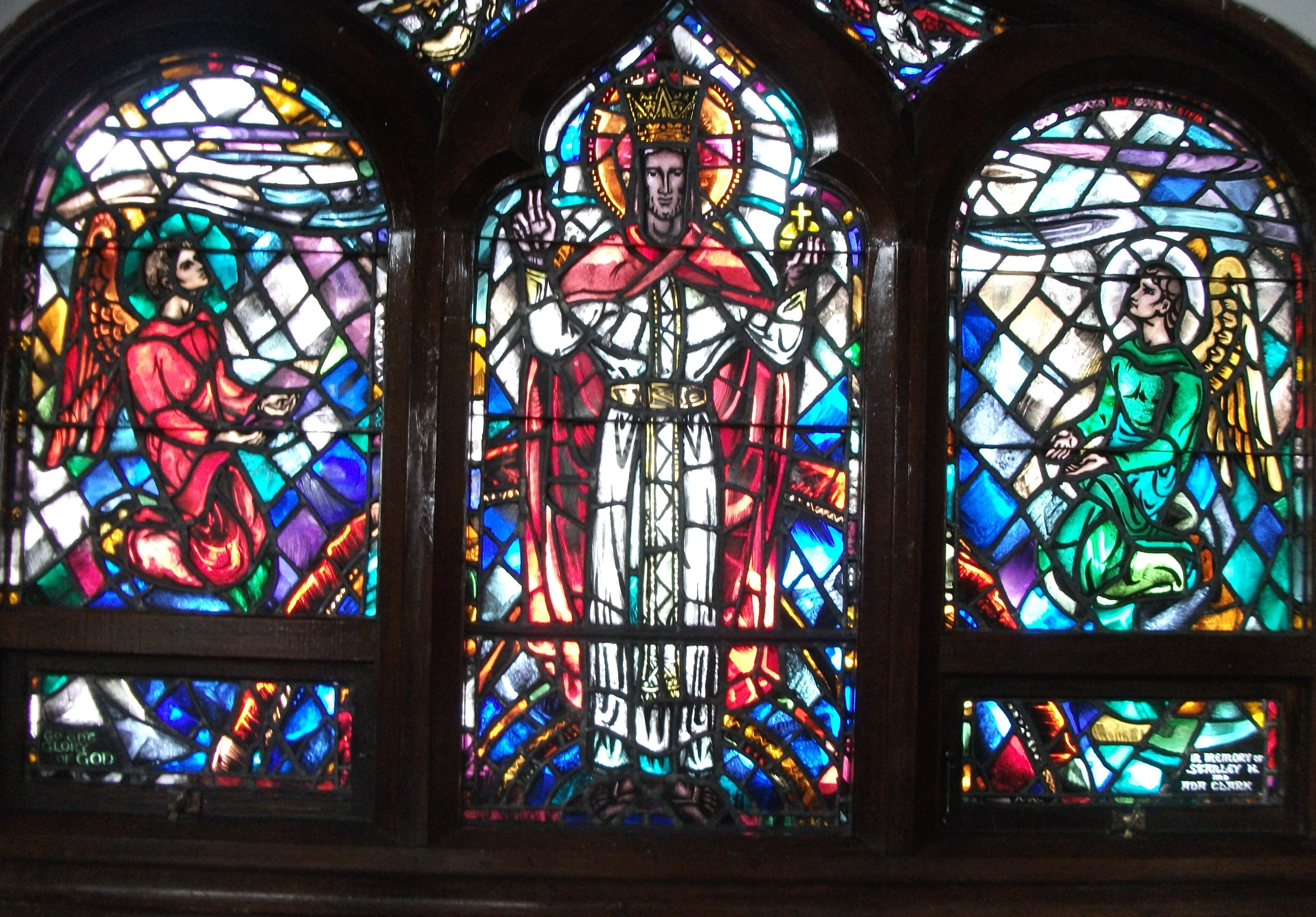
Our Lord window

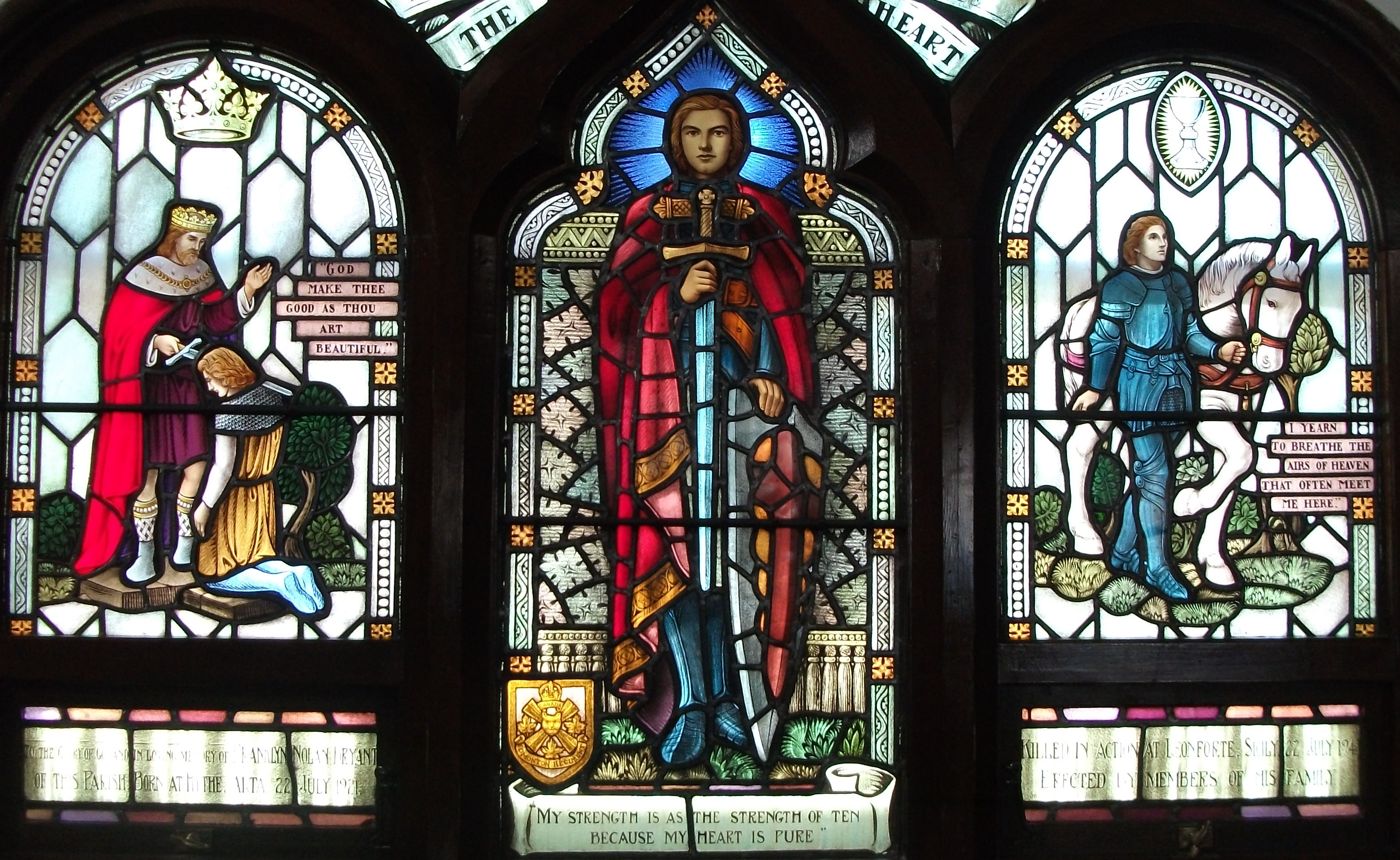
Galahad window: Left to right: Knighting; With Excalibur; Grail's Quest

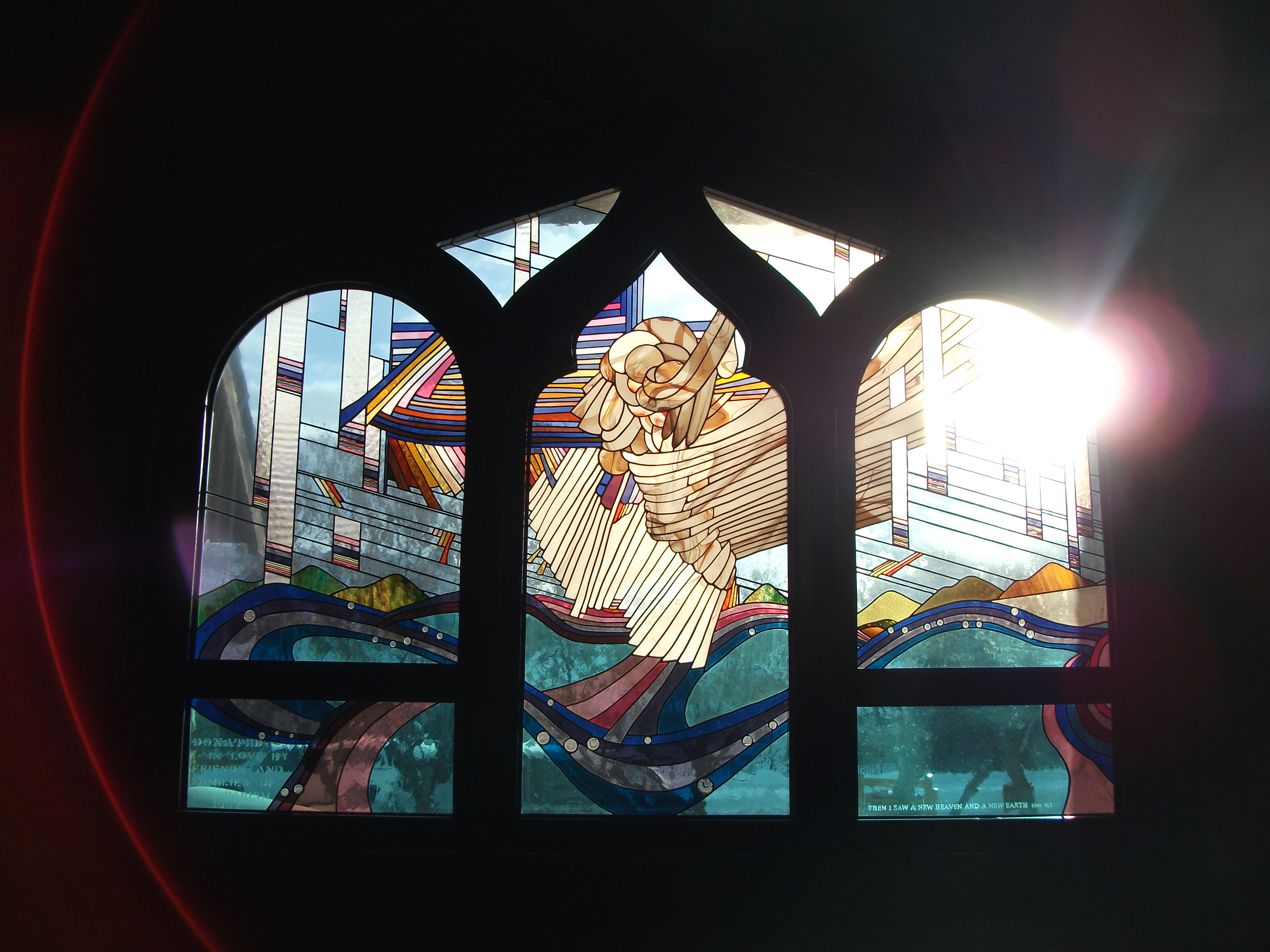
New heaven window

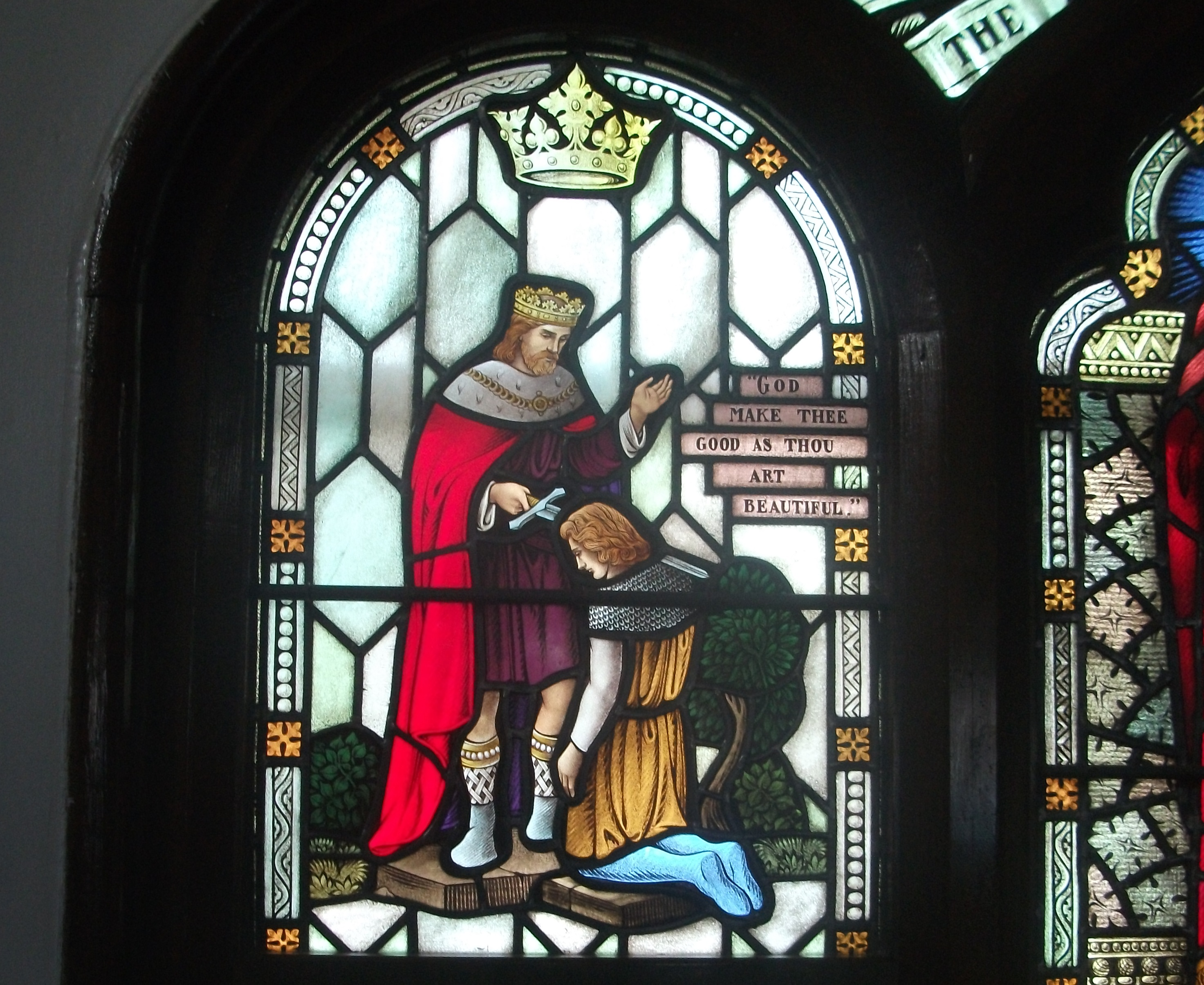
Knighting of Sir Galahad

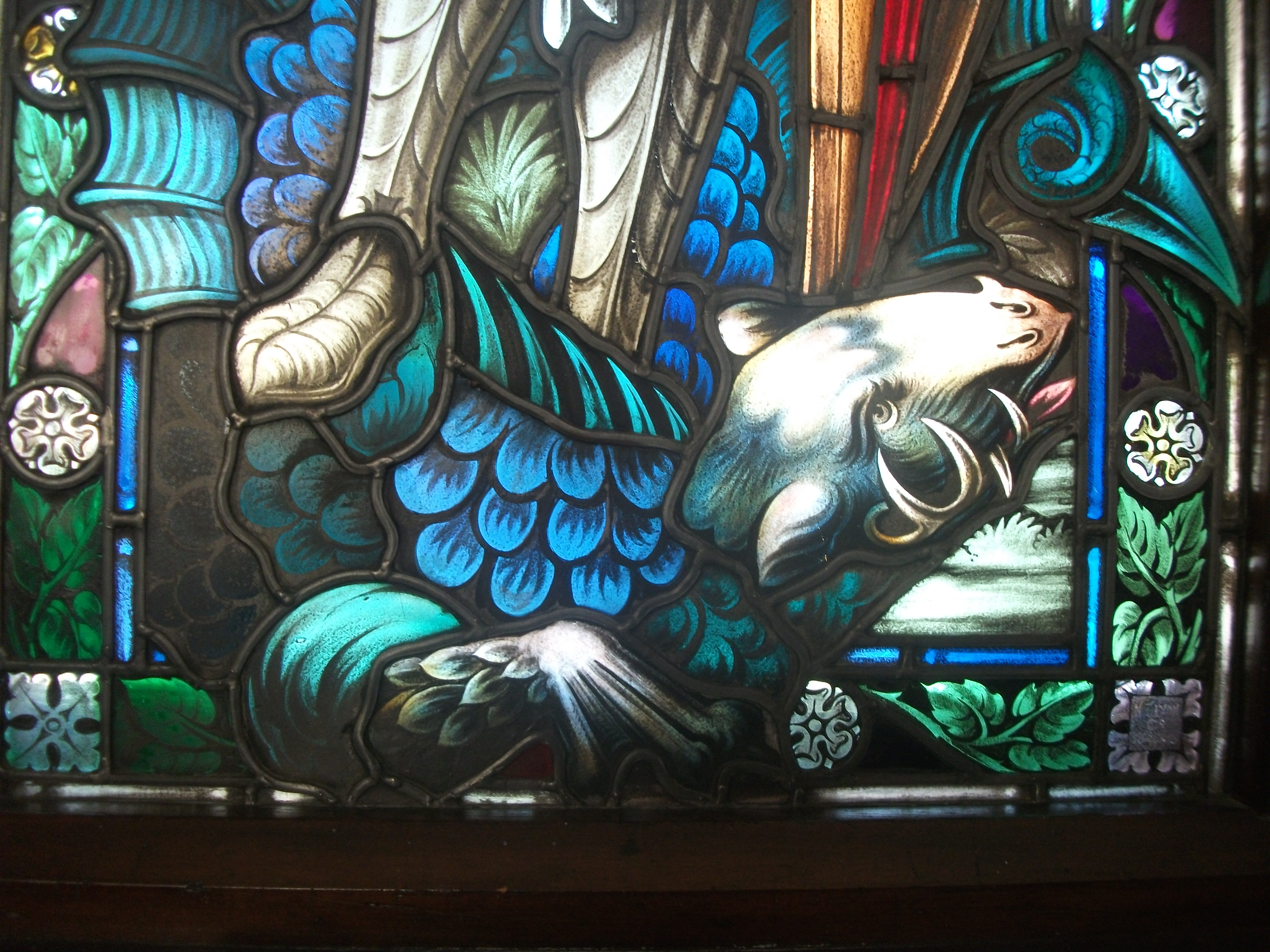
St. George Window (detail)

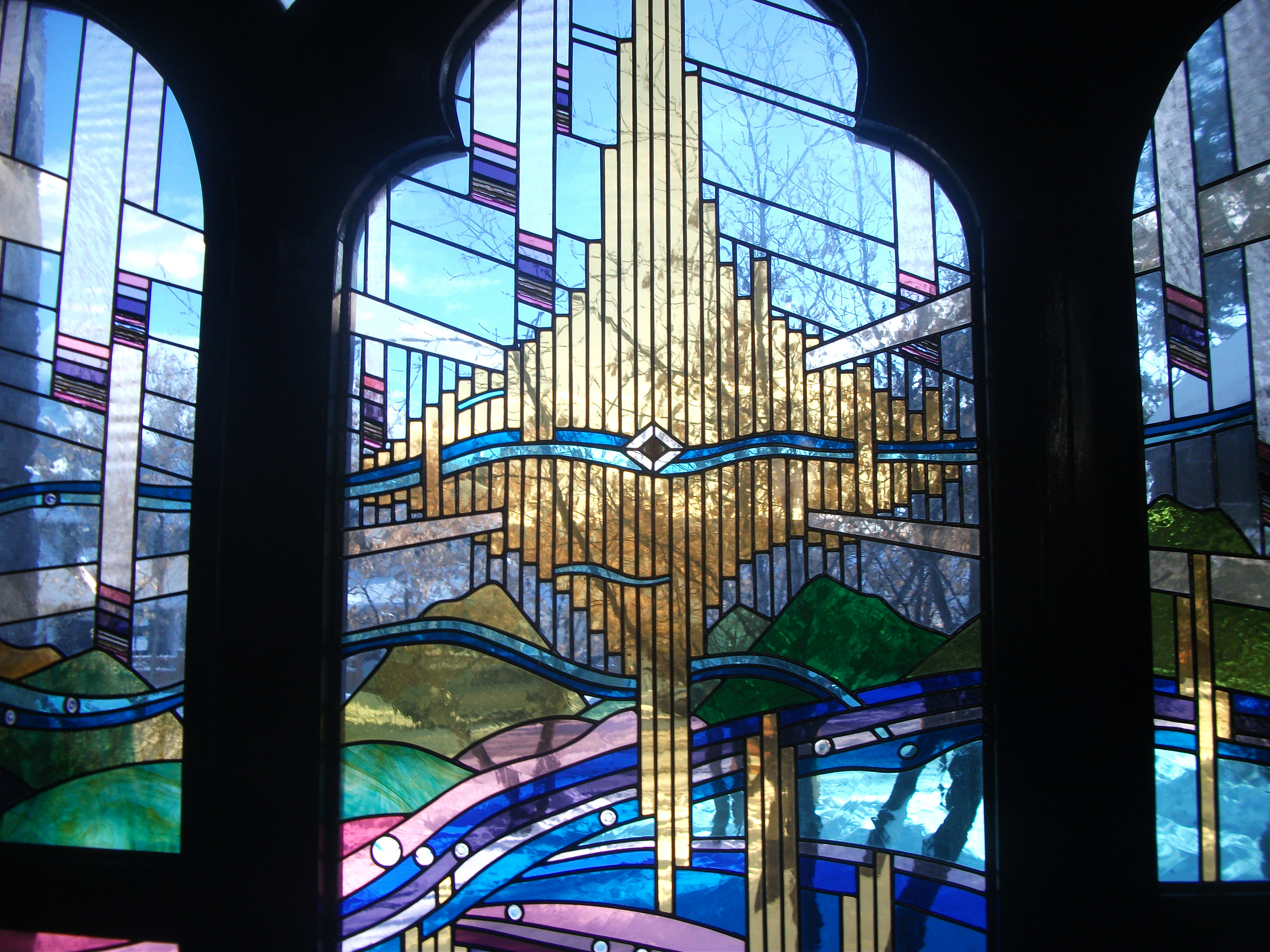
New Earth Window (detail)

There were a three-partitioned Tudor arch on the window at the southeast elevation in the chancel; a four-centred Tudor arch at the baptistery below three narrow pointed arch windows or clerestory windows; and two other four-centred Tudor arches for each entrance door.

The exterior walls were covered with white stucco. The facades on the southwest end over the baptistery were partitioned by exposed wooden trim (trim and mouldings typical of 14th century Rural Gothic). This theme was also retained over the southwest entrance and within the chancel gable. Exposed timber structure was generalized along with asymmetrical massing and contrasting roof-levels.

High peaked gables, exposed roof beams and barge boards at the edges of the roof could be seen in the outside; all elements of the rural Gothic Tudor style.

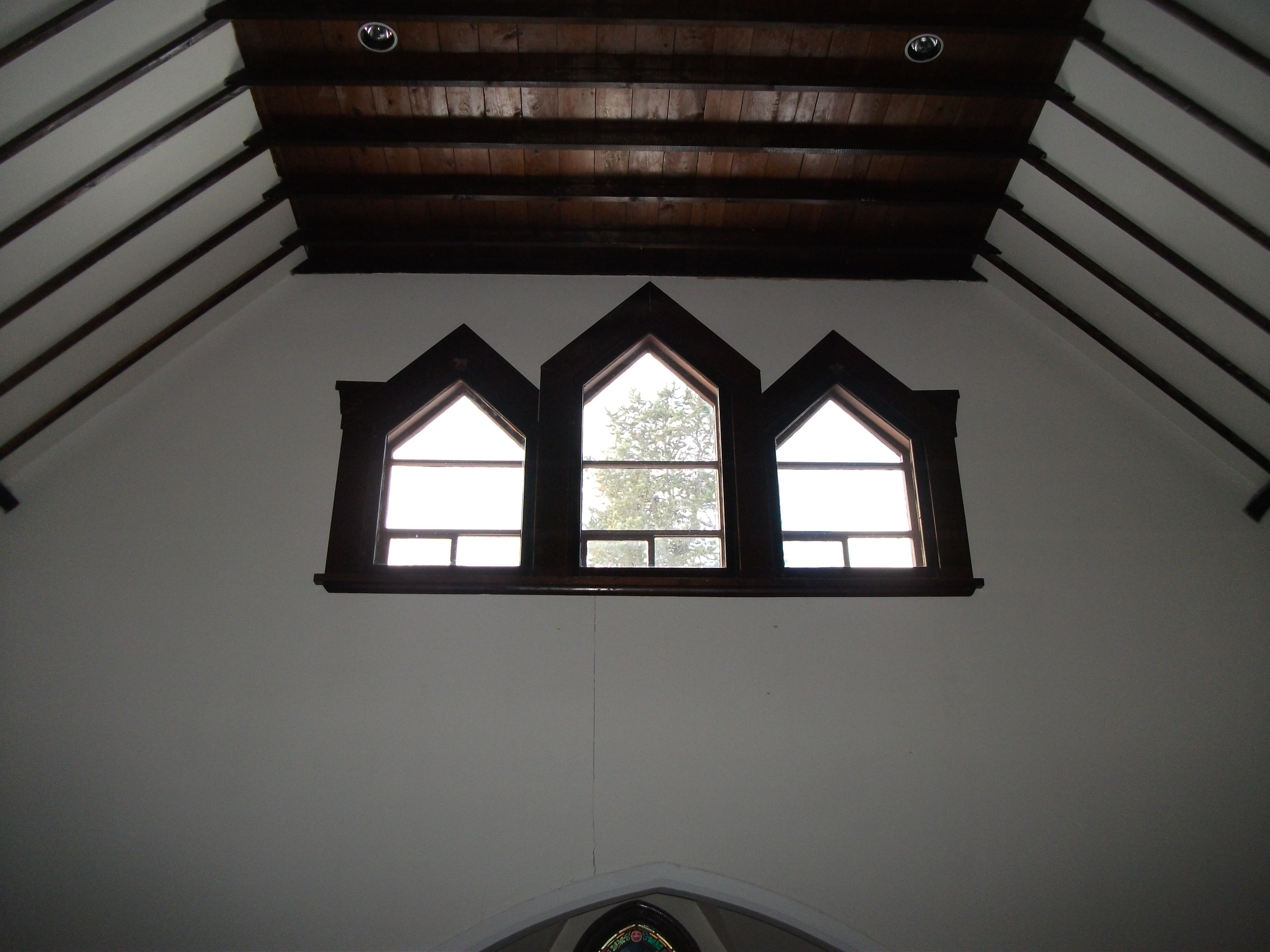
View of Clerestory above Baptistery

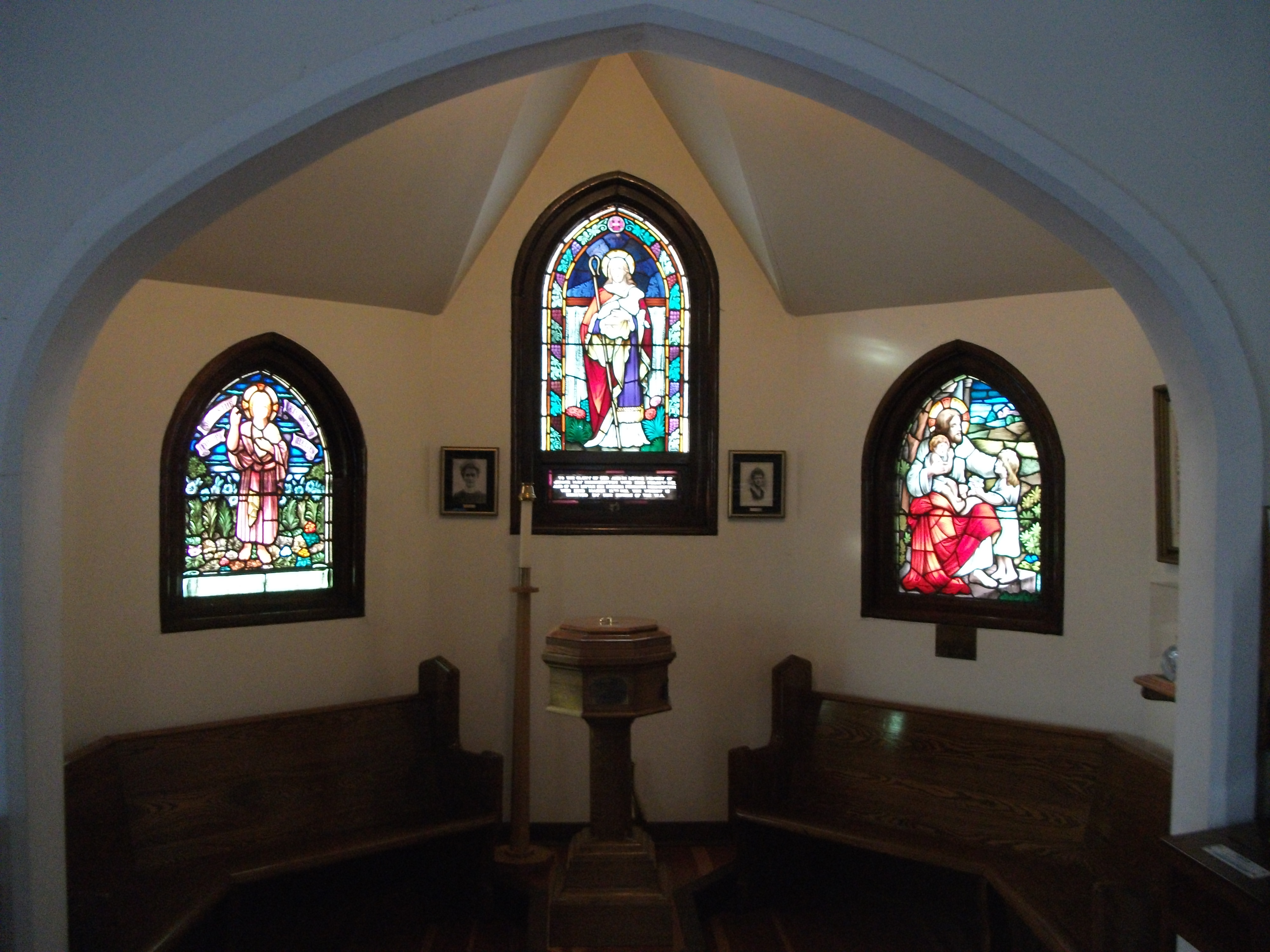
Baptistery (at Southwest apse)

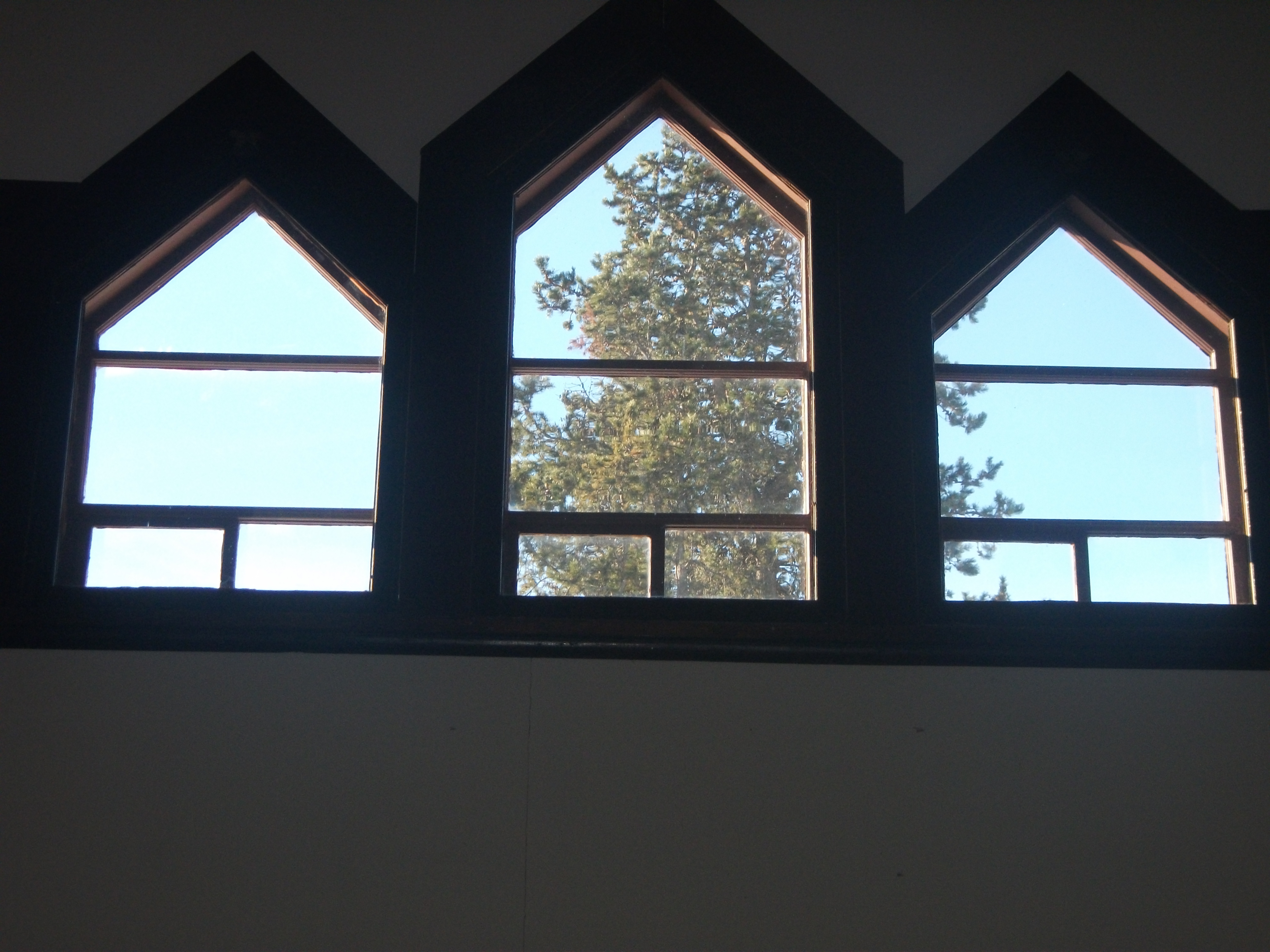
The three-pointed arch clerestory windows

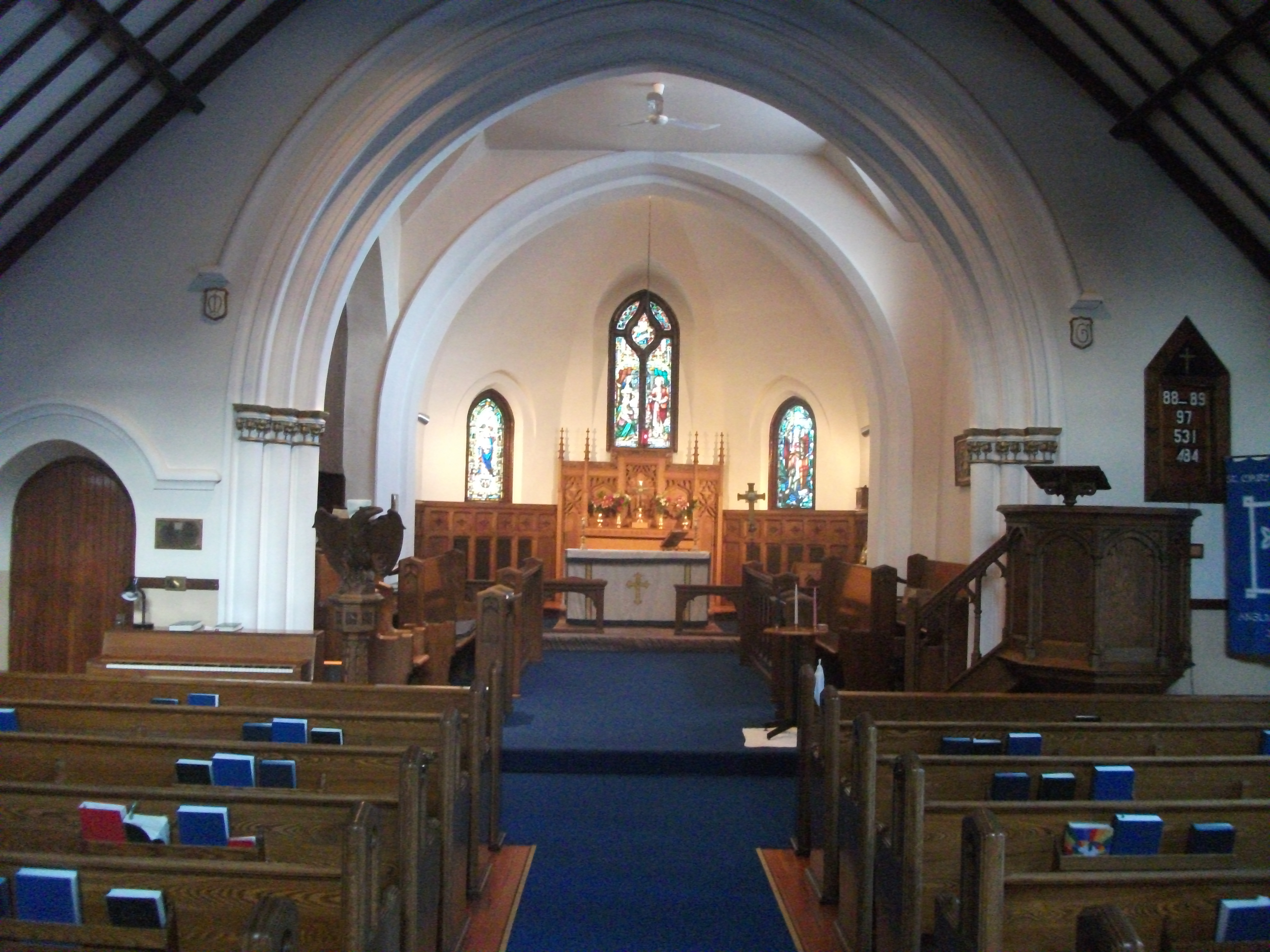
Nave towards the chancel

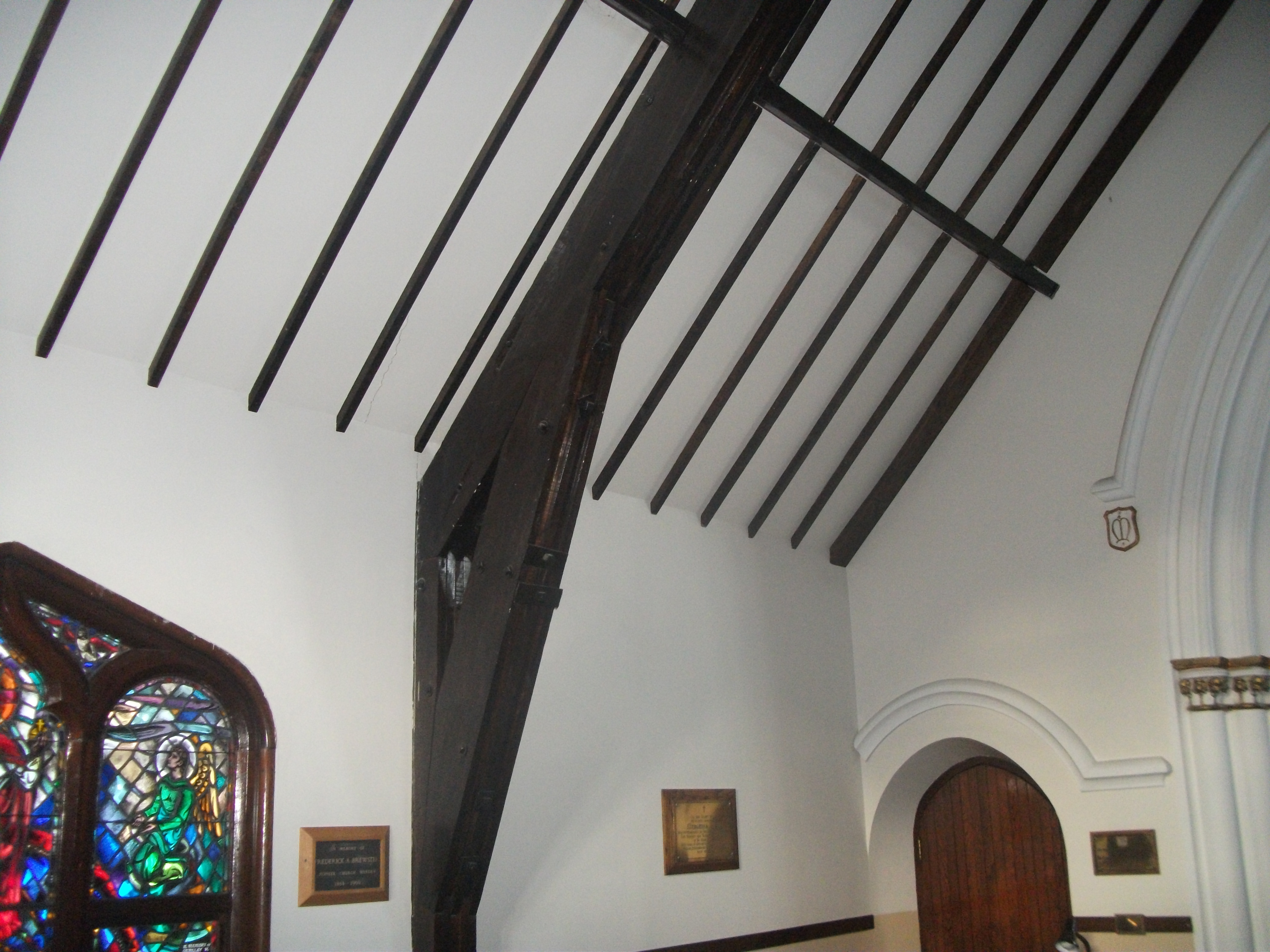
Exposed interior beams

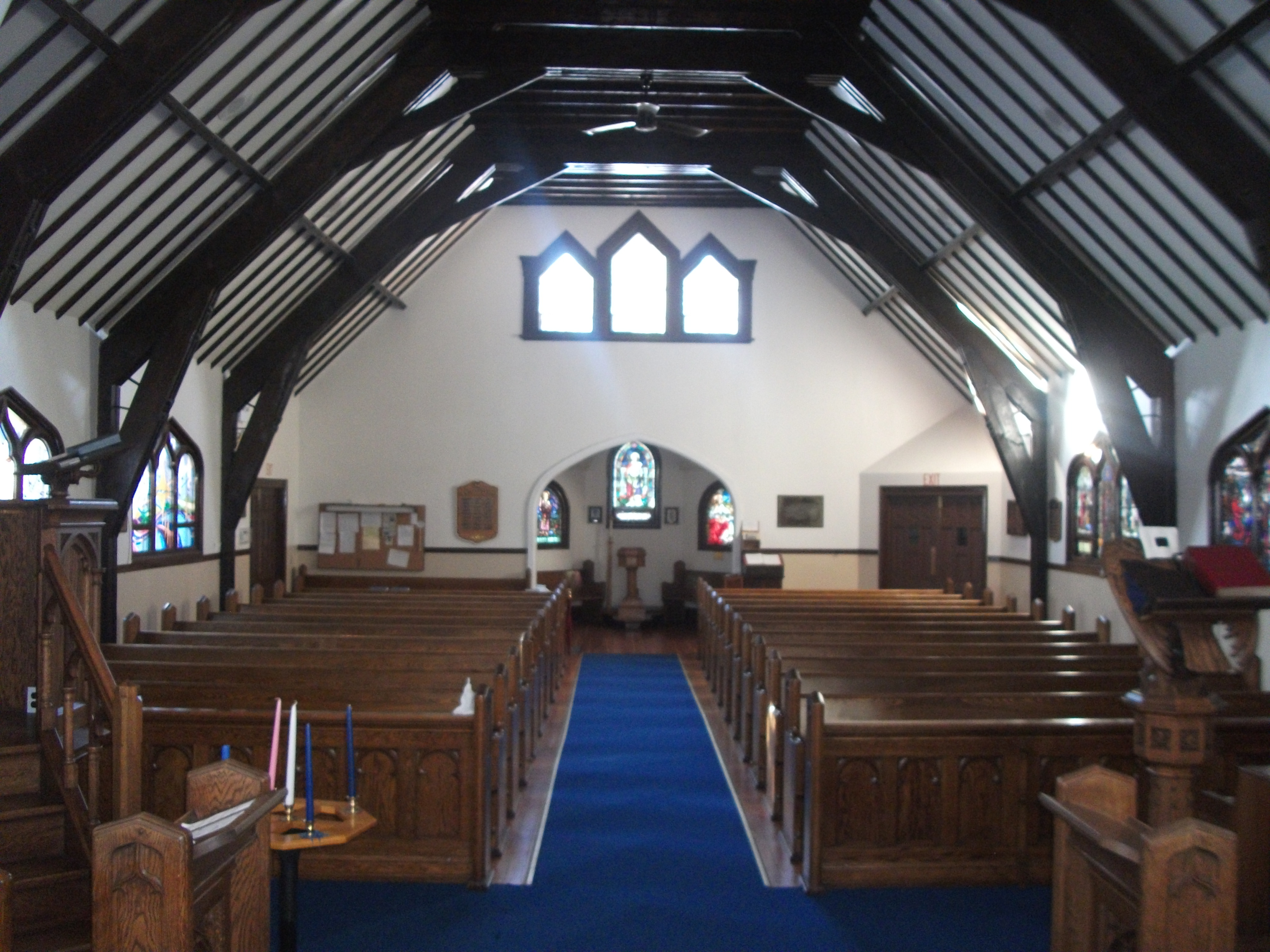
Nave towards baptistery

The basement along with the buttresses (two of which were topped with pinnacles) on both sides of the nave and the lower section of the tower were constructed with boulders which were exposed, adding to the general contrasting of textures (stucco, stone, half-timber exterior work)

The exterior of the roof was composed of flat, rectangular shingles laid in rows from the bottom edge of the roof up, with each successive higher row overlapping the joints in the row below. A small campanile was attached to the apex of the roof not only as an ornamental detail (as it did not have any bell) but as a significant symbolism for the mission of this parish, as this type of small roof campanile was particularly a characteristic element of missional church architecture.

The Edith Cavell Memorial Tower was Norman Gothic style (first intended to have double window system later during construction changed to a single window) crowned with battlements, and with sloping diagonal or "French" buttresses (at 45 degrees to the walls).

The church measured 26 m long and 15 m width; the tower 14 m in height; the seating capacity was 150.

== See also ==
- List of historic places in Alberta
- List of landmarks destroyed or damaged by climate change

== Citations ==
- Kordan, Diana; Gilpin, John (January 1984), Church of St. Mary & St. George Jasper, Alberta, The Designation Historical Agenda Paper, Settlement Survey Ltd
- Nichols, Trevor (August 20, 2014), "Century-long history", Jasper FitzHugh
- Smith, Cindi (March 1985), A Parish History of the Church of St. Mary and St. George, Jasper, Alberta, Jasper Yellowhead Historical Society
