= Sanxi, Jingde County =

Sanxi 三溪镇
- Town
- Location in China
- Coordinates: 30°22′52″N 118°26′23″E
- Country: People's Republic of China
- Province: Anhui
- Prefecture-level city: Xuancheng
- County: Jingde

Area
  - Total: 70.01 km^{2} (27.03 sq mi)

Population (2017)
  - Total: 13,083
  - Density: 186.9/km^{2} (484.0/sq mi)
- Time zone: UTC+08:00 (China Standard)
- Postal code: 242601
- Area code: 0563

Chinese name
- Simplified Chinese: 三溪镇
- Traditional Chinese: 三溪鎮
Transcriptions
Standard Mandarin
- Hanyu Pinyin: Sānxī Zhèn

Sanxi (Chinese: 三溪镇) is a town in Jingde County, Anhui, China. As of the 2016 census it had a population of 13,083 and an area of 70.01 square kilometres (27.03 sq mi). It is only 62-square-kilometre (24 sq mi) away from Huangshan Scenic Spot. It borders Caijiaqiao Town in the East, Suncun Town in the south, Xinglong Town in the West and Langqiao Town of Jing County in the north.

== Etymology ==
Sanxi means three streams. It is named Sanxi because Hui Stream, Linxi Stream, and Yu Stream meet and flow into the Jing River in the town.

== Administrative division ==
It includes thirteen villages and one community:

- Sanxikou Community (三溪口社区)
- Gaoxi (高溪村)
- Shangyu (上余村)
- Baishu (柏树村)
- Guantang (冠塘村)
- Junlin (军林村)
- Jiangfu (姜福村)
- Gaoqiao (高桥村)
- Zanghe (藏河村)
- Yaji (丫吉村)
- Hengshan (横山村)
- Lizhong (立中村)
- Baxiang (八湘村)
- Zhulin (竹林村)
- Huangchong (黄冲村)

== Geography ==
Hui Stream (徽水), Yu Stream (玉溪) and Linxi Stream (麟溪河) flow through the town.

== Economy ==
The local food crops are rice, rape, peanuts, and beans.

The town is rich in lead, zinc, quartz, amethyst, and sandstone.

== Transportation ==
National Highway G205 passes across the town.

== Attractions ==
Lecheng Bridge is a famous scenic spot in Anhui province. It was originally built in 1543 during the Jiajing period of the Ming dynasty (1638–1644) and rebuilt in the reign of Kangxi Emperor of the Qing dynasty (1644–1911). The bridge was destroyed by floods on July 6, 2020.
