= Cultural heritage at risk from climate change =

Climate-related loss of heritage sites

Many cultural heritage sites are suffering damage or loss due to anthropogenic climate change. Causes include sea rises and coastal erosion, the increased incidence of extreme weather events such as storms and cyclones, changes in rainfall patterns, extreme periods of drought, and bushfires.

Climate change is an increasing focus of cultural heritage organisations such as the International Council on Monuments and Sites (ICOMOS). UNESCO's List of World Cultural Heritage in Danger includes "threatening impacts of climatic, geological or other environmental factors" as a category of threat.

Sites at risk of loss or damage due to climate change are often also at risk from other social and political factors, such as war, land use and agricultural practices, and tourism.

== Africa ==
=== Kilva Kisiwani, Tanzania ===
Sea level rise and coastal erosion are causing loss of structures and archaeological material in the historic port city of Kilwa Kisiwani. Portions of some monuments are already underwater. Mitigation strategies under development include engineered structures (gabions) to minimise the effect of wave action.

== Americas ==
=== Chan Chan archeological site, Peru ===
The ancient city site of Chan Chan has experienced both more extreme rainfall and periods of drought, due to El Nino weather patterns. This area has always experienced extreme weather events, but the frequency of events is increasing. Rising groundwater is destabilising building foundations. Mitigation has included strategies to control the rising water table, stabilisation of perimeter walls, architectural documentation, local skills development and awareness-building campaigns, and a disaster preparedness plan.

=== Ivvavik /Vuntut/Herschel Island (Qikiqtaruk), Canada ===
Due to decrease of sea areas and higher exposure to storms, the 19th century whalers' settlement of Hershel Island had to be relocated inland to keep the buildings dry and avoid flooding of low lying structures. If coastal erosion continues another relocation might be needed and lead to the abandonment of some structures. The deterioration of the permafrost compromises grave structures and leads to buried caskets tumbling and breakage. (Case studies on climate change and World Heritage, UNESCO)

== Asia Pacific ==
The ancient mud-walled structures of the Tabo monastery, which are vulnerable to increasing incidence of rainfall.

=== Tabo monastery, India ===
Ancient murals and mud-based walls of the Tabo monastery of the Spiti valley (Indian Himalayas), which date back to the 10th century AD, have been partly damaged due to increased rainfall in this cold desert during recent decades, which has been attributed to climate change.

=== Halji monastery, Nepal ===
This Tibetan Buddhist monastery, which is located in Nepal's remote Limi valley and dates back to the 11th century AD, has been threatened since the mid-2000s by repeated Glacial Lake Outburst Floods (GLOFs), which have been induced by climate change.

=== Mosque City of Bagerhat, Bangladesh ===
Building structures in the Mosque City of Bagerhat are decaying due to rising water and soil salinity. Salt crystals that become embedded in the rock expand in the presence of moisture and hasten the disintegration and weathering of stone buildings.

=== Rapa Nui, Polynesia ===
Also known as Easter Island, Rapa Nui has been a World Heritage Site since 1995. The stone statues on Rapa Nui are threatened by sea level rise and coastal damage from storms. An increase in ocean swells and wave heights causes undercutting and erosion of rock faces and loss of archaeological remains.

== Europe ==
=== Coastal Great Britain ===
Increased coastal erosion and rising sea levels threaten several historic castles in Great Britain, including Hurst Castle in Hampshire, Tintagel in Cornwall, Piel Castle in Cumbria, Bayard's Cove Fort in Devon, Garrison Walls in the Isles of Scilly and Calshot Castle in Southampton. According to site managers English Heritage, it will be necessary to repair walls and improve defences against storms to prevent further damage.

=== Edinburgh, Scotland ===
Increased rainfall and extreme weather events are also increasing the risk of flooding and slope instability in the old city of Edinburgh. Annual rainfall has increased 13% since 1970. Increased wetting and drying is eroding the sandstone used to build Edinburgh Castle and eroding the volcanic rock on which it is built.

=== Venice, Italy ===
Rising sea water and inundation threaten the city of Venice and its lagoon.

== See also ==
- List of landmarks destroyed or damaged by climate change
