= Lecheng Bridge =

- Crossed: Hui River
- Locale: Sanxi Town of Jingde County, Anhui, China

Characteristics
- Design: Arch bridge Stone bridge
- Total length: 156 m (512 ft)
- Width: 6.2 m (20 ft)

History
- Construction end: 1543
- Collapsed: July 6, 2020

Chinese name
- Traditional Chinese: 樂成橋
- Simplified Chinese: 乐成桥
Transcriptions
Standard Mandarin
- Hanyu Pinyin: Lènchéng Qiáo

Lecheng Bridge (Chinese: 乐成桥; pinyin: Lènchéng Qiáo) was a stone arch bridge in Sanxi Town of Jingde County, Anhui, China. It spanned the Hui River. It was 156 m (512 ft) long and 6.2 m (20 ft) wide.

== History ==
Lecheng Bridge was originally built in 1543, in the 22nd year of Jiajing period of the Ming dynasty. In the early Qing dynasty, it was damaged by catastrophic floods and was rebuilt in the reign of the Kangxi Emperor. It was designated as a provincial level cultural heritage by the government of Anhui in 2004. On July 6, 2020, it was destroyed by floods.
