= Mount Qiyun =

Taoist mountain in Anhui, China

Coordinates: 29.8083°N 118.033°E

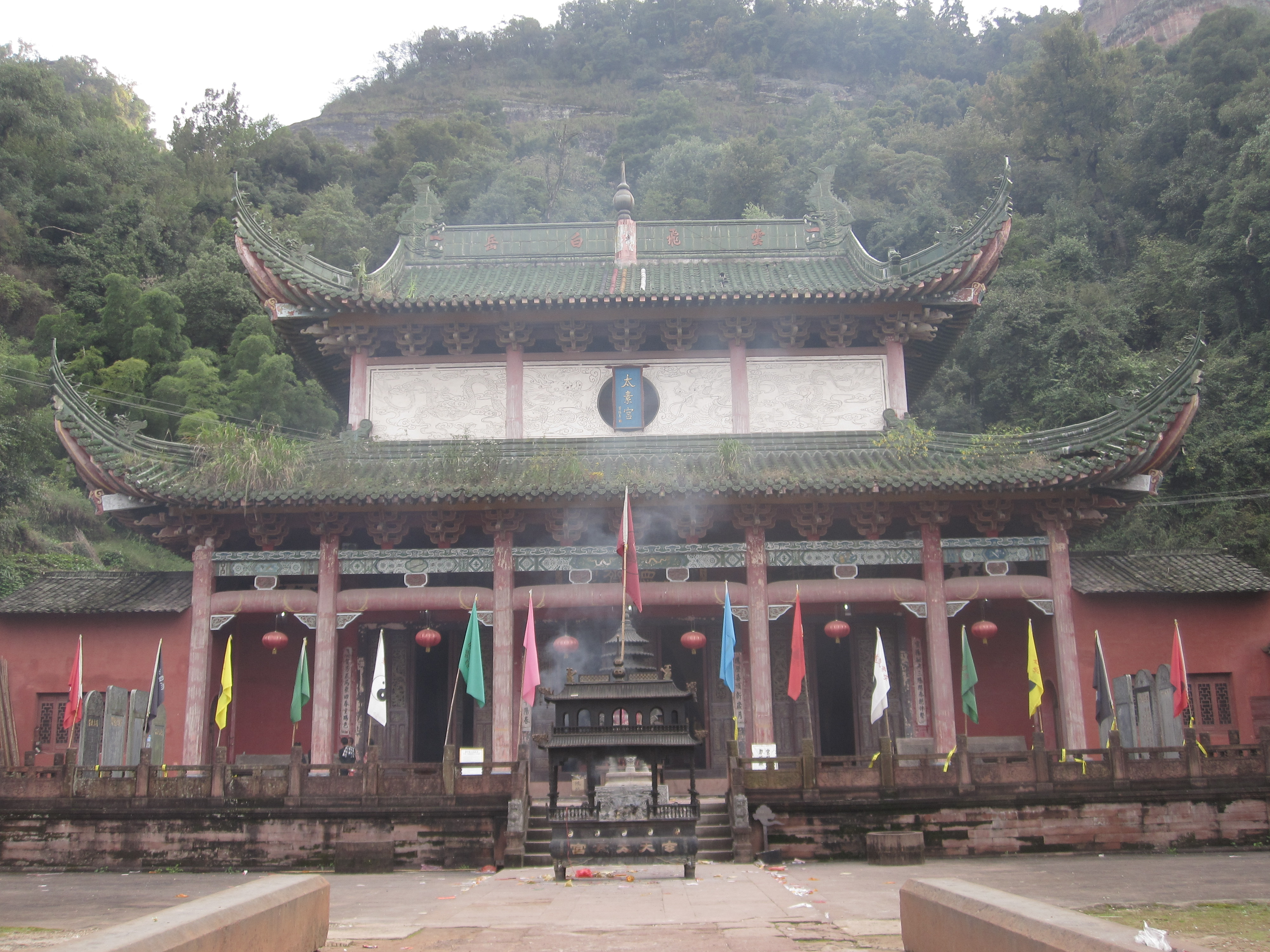
- A Taoist temple on the mountain

Highest point
- Elevation: 585 m (1,919 ft)

Geography
- Location: Xiuning County, Anhui Province, China

Mount Qiyun (simplified Chinese: 齐云山; traditional Chinese: 齊雲山; pinyin: Qíyún Shān; lit. 'Cloud-High Mountain') is a mountain and national park located in Xiuning County in Anhui Province, China. It lies at the foot of the Huangshan mountain range some 33 kilometres (21 mi) to the west of Huangshan City and is known as one of the Four Sacred Mountains of Taoism. The mountain is noted for its numerous inscriptions and tablets, as well as monasteries and temples, particularly dedicated to Xuantian Shangdi. The highest point of the mountain rises to 585 metres (1,919 ft).

== Culture ==
Through Chinese history, Chinese poets and writers including Li Bai, Tang Yin and Yu Dafu have visited Mount Qiyun either to compose poetry or to leave an inscription.
