= Xiuning County =

Xiuning 休宁县 Siuning
- County
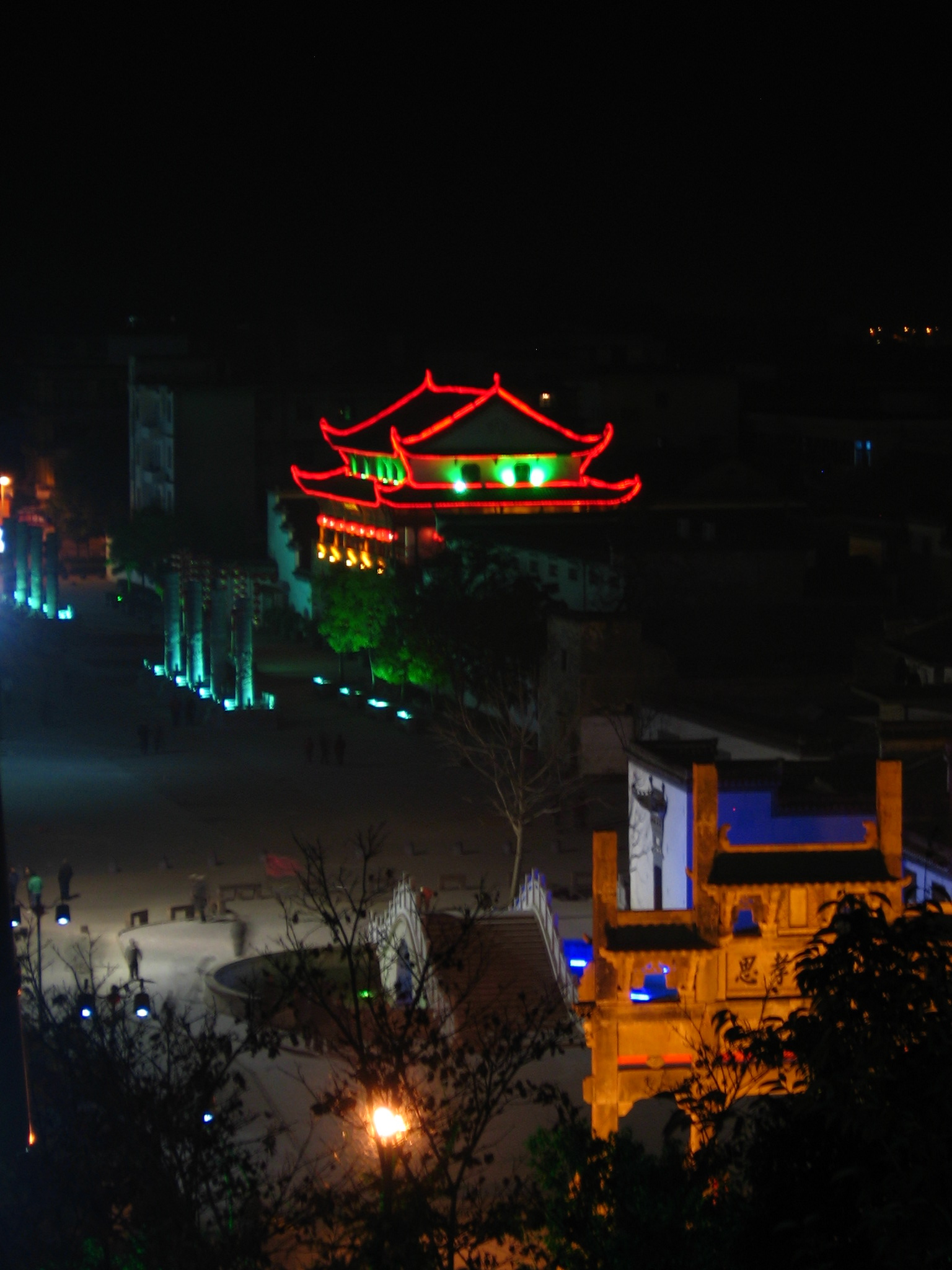

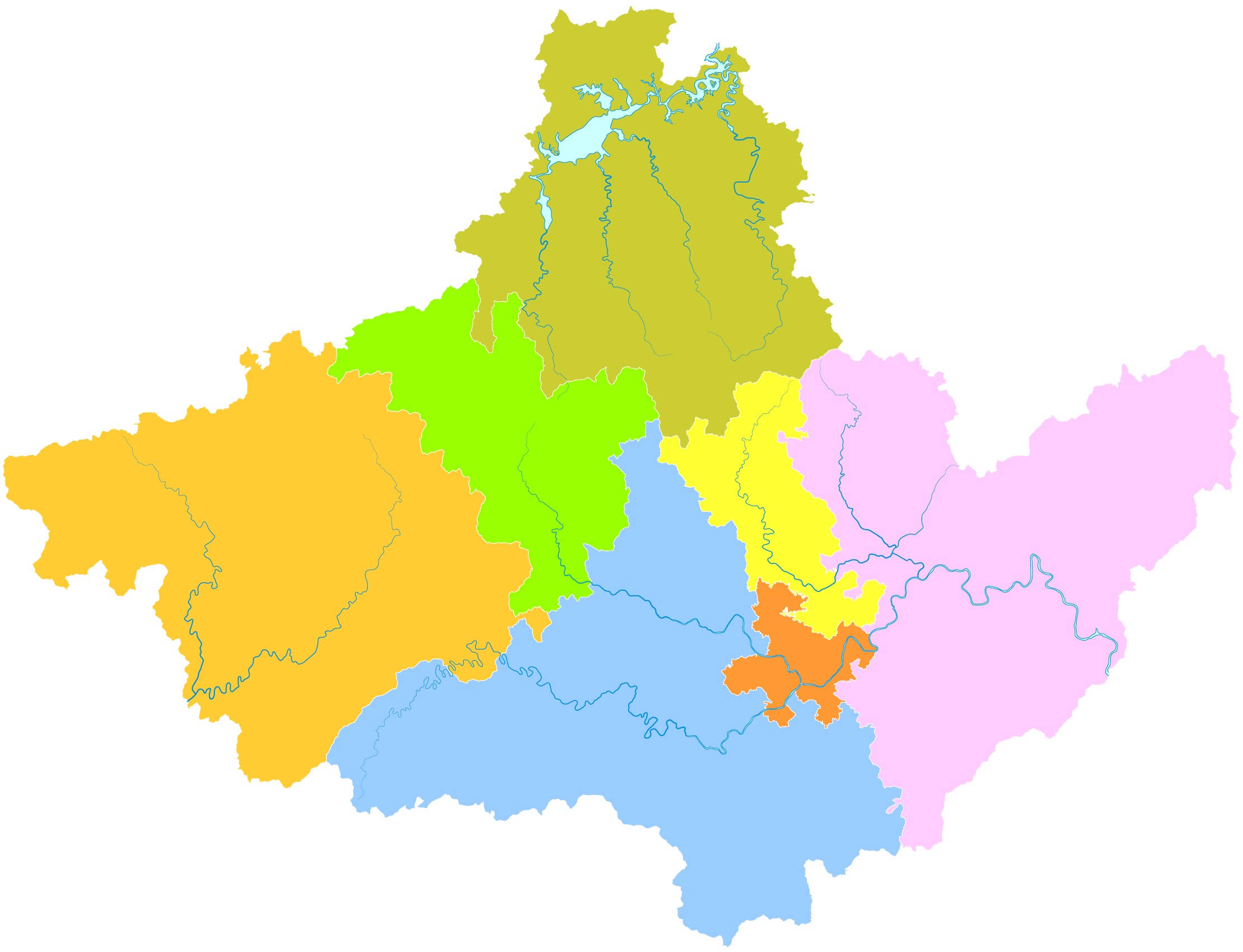
- Xiuning is the southernmost division in this map of Huangshan

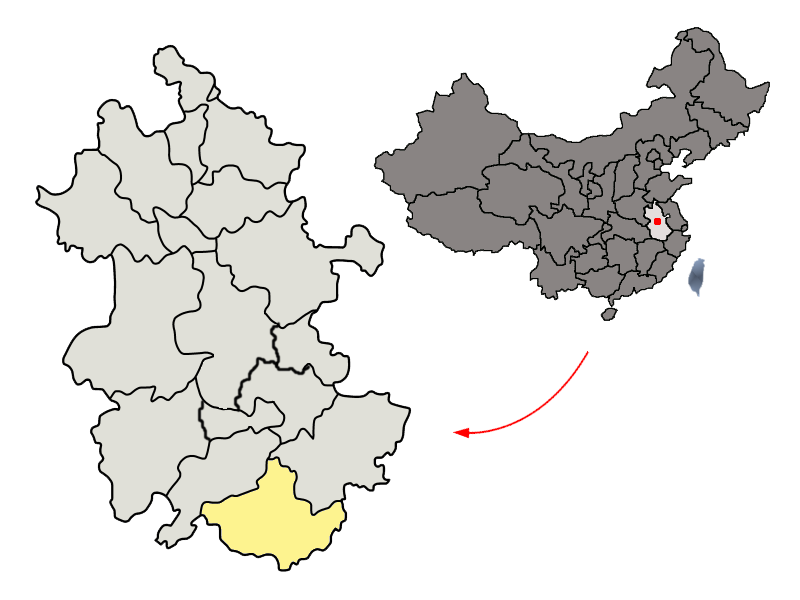
- Huangshan in Anhui
- Coordinates: 29°47′02″N 118°11′38″E
- Country: China
- Province: Anhui
- Prefecture-level city: Huangshan
- County seat: Haiyang

Area
  - Total: 2,151 km^{2} (831 sq mi)

Population (2020)
  - Total: 211,456
  - Density: 98.31/km^{2} (254.6/sq mi)
- Time zone: UTC+8 (China Standard)
- Postal code: 245400

Xiuning County (simplified Chinese: 休宁县; traditional Chinese: 休寧縣; pinyin: Xiūníng Xiàn) is a county in the south of Anhui Province, China, under the jurisdiction of the prefecture-level city of Huangshan City. The southernmost county-level division in the province, it has a population of 270,000 and an area of 2,125 square kilometres (820 sq mi). The government of Xiuning County is located in Haiyang Town (海阳镇).

Xiuning County has jurisdiction over nine towns and twelve townships.

== Administrative divisions ==
Xiuning County is divided to 10 towns and 11 townships.

Towns

- Haiyang (海阳镇)
- Qiyunshan (齐云山镇)
- Wan'an (万安镇)
- Wucheng (五城镇)
- Lantian (兰田镇)
- Donglinxi (东临溪镇)
- Xikou (溪口镇)
- Liukou (流口镇)
- Wangcun (汪村镇)
- Shangshan (商山镇)

Townships

- Weiqiao Township (渭桥乡)
- Shandou Township (山斗乡)
- Lingnan Township (岭南乡)
- Yuanfang Township (源芳乡)
- Yucun Township (榆村乡)
- Huangjian Township (璜尖乡)
- Longtian Township (龙田乡)
- Baiji Township (白际乡)
- Chenxia Township (陈霞乡)
- Banqiao Township (板桥乡)
- Hecheng Township (鹤城乡)

== History and culture ==
Xiuning County is historically renowned for producing more zhuàngyuán (状元: the scholar with the highest score in the national Imperial examination), than any other place in China. Accordingly, the large public space in Haiyang Town is called Zhuangyuan Square (状元广场).

In 2009, the Xiuning County People's Government unveiled a monument commemorating the 1800th anniversary of Xiuning (208-2008).

== Climate ==
Climate data for Xiuning, elevation 170 m (560 ft), (1991–2020 normals, extremes 1981–present)
Month	Jan	Feb	Mar	Apr	May	Jun	Jul	Aug	Sep	Oct	Nov	Dec	Year
Record high °C (°F)	23.4 (74.1)	27.9 (82.2)	34.0 (93.2)	33.6 (92.5)	36.2 (97.2)	37.2 (99.0)	40.4 (104.7)	39.9 (103.8)	38.6 (101.5)	35.9 (96.6)	30.3 (86.5)	22.9 (73.2)	40.4 (104.7)
Mean daily maximum °C (°F)	9.1 (48.4)	11.9 (53.4)	16.4 (61.5)	22.5 (72.5)	27.2 (81.0)	29.3 (84.7)	33.2 (91.8)	33.0 (91.4)	29.3 (84.7)	24.2 (75.6)	18.0 (64.4)	11.6 (52.9)	22.1 (71.9)
Daily mean °C (°F)	4.5 (40.1)	7.0 (44.6)	11.0 (51.8)	16.8 (62.2)	21.7 (71.1)	24.7 (76.5)	28.0 (82.4)	27.6 (81.7)	23.9 (75.0)	18.3 (64.9)	12.2 (54.0)	6.2 (43.2)	16.8 (62.3)
Mean daily minimum °C (°F)	1.2 (34.2)	3.3 (37.9)	7.0 (44.6)	12.4 (54.3)	17.4 (63.3)	21.1 (70.0)	24.1 (75.4)	23.8 (74.8)	19.8 (67.6)	13.9 (57.0)	7.9 (46.2)	2.3 (36.1)	12.9 (55.1)
Record low °C (°F)	−8.8 (16.2)	−7.1 (19.2)	−4.8 (23.4)	0.6 (33.1)	8.0 (46.4)	12.7 (54.9)	17.5 (63.5)	17.7 (63.9)	9.0 (48.2)	1.3 (34.3)	−4.3 (24.3)	−16.1 (3.0)	−16.1 (3.0)
Average precipitation mm (inches)	93.9 (3.70)	109.4 (4.31)	174.5 (6.87)	208.2 (8.20)	232.6 (9.16)	370.2 (14.57)	213.4 (8.40)	135.3 (5.33)	76.3 (3.00)	56.5 (2.22)	75.5 (2.97)	63.5 (2.50)	1,809.3 (71.23)
Average precipitation days (≥ 0.1 mm)	13.6	13.4	16.2	15.5	14.8	17.2	13.2	12.8	8.6	7.5	10.1	9.9	152.8
Average snowy days	3.3	2.0	0.3	0	0	0	0	0	0	0	0.1	1.2	6.9
Average relative humidity (%)	79	79	76	76	77	82	78	78	77	74	79	78	78
Mean monthly sunshine hours	92.7	92.4	110.2	124.3	141.1	114.7	186.4	184.1	158.8	154.7	124.1	116.9	1,600.4
Percentage possible sunshine	28	29	30	32	33	27	44	45	43	44	39	37	36
Source: China Meteorological Administration

== Western attention ==
In 2003, the Peabody Essex Museum, in Salem, Massachusetts, completed a 200 million dollar renovation and expansion, designed by architect Moshe Safdie, moving a 200-year-old 16-room Chinese house from Xiuning County to the grounds of the Museum. While in China this house was home to many generations who made a living in traveling to Shanghai and running a pawn brokers business (as stated by the movie shown at the Peabody Essex Museum after exiting Yin Yu Tang House).

In early 2008, the BBC broadcast a series of 5 documentaries on the life of pupils at schools in China. Called "Chinese School", the three schools documented were all located in Xiuning County: Xiuning High School, the top school in the county; Haiyang Middle/High School; and Ping Min Elementary School. This series was shown on BBC 4 and was received with mixed reactions, most of which were positive.

== Transportation ==
=== Rail ===
Xiuning is served by the Anhui–Jiangxi Railway.

== Tourist attractions ==
- Mount Qiyun is known as one of the Four Sacred Mountains of Taoism.
- Dengfeng Bridge is a historic stone arch bridge in the county.
