= Anfengtang reservoir =

Ancient construction in China

Coordinates: 32°19′39″N 116°41′00″E

Anfengtang Reservoir
- Interactive map of Anfengtang Reservoir
- Location: Huai River basin, China
- Type: Reservoir
- Basin countries: China

Anfengtang reservoir is an ancient reservoir located in Huai river basin of China. It was built during the Warring States period in 585 BC and is still under operation. The reservoir was originally called the Shaobei (meaning Peony flower). The dam was constructed with soil, woods and straws.
