= Jingde County =

Jingde 旌德县 Tsingteh
- County
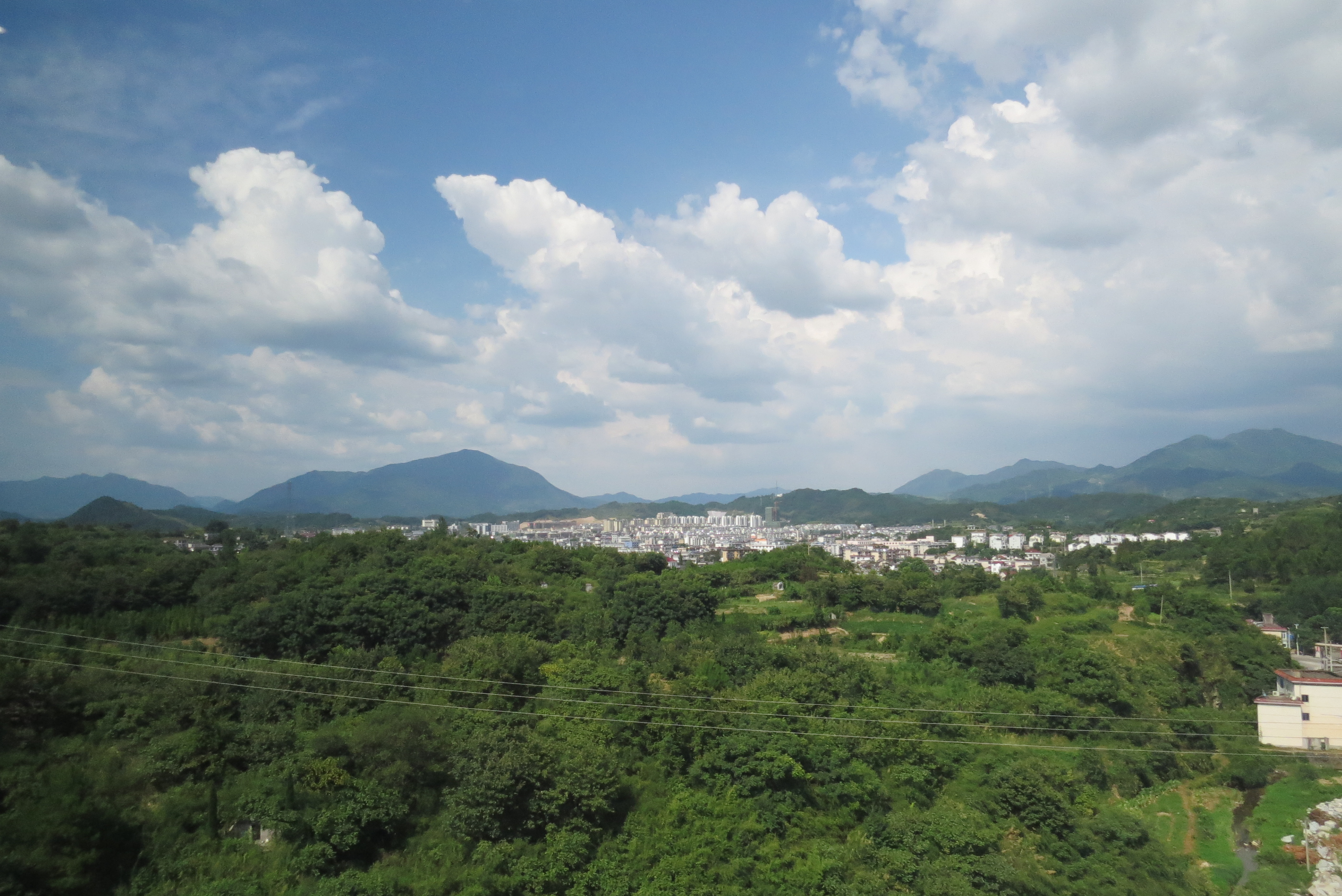
- Interactive map of Jingde
- Coordinates: 30°17′53″N 118°33′00″E
- Country: People's Republic of China
- Province: Anhui
- Prefecture-level city: Xuancheng

Area
  - Total: 904.8 km^{2} (349.3 sq mi)

Population (2018)
  - Total: 149,100
  - Density: 164.8/km^{2} (426.8/sq mi)
- Time zone: UTC+8 (China Standard)
- Postal code: 242600

Jingde County (Chinese: 旌德县; pinyin: Jīngdé Xiàn) is a county in the southeast of Anhui Province, People's Republic of China, under the jurisdiction of the prefecture-level city of Xuancheng. It has a population of 150,000 and an area of 905 km^{2} (349 sq mi). The government of Jingde County is located in Jingyang Town.

== Administrative divisions ==
Jingde County is divided to 5 towns and 5 townships.

Towns

- Jingyang (旌阳镇)
- Baidi (白地镇)
- Sanxi (三溪镇)
- Miaoshou (庙首镇)
- Caijiaqiao (蔡家桥镇)

Townships

- Banshu Township (版书乡)
- Yucun Township (俞村乡)
- Suncun Township (孙村乡)
- Xinglong Township (兴隆乡)
- Yunle Township (云乐乡)

== Climate ==
Climate data for Jingde, elevation 220 m (720 ft), (1991–2020 normals, extremes 1981–present)
Month	Jan	Feb	Mar	Apr	May	Jun	Jul	Aug	Sep	Oct	Nov	Dec	Year
Record high °C (°F)	24.4 (75.9)	27.6 (81.7)	32.9 (91.2)	33.1 (91.6)	36.2 (97.2)	36.9 (98.4)	40.4 (104.7)	41.1 (106.0)	39.0 (102.2)	34.3 (93.7)	30.5 (86.9)	23.9 (75.0)	41.1 (106.0)
Mean daily maximum °C (°F)	8.8 (47.8)	11.7 (53.1)	16.3 (61.3)	22.4 (72.3)	27.1 (80.8)	29.3 (84.7)	33.2 (91.8)	32.7 (90.9)	28.6 (83.5)	23.5 (74.3)	17.7 (63.9)	11.4 (52.5)	21.9 (71.4)
Daily mean °C (°F)	3.6 (38.5)	6.1 (43.0)	10.4 (50.7)	16.3 (61.3)	21.2 (70.2)	24.5 (76.1)	27.9 (82.2)	27.1 (80.8)	22.9 (73.2)	17.2 (63.0)	11.2 (52.2)	5.4 (41.7)	16.2 (61.1)
Mean daily minimum °C (°F)	0.1 (32.2)	2.2 (36.0)	6.1 (43.0)	11.6 (52.9)	16.7 (62.1)	20.8 (69.4)	24.0 (75.2)	23.5 (74.3)	19.1 (66.4)	12.9 (55.2)	6.9 (44.4)	1.3 (34.3)	12.1 (53.8)
Record low °C (°F)	−9.5 (14.9)	−9.6 (14.7)	−5.9 (21.4)	−0.2 (31.6)	7.1 (44.8)	11.3 (52.3)	18.1 (64.6)	17.0 (62.6)	8.5 (47.3)	0.1 (32.2)	−5.4 (22.3)	−15.1 (4.8)	−15.1 (4.8)
Average precipitation mm (inches)	76.8 (3.02)	85.4 (3.36)	139.0 (5.47)	144.8 (5.70)	169.1 (6.66)	278.4 (10.96)	219.2 (8.63)	146.6 (5.77)	89.5 (3.52)	55.6 (2.19)	65.9 (2.59)	51.2 (2.02)	1,521.5 (59.89)
Average precipitation days (≥ 0.1 mm)	12.6	12.6	15.9	14.5	14.0	15.9	14.0	14.7	10.7	8.6	10.1	9.8	153.4
Average snowy days	5.2	3.0	1.1	0.1	0	0	0	0	0	0	0.3	2.2	11.9
Average relative humidity (%)	78	77	75	74	76	80	78	80	80	78	79	76	78
Mean monthly sunshine hours	100.5	102.2	121.3	138.0	157.6	132.3	198.0	178.2	147.5	151.7	128.3	122.2	1,677.8
Percentage possible sunshine	31	32	32	35	37	32	46	44	40	43	41	39	38
Source: China Meteorological Administration
