= 2020 China floods =

2020 floods in China

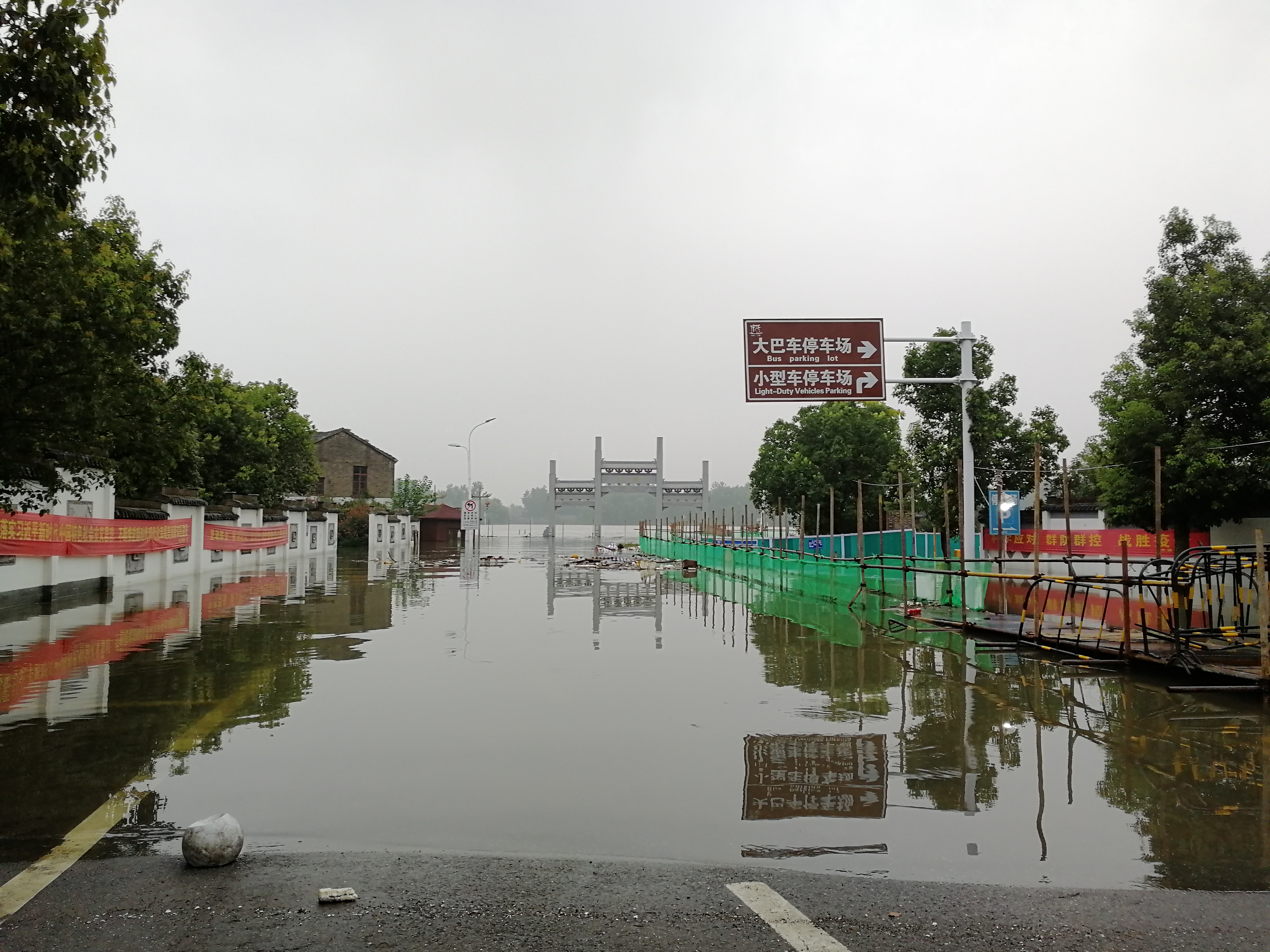
- Flooded Datong Ancient Town in Tongling, July 2020
- Date: early June – September 2020
- Location: Hunan, Jiangxi, Guangxi, Guizhou, Sichuan, Hubei, Chongqing, Anhui, Zhejiang, Fujian, and Yunnan
- Deaths: 219 dead or missing (as of 13 August 2020)
- Property damage: US$32 billion (as of 12 October 2020)

In early June 2020, heavy rains caused by the regional rainy season led to floods severely affecting large areas of southern China including the Yangtze basin and its tributaries. Rains and floods extended to central and eastern China during July and were described as the worst since at least 1998.

According to the Ministry of Emergency Management, by the end of June flooding had displaced 744,000 people across 26 provinces with 81 people missing or dead. As of 13 August, the floods have affected 63.46 million people and caused a direct economic loss of 178.96 billion CNY, which are 12.7% and 15.5% higher than the 2015–2019 average, respectively. 219 people were found dead or are missing, and 54,000 houses collapsed, which is 54.8% and 65.3% lower than the 2015–2019 average, respectively. The Ministry of Water Resources said that a total of 443 rivers nationwide have been flooded, with 33 of them swelling to the highest levels ever recorded. According to statistics from the National Cultural Heritage Administration (NCHA), 76 key national cultural relics and 187 provincial cultural heritage sites have suffered damage of varying degrees.

Affected regions include Guangxi, Guizhou, Sichuan, Hubei, and Chongqing. The regions include the upper and middle river basin of the Yangtze and its tributaries. With more rain, floods started to extend to lower regions of the Yangtze basin such as Anhui, Jiangxi, and Zhejiang. Hunan, Fujian, and Yunnan were also affected.

Provinces of China most severely affected by the 2020 floods

== Causes of floods ==
=== Natural causes ===
Hu Xiao from the China Meteorological Administration (CMA) indicated that the rains were caused by increased vapors arising from the Indian and Pacific oceans. Many experts believe that climate change due to human activity contributed to the severity of the flooding, and such events may become more frequent in the future.

=== Artificial causes ===
The local governments in recent years had made steps to implement nature-based flood mitigation strategies like tree planting, sponge cities and floodplain restoration. Experts have noted these measures did have some positive effect as the intensity of precipitation in 2020 is much higher than the rains that caused the 1998 floods, yet the flooding has been less serious and damaging. However, huge challenges in flood management and resilience remain. The Yangtze flows through some of the most productive agricultural, economic and industrial centers in China. With the rapid increase of population in China and breakneck economic growth, a large number of lakes and other wetlands had been reclaimed into farmland or urban development. The serious shrinkage and disappearance of lakes in the middle and lower reaches of the Yangtze River is an important reason for the aggravation of flood disasters. In 1915, Dongting Lake was 5,000-square-kilometre (1,900 sq mi). In 2000, it was only 2,625-square-kilometre (1,014 sq mi). In the 1950s, Poyang Lake was 4,350-square-kilometre (1,680 sq mi). In 2000, it was only 3,750-square-kilometre (1,450 sq mi). Hubei was once known as "The Province of a thousand of Lakes". In the late 1950s, there were 1,066 lakes in Hubei. By the early 1980s, only 309 were left.

== Three Gorges Dam ==
Water level and inflow of Three Gorges Dam

Multiple dams in the Yangtze river basin control floodwaters; the biggest and most important of these is the Three Gorges Dam with its catchment area of about 1,000,000-square-kilometre (390,000 sq mi). It was constructed not only for power generation but also for flood control. By the end of June, the dam had started to release floodwaters. While the CMA indicated flood discharge started on 29 June, satellite images suggest that floodgates were opened already five days earlier. Yichang, a city below the dam, experienced extensive flooding, raising questions about the effectiveness of the flood control by the dam. According to the company that manages the dam, the dam had been "effectively reducing the speed and extent of water level rises on the middle and lower reaches of the Yangtze". Critics, however, suggest that the dam is "not doing what it is designed for" and unable to deal with severe events. Other experts have pointed out that studies do show that the dam does help alleviate typical flooding during normal years and that the problem is not the design of the dam, but the public's expectation that the dam alone can solve all the problems of flooding on the Yangtze. Significant amounts of rainfall occurred downstream of the Three Gorges Dam in the middle and lower reaches of the Yangtze which will never pass through the dam. During July, three flood waves from rains in the upper Yangtze basin arrived at the dam, necessitating the opening of sluice gates multiple times to create space in the reservoir. In Chinese social media it was claimed that this exacerbated downstream flooding, while the dam operators maintained that the action helped to delay floodwaters going downstream. On 15 August, "Flood #4" passed through the Three Gorges reservoir with a maximum inflow of 62,000 cubic meters per second, the highest reached at that time during this flood season. "Flood #5" passed the dam by 22 August when the reservoir's water level reached 167.85 metres, the highest level ever recorded.

According to a member of the expert committee of the state-sanctioned National Disaster Reduction Centre, the restrictions in human flow during the COVID-19 pandemic in mainland China halted regular dam maintenance, dam inspection, training of officials and the construction of hydraulic projects, which were scheduled in the winter and spring of 2020.

== Flooding by province ==
=== Anhui ===
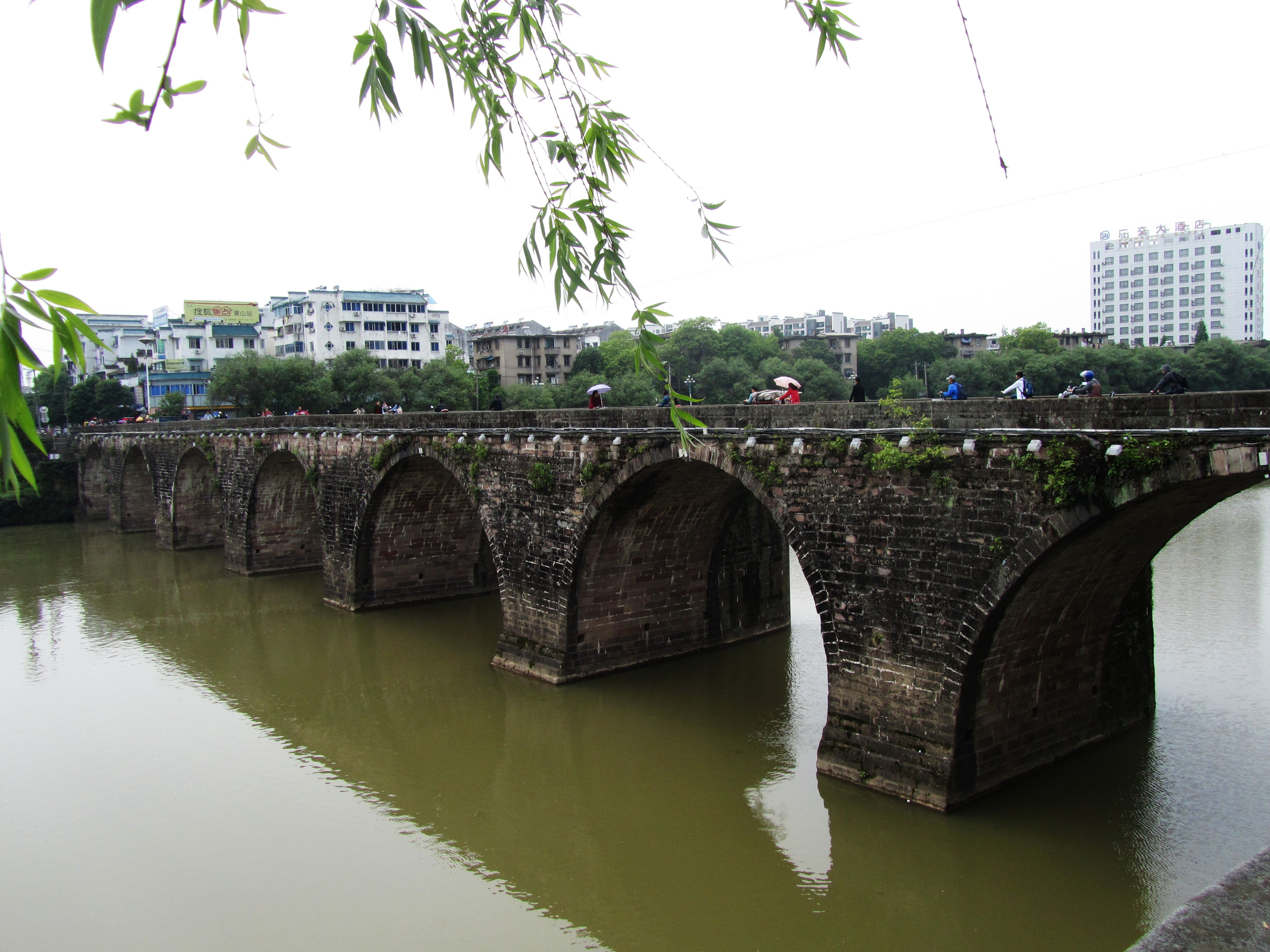
Zhenhai Bridge in April 2013

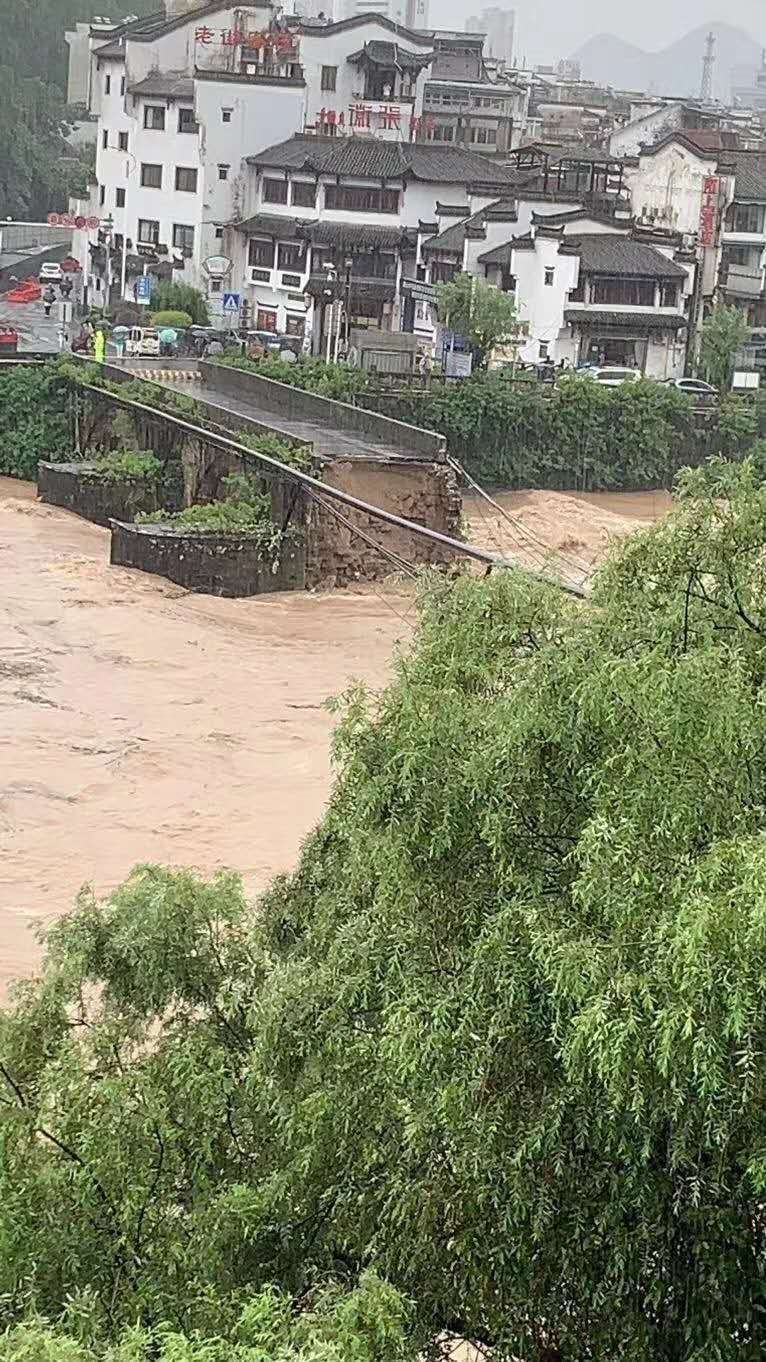
After flooding

On 7 July, Waterlogging in the She County.

On 27 June, a 3-hour total of 118 millimetres (4.6 in) of rain was recorded in Hefei Economic and Technological Development Zone, of which 94 millimetres (3.7 in) was recorded during 1.5 h from 17:30 p.m. to 19:00 p.m. Some road sections and communities were submerged.

On 6 July, Lecheng Bridge, a Qing dynasty stone arch bridge and provincial cultural relics protection unit in Sanxi Town of Jingde County, was destroyed. On 7 July, some houses along the Shuiyang River in Xuanzhou District of Xuancheng were submerged.

On 7 July, several reservoirs in She County filled over capacity and reached record levels, requiring large releases of water to alleviate the dangerously high storage of water. Homes in She County were inundated. The first day of the National College Entrance Examination (Gaokao) was postponed due to hard rain. On 7 July 2020, Zhenhai Bridge, a large stone arch bridge in Tunxi District of Huangshan City and a "Major Historical and Cultural Site Protected at the National Level in Anhui", was destroyed by mountain torrents.

On 9 July, the Yaodu and Longquan rivers in Dongzhi County exceeded their highest recorded water levels.

All residents in Laozhou Township and Xuba Township of Tongling along the Yangtze River were ordered to evacuate on 11 July.

On 14 July, an emergency was issued by the Office of Anhui Provincial Flood Control and Drought Relief, which ordered all residents living in the central island of the Yangtze River or along the Yangtze River in Anqing, Chizhou, Tongling, Wuhu and Maanshan to evacuate.

On 16 July, in Tietong Township of Zongyang County, all the remaining 2,272 people were evacuated except 176 left behind.

On 18 July, the Huai River Commission of the Ministry of Water Resources raised the flood-control response from Level III to Level II.

On 19 July, the Government of Quanjiao County blasted several gaps in Chu River Levee to release floods.

At 8:32 am on 20 July, the Government of Nan County opened sluice gates at Wangjia Dam on the Huai River because water there was building up to too high a level. The last flood discharge was 13 years ago.

At 10:24 a.m. on 21 July, the water level at Zhongmiao Station of Chaohu reached 13.36-metre (43.8 ft), which is the once-in-a-century water level of Chaohu.

On 22 July, five excavators were washed away by the flood in Shida Levee, Lujiang County. That same day, firefighter Chen Lu was swept away by the flood while searching for trapped people in Lujiang County.

On 23 July, in Chaohu, affected by the continuous heavy rainfall, the water level of the Zhegao River rose and streets of Zhegao Town were submerged.

=== Chongqing ===
At 20:00 p.m. on 22 June, the Qijiang Wucha Hydrological Station in Jiasi Town recorded a water level of 205.85 metres (675.4 ft), which was 5.34 metres (17.5 ft) higher than the safe water level (200.51 metres (657.8 ft)). The Qijiang Wucha Hydrological Station reached 205.85 metres (675.4 ft), topping the previous record of 205.55 metres (674.4 ft) in 1998 China floods. On 22 June, parts of Qijiang District's Wenlong Subdistrict were submerged, with some roads underwater. 13,874 residents in Qijiang District along the Qi River were ordered to evacuate on 22 June.

On 15 July, hundreds of homes in Miaoba Town of Chengkou County were evacuated due to catastrophic rain and floods.

At 15:00 p.m. on 17 July, floods burst a bridge in Baojia Town of Pengshui Miao and Tujia Autonomous County, a man fell into the river and disappeared.

On 27 July, affected by persistent heavy rainfall, the first floor of the shops in the town of Ciqikou alongside the Yangtze River were inundated. Parts of Yuzhong District and the entire Caiyuanba Building Materials Market and Fruit Market near the swollen river were inundated.

As of 16 August 2020 the center of the city of Chongqing was flooded under 1 to 2 metres (3 ft 3 in to 6 ft 7 in) of water after the Jialing River overflowed due to heavy rainfall.

On 20 August, the Cuntan Hydrological Station in Chongqing rose over the high of 191.41 metres (628.0 ft), which was set in 1981. Downtown streets, houses, parks, and wharves, were inundated.

=== Gansu ===
China National Highway 212 was partially washed away, effectively cutting off Wen County from the outside world for three days.

=== Fujian ===
From 11 to 14 June, a torrential rainfall hit Youyang Tujia and Miao Autonomous County and Shizhu Tujia Autonomous County. On 14 June, Huaxia Minzu School was inundated. On 22 June, homes in Youyang Tujia and Miao Autonomous County were also inundated.

On 9 July, a rainstorm occurred in Nanping, causing floods, landslides and other disasters, many roads were destroyed and crops were flooded. Wuyishan City had serious waterlogging, and the local government issued a rainstorm red warning signal, and Wuyishan Scenic Spot had been closed.

=== Guangdong ===
On 22 May, the largest one hour rainfall in 2020 in China is Huangpu Bridge of Guangzhou, 168-millimetre (6.6 in). Line 13 of Guangzhou Metro was shut down due to floodwater flowing into the subway tunnel.

At 11:00 a.m. on 8 June, roads and farmland in Lianxin Village of Linjiang Town in Heyuan were engulfed by floods. The Yonghan Levee on the Dong River collapsed, releasing an 3-metre (9.8 ft) to 5-metre (16 ft) wall of water. Flood surrounded Hekou Village of Yonghan Town in Longmen County, making it an island. Roads and highways were severely damaged or destroyed in Longmen County.

=== Guangxi ===
On 7 June, the daily rainfall in Yangshuo County of Guilin was 327.7-millimetre (12.90 in), breaking the local record of daily precipitation. Waterlogging occurred in several towns and townships, including Putao, Baisha and Jinbao. The county seat was underwater when the torrential rainfall hit. The dam of Shazixi Reservoir in Gaotian Town collapsed, 510 residents were forced to evacuate. Luojin Town and Baoli Township of Yongfu County were waterlogged. Maling Town and Hualong Town of Lipu alongside Maling River, Lipu River and Hualong River were besieged by flooding.

On 8 June, the Pingle Hydrological Station of Gui River rose to an all-time high of 105.87-metre (347.3 ft) and crossed the danger mark 6.37-metre (20.9 ft), surpassing the previous record set in 1936. National Highway G321 and G323, G65 Baotou–Maoming Expressway, and G59 Hohhot–Beihai Expressway were closed due to landslides. In Luorong Town of Yufeng District, Liuzhou, homes, streets and businesses was underwater when the torrential rainfall hit.

=== Guizhou ===
From 7:00 a.m. on 11 June to 7:00 a.m. on 12 June, a torrential rain of 264.6 millimetres (10.42 in) fell in Bifeng Town of Zheng'an County, with the maximum hourly rainfall of 163.3 millimetres (6.43 in), breaking the historical record of Guizhou in one hour. It is also China's largest one hour rainfall, after Guangzhou of 168 millimetres (6.6 in) on 22 May. Throughout the county, 8 people were killed and 5 were missing.

At 7:00 a.m. on 14 June, a total of 438,000 people in 51 counties of 8 cities in Guizhou were affected, 10 people died, 14 people were missing, 21,000 people were forced to evacuate; nearly 100 houses collapsed and more than 8,000 houses were badly damaged; 175,000 hectares (1,750 km^{2}) of crops were affected, including 28,000 hectares (280 km^{2}) will have no harvest; and the direct economic loss was 880 million yuan.

In 26 June, the torrential rainfall hit Rongjiang County, resulting in a direct economic loss of 4.8 million yuan due to rural roads in the county sustained major damage.

At 7:05 a.m. on 8 July, at least six people were killed when a landslide occurred in Shiban village of Songtao Miao Autonomous County.

On 12 July, portions of National Highway G212 in Meijiuhe Town of Renhuai was closed due to mountain flood. Loushanguan Scenic Spot was also closed.

=== Hubei ===
As of 13 July in Hubei province, at least 14 people were dead, and five others were missing. Over nine million people were affected.

At 7:00 p.m. on 5 July, the water level of Baiyanghe Reservoir rose to 84.62-metre (277.6 ft). At 12:00 p.m. on 6 July, the dam slipped and deformed, and 29,000 people were evacuated.

At 4 a.m. on 8 July, a landslide caused by heavy rainfall in Yuanshan village of Dahe Town in Huangmei County, killing eight people.

At 13:00 p.m. on 11 July, the water level of Chang Lake at Jingzhou reached 33.49-metre (109.9 ft), topping the previous record of 33.46-metre (109.8 ft) in 2016.

On 17 July, in Enshi City, the streets and cars were covered in water. All roads in and out of the city were closed.

At 8:00 a.m. on 20 August, the Three Gorges Dam saw an inflow of 75,000-cubic-metre (2,600,000 cu ft) per second, the largest flood peak since the construction of the dam.

=== Hunan ===
On 29 June, a rainstomm hit in Fenghang County, Xiangxe Tujea and Miao Autonomous Prefecture. The landscape and roads on both sides of Tuo River were inundated.

On 3 July, the Government of Hunaun launched a Level IV emergency response, the lowest in China's four-tier emergency response system, for flood control.

On 8 July, Madian Reservoir of Yueyang County received 303-millimetre (11.9 in) of rainfall in total, representing the highest accumulated rainfall since 1952.

On 8 July, in southwestern Hunan's Zhangjiajie, a man netting fish was swept away by the flood.

Hunan Hydrological and Water Resources Survey Center issued an orange flood warning at 12:20 p.m. on 11 July. At 2:00 p.m. on 11 July, Orange Isle was closed.

On 20 July, the Government of Hunan announced that as of 20 July, persistent heavy rainfall has affected more than 6.01 million people in 117 counties of 14 prefectures in Hunan, and more than 347,000 people have been transferred and resettled urgently.

=== Jiangxi ===
Jiangxi experienced major floods in July 2020, primarily along the Poyang Lake and its tributaries in Jiujiang, Shangrao, and Pingxiang.

At 0:00 a.m. on 12 July, the water level at Xingzi station of Poyang Lake reached 22.53 metres (73.9 ft), exceeding the record of 22.52 metres (73.9 ft) in 1998 China floods.

Residents were forced to evacuate Jiangzhou Town and Sanjiao Township of Jiujiang on 12 July as the flooded river began to overtake homes. Jiangzhou is an island in the middle of Yangtze River at the end of the Poyang lake, local government issued a call on social media for everyone from the town aged 18 to 60 to return and help fight the flood, citing a severe lack of hands to reinforce dams.

On 11 July, the Government of Jiangxi raised its flood-control response from level II to level I, the top level of China's four-tier emergency response for floods. Rao River rose to an all-time high of 22.65-metre (74.3 ft), crossing the danger mark and surpassing the previous record of 22.43-metre (73.6 ft) set in 1998. Parks, homes, and businesses in Poyang County were overtaken by the Rao River, leaving parts of the county accessible only by boat. The 73123 Army of the Eastern Theater Command Ground Force rushed to Poyang County to fight flood. In Dongzhi County, floods had affected more than 260,000 people, or about half of the county's population.

On the afternoon of 8 July, Qinghua Rainbow Bridge was devastated by flood. In the early morning of 9 July, the highest water level of Sandu Hydrological Station in Wuyuan County reached 62.74-metre (205.8 ft), exceeding the warning water level by 4.74-metre (15.6 ft).

=== Sichuan ===
On 17 June, heavy rain triggered mudslides and flooding that leaves 2 people missing in Danba County.

From 18 pm 26 June to 1 am on 27 June, a sudden rainstorm occurred in northern Mianning County. National Highway 248 collapsed in the county seat Gaoyang Subdistrict, causing two passing vehicles to fall into river. Only five of the ten passengers were rescued, two died and three were missing. As of 23:00 on 30 14 June people were killed and 8 people were missing in Gaoyang Subdistrict and Yihai Town. As of 1 July, 500 hectares (5.0 km^{2}) of crops were affected, 280 hectares (2.8 km^{2}) were damaged and 70 hectares (0.70 km^{2}) will have no harvest, more than 280 houses collapsed or badly damaged and 2,300 houses partially damaged.

On 6 4 July people were missing from the debris flow caused by floods in Zhailong Town of Xiaojin County.

On 16 July, in Tongchuan District of Dazhou, 7 people went swimming in the river and 2 people were washed away by floods.

In early August, continuous rainfall has caused 22 major rivers in Sichuan to exceed their flood warning levels. Ya'an and Leshan were underwater when the torrential rainfall hit. 100,000 people were evacuated.

On 17 August, in Leshan, floods affected the Leshan Giant Buddha, flood water reached the toes of the Buddha statue for the first time since the establishment of the Communist State in 1949. Local police and scenic area staff placed sandbags at the platform under the statue's feet, building a dam-like structure to protect it.

On 18 August, the Government of Sichuan launched its Level I emergency response, which is the first time in the history of Sichuan. In Jiuzhaigou County, the Jiuzhaigou Valley Scenic and Historic Interest Area announced temporary closure due to safety concerns. The Yan'an section of Qingyi River was hit by a major flood rarely seen in a hundred years. The lower reaches of Dadu River and Min River were exceeded warning levels. In Pingshan County of Yibin, the government evacuated 2,400 of its residents due to flooding.

On 21 August, days of heavy rainfall triggered a landslide, causing seven people deaths and two missing.

=== Yunnan ===
From the evening of 29 to 30 June, a heavy rainstorm occurred in Zhenxiong County, Yiliang County, Weixin County and Yanjin County. The level of Baishui River, a tributary of the Yangtze River, had risen 8 metres (26 ft), causing serious floods in towns and townships along the river. As of 21:00 on 30 June, 3,871.54 hectares (38.7154 km^{2}) of crops such as corn, potatoes and tobacco were affected, 3,745.09 hectares (37.4509 km^{2}) were damaged and 84.68 hectares (0.8468 km^{2}) will have no harvest, and more than 90 houses collapsed, 59 houses badly damaged and 90 houses partially damaged.

=== Zhejiang ===
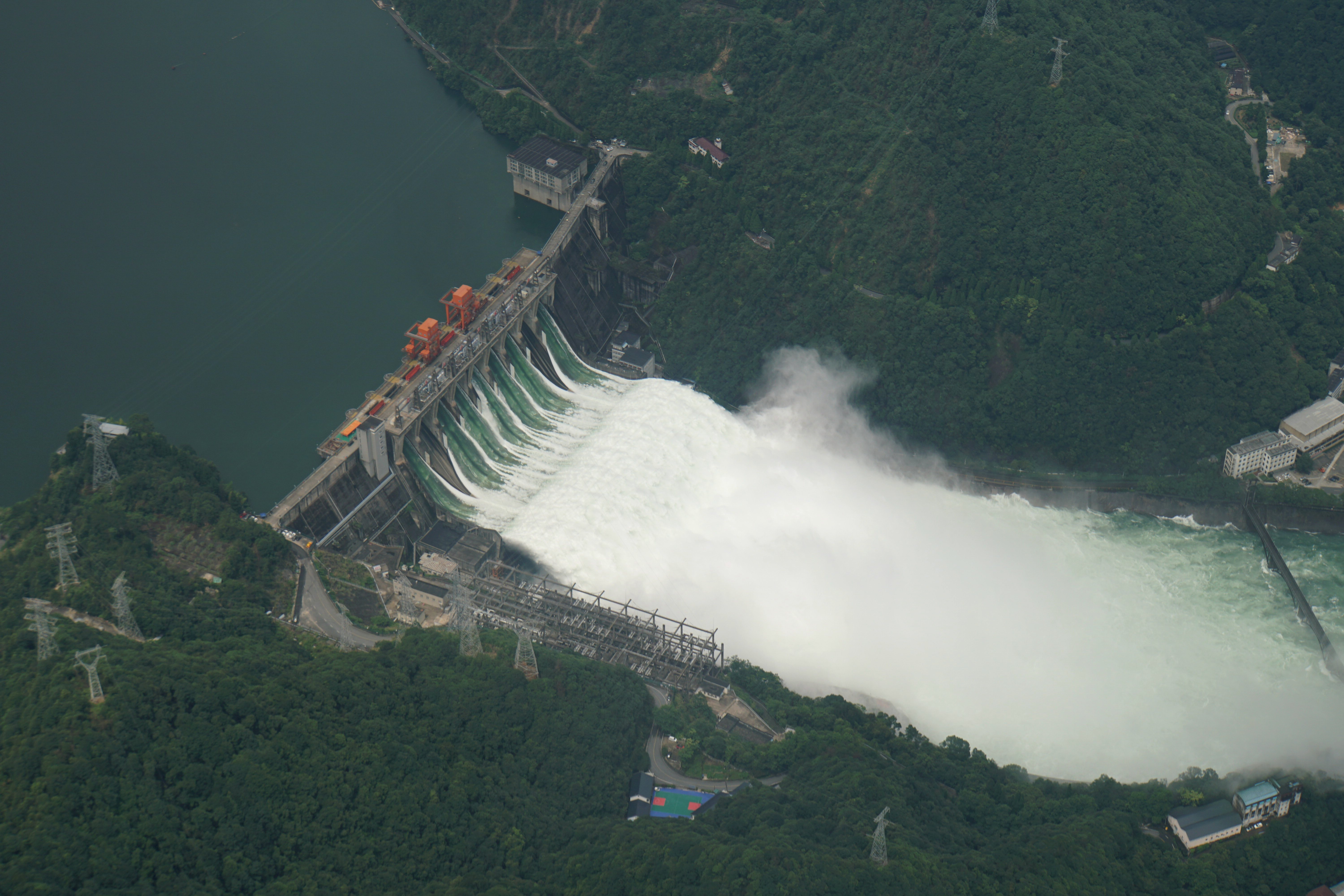
Flood discharging at Xin'an River Dam

On 29 May, Chunan County suffered the strongest plum rain in history. On 8 July, the level of Qiandao Lake reached its highest level in history. At 9:00 a.m. on 8 July, Xin'an River Hydropower Station began to discharge flood. This is the first time since the completion of the hydropower station that all 9 gates have been fully opened for flood discharge.

== Government actions ==
The Chinese government allocated about 309 million yuan (44.2 million U.S. dollars) for disaster relief in flood-hit regions. On 8 and 12 July, Chinese Communist Party (CCP) general secretary and paramount leader Xi Jinping as well as Premier Li Keqiang called successively for all-out efforts in rescue and relief operations in flooded areas across China and stressed that ensuring people's lives and safety is a top priority.

On the evening of 12 July, more than 7,000 officers and soldiers of the 71st Group Army and the 72nd Group Army went to Jiujiang and Tongling to participate in flood fighting and emergency rescue tasks. On the morning of 14 July, more than 3,700 officers and soldiers from the 73rd Group Army rushed to Yugan County to fight against floods and deal with emergencies. On 14 July, according to the order of the Central Military Commission, more than 16,000 officers and soldiers were sent to Jiujiang, Shangrao and other areas of Jiangxi to fight floods. At 23:00 on 19 July, the officials of the Central Theater Command arrived in Wuhan, Hubei to command flood fighting and disaster relief. On 22 July, the Chinese government channeled 830 million yuan (119.05 million U.S. dollars) from its central budget to restore water conservancy and agricultural production facilities in 12 provincial flood-hit regions. On 19 August, CCP general secretary Xi Jinping visited Wangjiaba Dam on the Huai River and other flood-hit areas in Fuyang. That same day, Premier Li Keqiang arrived in Chongqing to assess conditions, visiting the village of Shuangba and the historic town of Ciqikou.

== See also ==
- 2021 China floods
- 2020 Kyushu floods
- 2020 Nepal floods
- 2020 Assam floods
- 2020 Korean floods
- 2020 Central Vietnam floods
