= Laozhou Township =

Laozhou Township 老洲乡
- Township
- Interactive map of Laozhou Township
- Coordinates: 30°58′18″N 117°44′58″E
- Country: People's Republic of China
- Province: Anhui
- Prefecture-level city: Tongling
- District: Yi'an

Area
  - Total: 42 km^{2} (16 sq mi)

Population (2017)
  - Total: 8,146
  - Density: 190/km^{2} (500/sq mi)
- Time zone: UTC+08:00 (China Standard)
- Postal code: 244106
- Area code: 0562

Chinese name
- Traditional Chinese: 老洲鄉
- Simplified Chinese: 老洲乡
Transcriptions
Standard Mandarin
- Hanyu Pinyin: Lǎozhōu Xiāng

Laozhou Township (Chinese: 老洲乡) is a township in Yi'an District of Tongling, Anhui, China. As of the 2017 census it had a population of 8,146 and an area of 42-square-kilometre (16 sq mi). The township is bordered to the east by Wusong Town and to the west by Wuwei County and Zongyang County.

== History ==
Due to floods, all residents in the township and Xuba Township of Tongling along the Yangtze River were ordered to evacuate on July 11, 2020.

== Administrative division ==
As of 2017, the township is divided into five villages:

- Zhongxin (中心村)
- Guanghui (光辉村)
- Heping (和平村)
- Minzhu (民主村)
- Chengde (成德村)

== Economy ==
The township is rich in rape and vegetables.
