= Chang Lake =

Chang Lake, may refer to:

- Chang Lake (Hubei), a lake in Hubei, China.
- Chang Lake (Yunnan), a lake in Yunnan, China.
