= Yao Fuqiang =

Chinese scientist

- Born: May 1957 (age 69); Zongyang County, Anhui, China
- Education: Xidian University
- Scientific career
- Fields: Communications system
- Workplaces: National University of Defense Technology

Chinese name
- Traditional Chinese: 姚富強
- Simplified Chinese: 姚富强
Transcriptions
Standard Mandarin
- Hanyu Pinyin: Yáo Fùqiáng

Yao Fuqiang (Chinese: 姚富强; born May 1957) is a Chinese scientist specializing in communications system. He is an academician of the Chinese Academy of Engineering (CAE) and holds the rank of major general (shaojiang) in the People's Liberation Army. He is a member of the Chinese Institute of Electronics (CIE) and China Institute of Communications (CIC).

== Biography ==
Yao was born in Zongyang County, Anhui, in May 1957. He secondary studied at Tietong Agricultural High School. He earned a bachelor's degree in 1982, a master's degree in 1990, and a doctor's degree in 1993, all from Xidian University. He is now a researcher, doctoral supervisor, and director of the No.63 Research Institute of National University of Defense Technology. He is a part-time professor at Tsinghua University, Beijing Institute of Technology, and Harbin Institute of Technology.

== Honours and awards ==
- November 22, 2019 Member of the Chinese Academy of Engineering (CAE)
