= Tietong Township =

Tietong Township 铁铜乡
- Township
- Interactive map of Tietong Township
- Coordinates: 30°40′09″N 117°13′13″E
- Country: People's Republic of China
- Province: Anhui
- Prefecture-level city: Tongling
- County: Zongyang County

Area
  - Total: 12.3 km^{2} (4.7 sq mi)

Population (2020)
  - Total: 2,448
  - Density: 199/km^{2} (515/sq mi)
- Time zone: UTC+08:00 (China Standard)
- Postal code: 246700
- Area code: 0562

Chinese name
- Simplified Chinese: 铁铜乡
- Traditional Chinese: 鐵銅鄉
- Literal meaning: Township of Iron and Copper
Transcriptions
Standard Mandarin
- Hanyu Pinyin: Tiětóng Xiāng

Tietong Township (Chinese: 铁铜乡; lit. 'Township of Iron and Copper') is a township in Zongyang County, Anhui, China. As of the 2020 census it had a population of 2,448 and an area of 12.3-square-kilometre (4.7 sq mi). It is an island between the Yangtze River and Jia River.

== History ==
On July 16, 2020, all the remaining 2,272 people were evacuated except 176 left behind due to the flood inundated the island.

== Administrative division ==
As of 2017, the township is divided into four villages:

- Qingfeng (庆丰村)
- Xinfeng (新丰村)
- Jiangtou (江头村)
- Zhongnan (中南村)

== Economy ==
The local economy is primarily based upon agriculture. The main vegetables are lotus bean, green bean, carrot, mustard, and cabbage.

== Transport ==
Ferry is the main mode of transportation.
