= Xuba Township =

Xuba Township 胥坝乡
- Township
- Interactive map of Xuba Township
- Coordinates: 31°05′21″N 117°50′24″E
- Country: People's Republic of China
- Province: Anhui
- Prefecture-level city: Tongling
- District: Yi'an

Area
  - Total: 86 km^{2} (33 sq mi)

Population (2017)
  - Total: 20,986
  - Density: 240/km^{2} (630/sq mi)
- Time zone: UTC+08:00 (China Standard)
- Postal code: 244103
- Area code: 0562

Chinese name
- Traditional Chinese: 胥壩鄉
- Simplified Chinese: 胥坝乡
Transcriptions
Standard Mandarin
- Hanyu Pinyin: Xūbà Xiāng

Xuba Township (Chinese: 胥坝乡) is a township in Yi'an District of Tongling, Anhui, China. As of the 2017 census it had a population of 20,986 and an area of 86-square-kilometre (33 sq mi).

== Administrative division ==
As of 2017, the township is divided into one community and sixteen villages:

- Funing Community (抚宁社区)
- Xuguang (旭光村)
- Xinzhou (新洲村)
- Wenxing (文兴村)
- Qunxin (群心村)
- Honglou (洪楼村)
- Longtan (龙潭村)
- Yiguan (衣冠村)
- Chongxin (重新村)
- Anping (安平村)
- Zilong (子垅村)
- Xijiang (西江村)
- Zhongzhou (中洲村)
- Hongmiao (红庙村)
- Qianjiang (前江村)
- Jiangbin (江滨村)
- Changyang (长杨村)

== History ==
It was incorporated as a township in 1957. It was renamed as "Xuba Commune" (胥坝公社) in 1961 and was renamed "Xuba Township" in 1983.

Due to floods, all residents in the township and Laozhou Township of Tongling along the Yangtze River were ordered to evacuate on July 11, 2020.

== Economy ==
The township is rich in rape and vegetables.

== Education ==
There are two middle schools in the township: Anping Ciji Middle School (安平慈济中学) and Xuba Middle School (胥坝中学).
