= Zhang Gengsheng =

Chinese economist

- 章更生

Vice Governor of the China Construction Bank
- In office April 2013 – December 2020
- Governor: Zhang Jianguo; Wang Zuji; Liu Guiping

Personal details
- Born: May 1960 (age 66) Dongzhi County, Anhui, China
- Party: Chinese Communist Party (expelled in 2025)
- Education: Dongbei University of Finance and Economics; Peking University

Zhang Gengsheng (Chinese: 章更生; pinyin: Zhāng Gēngshēng; born May 1960) is a Chinese executive and economist who served as vice governor of the China Construction Bank from 2013 to 2020. As of November 2024 he was under investigation by the Central Commission for Discipline Inspection.

== Early life and education ==
Zhang was born in Dongzhi County, Anhui, in May 1960. In 1984 he graduated from Liaoning College of Finance and Economics (now Dongbei University of Finance and Economics). In 2010, he obtained a master's degree in business administration for senior management from Peking University.

== Career ==
In December 1996, Zhang became vice governor of Three Gorges Branch of the China Construction Bank, rising to governor in September 1998. He served as deputy general manager of the Business Department of China Construction Bank in June 2000, and three years later promoted to the general manager position. He also served as general manager of Group Customer Department from March 2004 to December 2010 and vice governor of the Beijing Branch from October 2006 to December 2010. He rose to become vice governor of the China Construction Bank in April 2013, in addition to serving as chairman of CCB Life Insurance Co., Ltd.

In July 2021, Zhang became an outside director of the State Grid Corporation of China.

== Downfall ==
On 8 November 2024, Zhang was suspected of "serious violations of laws and regulations" by the Central Commission for Discipline Inspection (CCDI), the party's internal disciplinary body, and the National Supervisory Commission, the highest anti-corruption agency of China.

On 23 April 2025, Zhang was expelled from the CCP. On May 20, he was arrested by the Supreme People's Procuratorate. On September 8, was indicted on suspicion of accepting bribes and issuing loans improperly.
