= Zhenhai Bridge =

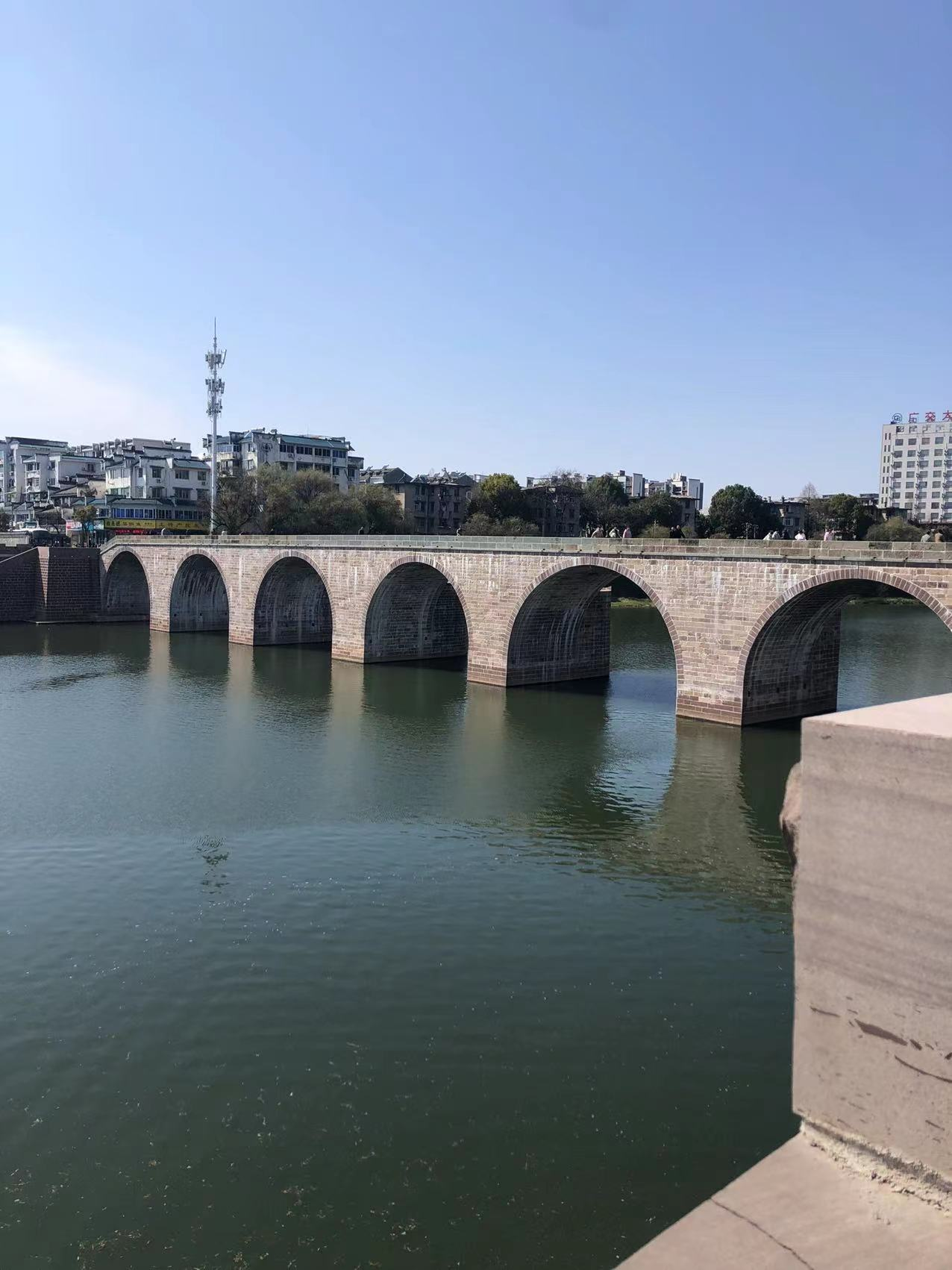
- Zhenhai Bridge after restoration
- Coordinates: 29°42′41″N 118°17′49″E
- Crossed: Heng River
- Locale: Tunxi District of Huangshan City, Anhui, China

Characteristics
- Design: Arch bridge Stone bridge
- Total length: 133 m (436 ft)
- Width: 15 m (49 ft)
- No. of spans: 7

History
- Construction end: 1699 (reconstruction)
- Rebuilt: 2021
- Collapsed: July 7, 2020

Chinese name
- Traditional Chinese: 鎮海橋
- Simplified Chinese: 镇海桥
Transcriptions
Standard Mandarin
- Hanyu Pinyin: Zhènhǎi Qiáo

Zhenhai Bridge (Chinese: 镇海桥; pinyin: Zhènhǎi Qiáo) is a stone arch bridge in Tunxi District of Huangshan City, Anhui, China. The bridge spanned the Heng River for more than 400 years until being destroyed by floods in 2020. It was rebuilt in 2021. The bridge is 133 m (436 ft) long and 15 m (49 ft) wide.

== History ==
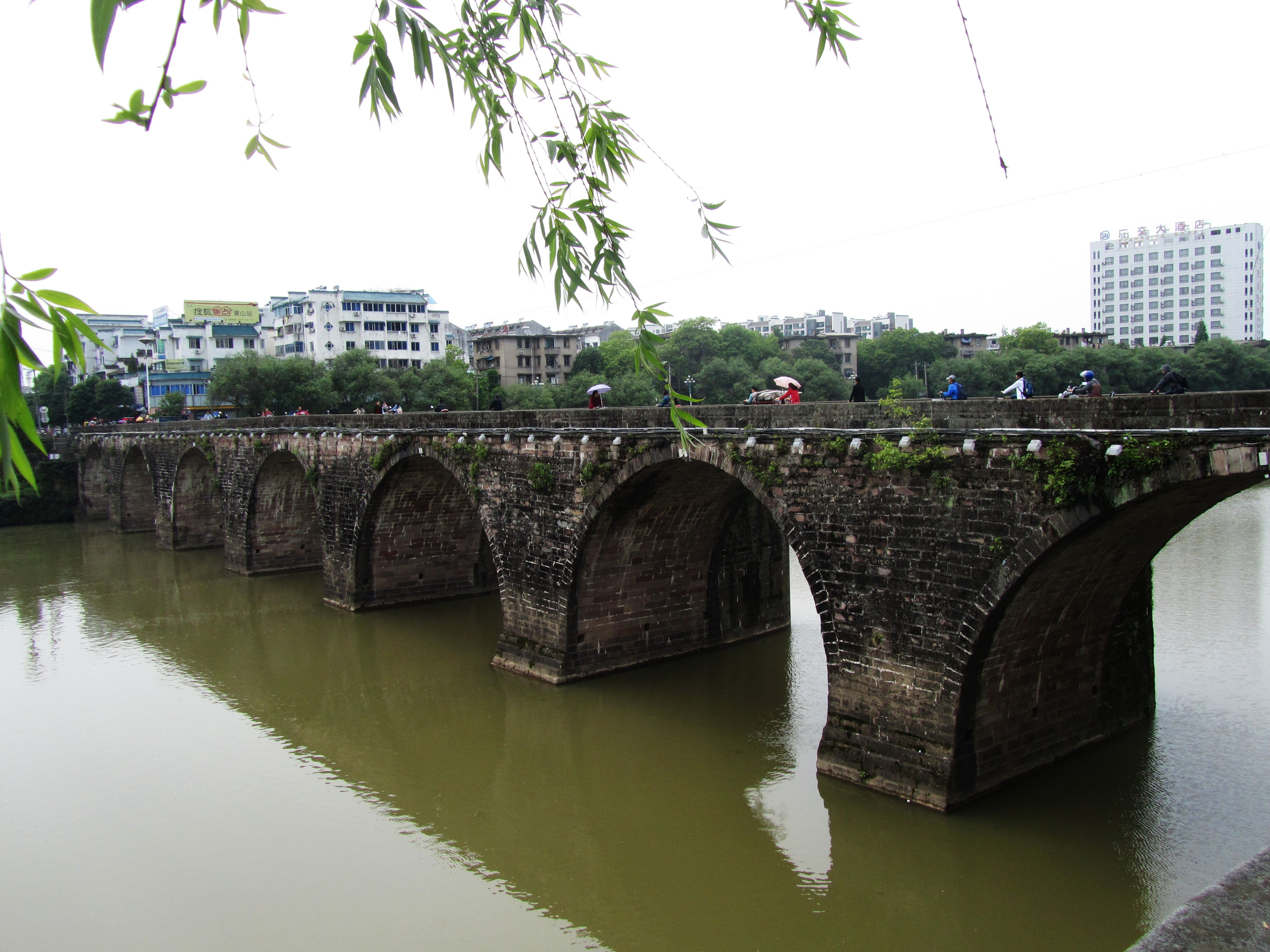
The bridge in 2013

It is said that Zhenhai Bridge was built in the 15th year of Jiajing period (1536) in the Ming dynasty, but according to Xiuning County Annals and Huizhou Prefecture Chronicles, it was built before 1490. The bridge was rebuilt in 1699, during the Kangxi reign of Qing dynasty.

In October 2019, it was designated as a "Major Historical and Cultural Site Protected at the National Level in Anhui" by the State Council.

On July 7, 2020, Zhenhai Bridge was destroyed in the 2020 China floods. During salvage works, stones of the original Ming dynasty bridge were found. In December 2020, reconstruction of the bridge began, which was completed one year later.

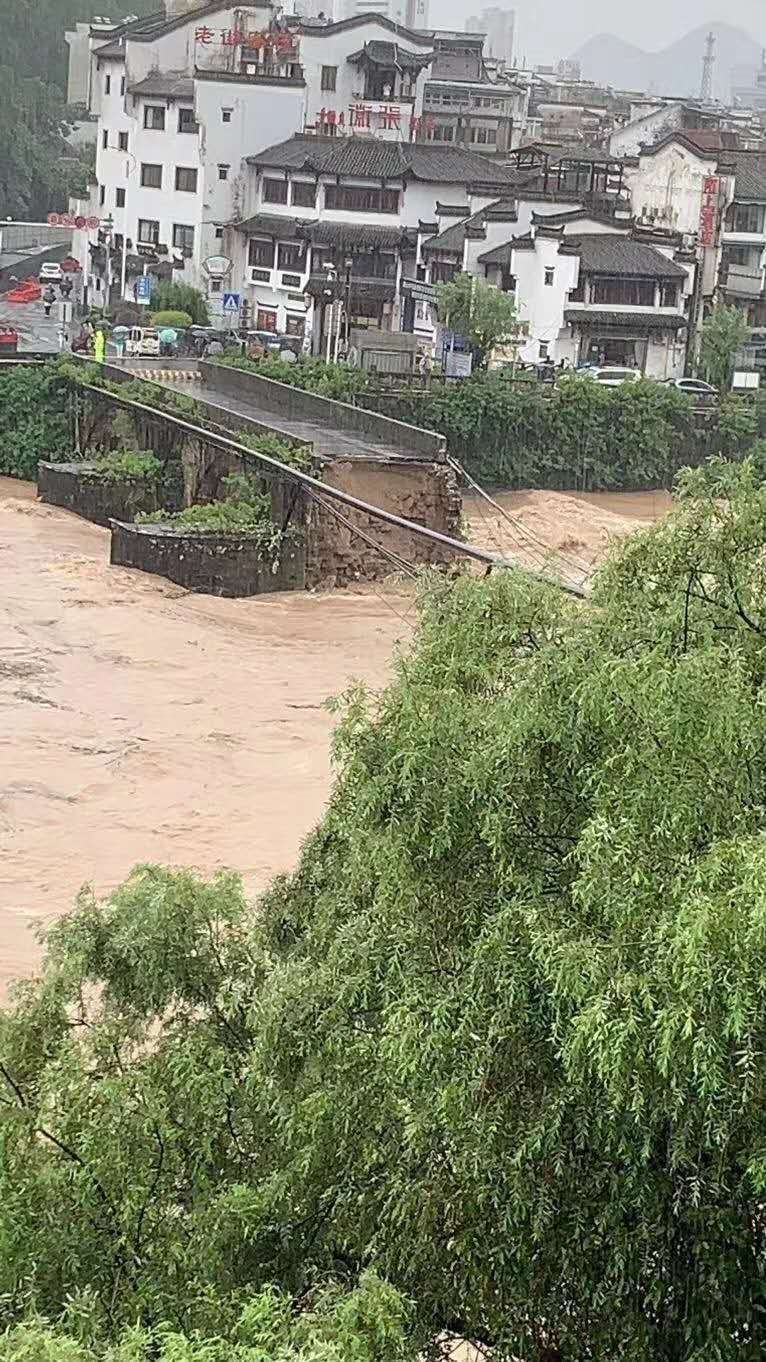
After 2020 floods
