= Gao Jiancheng =

Gao Jiancheng (高建成) (October 1965 – 1998), was a political instructor of the Chinese Air Force known for fighting the 1998 Yangtze flood. Following his death in the flooding he became a Chinese propaganda icon.

== Personal life ==
Gao Jiancheng was born in a peasant family in Xiangyin County in Hunan Province. After graduating from Xiangyin No.4 high school, he entered the Air Force Academy in 1984. After graduation, he served in Wuhan. He successively held posts of platoon lead, assistant engineer, deputy political instructor and political instructor.

Gao's mother is Yang Youxiu(杨友秀). He married Lu Bei (鲁蓓), with whom he had a daughter, Gao Jieyuan(高洁缘). After his death, his mother sent his brother Gao Jianmin to inherit Gao's career.

== Death ==
During the summer of 1998, the Yangtze River Basin flooded. On July 27, Gao's unit was ordered to carry out disaster relief efforts. In spite of running fever for several days, he led his men in the first line of rescue work.

According to Chinese state media, on August 1, Gao led his men in jeeps to a breached dike in Jiayu County upstream from Wuhan. Gao was reported to have told his men "Everyone should keep calm... The company commander and I are here. There are party members and cadres here too. Even if we are sacrificed we shall ensure your safety." The unit was overwhelmed by the floodwaters and the men clung to tree branches. Gao gave his own lifejacket to Zhao Wenyuan who could not swim. After 21:00, the situation worsened. He pushed Liu Nan, a struggling soldier to a big tree. Gao was then swept away.

On 12 August 1998, Jiang Zemin, as chairman of the Central Military Commission, conferred on him the honorary title of "flood-fighting hero". He also received the Heroic Exemplar, First Class medal.

The Guardian reported that Gao had "become a posthumous propaganda icon". The South China Morning Post reported that "A new national hero has been created as part of the Chinese Communist Party's efforts to transform the most devastating natural disasters of the decade into a patriotic campaign to unite the nation."

== See also ==
- Dong Cunrui
- Wang Jinxi
- Lei Feng
