= Le'an River =

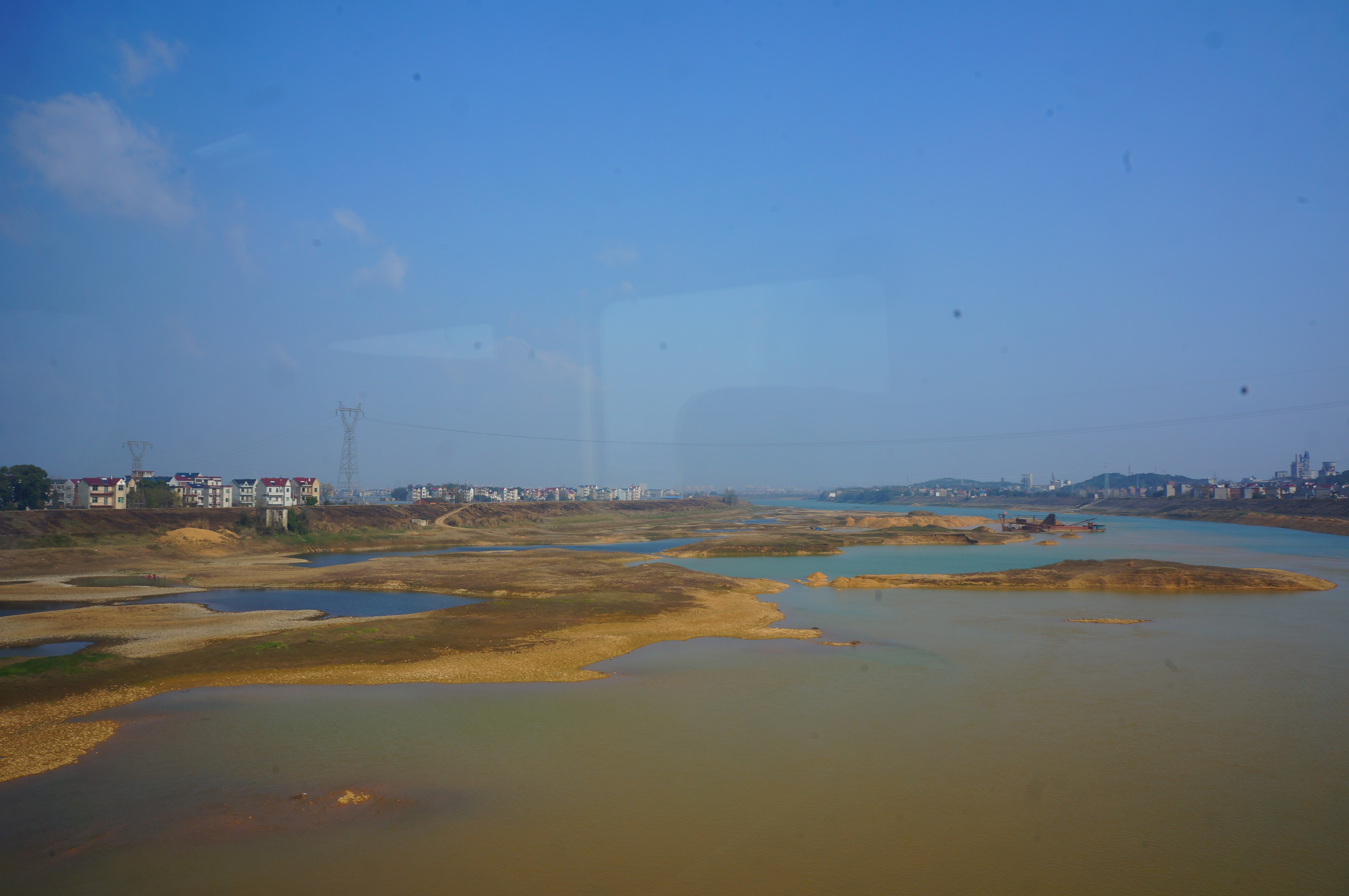
- Le'an River in December 2016.

Physical characteristics
- Source: Mount Wulong (五龙山)
  - location: Wuyuan County, Jiangxi
- Mouth: Yaogong Ferry (姚公渡)
  - location: Poyang County
- Length: 279 km (173 mi)
- Basin size: 8,456 km^{2} (3,265 sq mi)

Chinese name
- Traditional Chinese: 樂安江
- Simplified Chinese: 乐安江
Transcriptions
Standard Mandarin
- Hanyu Pinyin: Lè'ān Jiāng

Daxishui
- Chinese: 大溪水
- Literal meaning: Great Stream
Transcriptions
Standard Mandarin
- Hanyu Pinyin: Dàxīshuǐ

Le'an River (Chinese: 乐安江; pinyin: Lè'ān Jiāng), also known as Daxishui (大溪水; Dàxīshuǐ), is a tributary of the Po River in Wuyuan County, Jiangxi, China. It is 279 kilometres (173 mi) long and drains an area of 8,456 square kilometres (3,265 sq mi). The river rises in Mount Wulong (五龙山) just northeastern Wuyuan County, and flows generally north through Dexing, Leping, and Wannian County to Yaogong Ferry (姚公渡) in Poyang County, where it flows into the Rao River. Its main tributaries are Fanxi Stream (番溪水), Anyin Stream (安殷河), Chaxi Stream (槎溪河) and Jianjie Stream (建节水). Le'an River is one of the five longest rivers in Jiangxi.
