= Nanxiguzhai =

Village in Anhui, China

Nanxiguzhai, or 南溪古寨, also known as 金家村 (Jin clan's village), is located within Dongzhi County of Anhui province in China. This village, which is nestled deep in the midst of hills, is known to be home to approximately 800 families who are descendants of Xiongnu chieftain 休屠王.
