= Rao River =

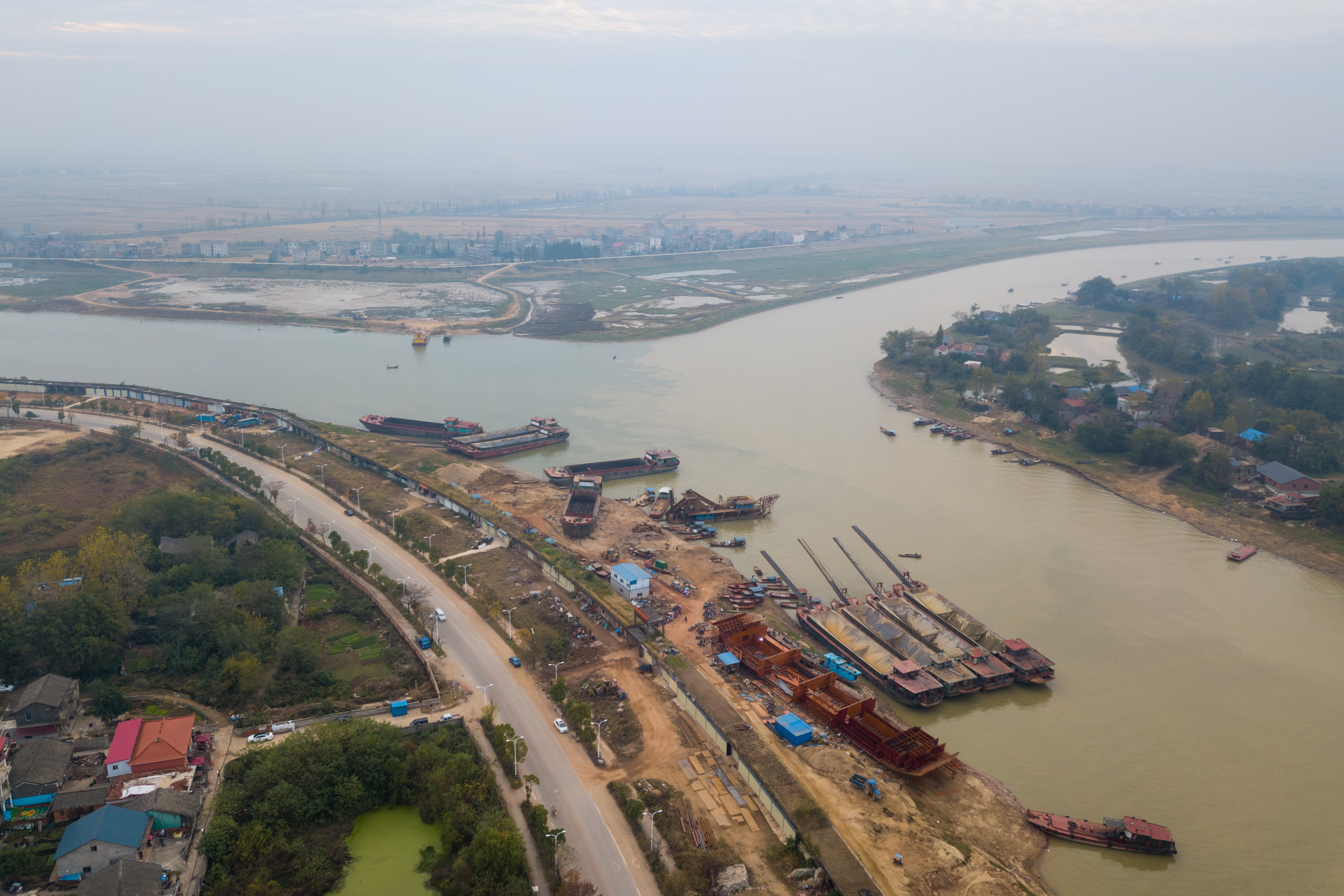
- Rao River in November 2017.

Physical characteristics
- Source: Mount Wulong (五龙山)
  - location: Wuyuan County, Jiangxi
- 2nd source: Dahong Ridge (大洪岭)
  - location: Qimen County, Jiangxi
- Mouth: Poyang Lake
  - location: Poyang County
- Length: 40 km (25 mi)
- Basin size: 15,000 km^{2} (5,800 mi^{2})

Basin features
- Waterbodies: Poyang Lake

Chinese name
- Traditional Chinese: 饒河
- Simplified Chinese: 饶河
Transcriptions
Standard Mandarin
- Hanyu Pinyin: Ráo Hé

Po River
- Chinese: 鄱江
Transcriptions
Standard Mandarin
- Hanyu Pinyin: Pó Jiāng

Du River
- Chinese: 都江
Transcriptions
Standard Mandarin
- Hanyu Pinyin: Dū Jiāng

Changgang River
- Traditional Chinese: 長港
- Simplified Chinese: 长港
Transcriptions
Standard Mandarin
- Hanyu Pinyin: Chánggǎng

Fan River
- Chinese: 番水
Transcriptions
Standard Mandarin
- Hanyu Pinyin: Fān Shuǐ

Rao River (simplified Chinese: 饶河; traditional Chinese: 饒河; pinyin: Ráo Hé), also known as Po River (鄱江; Pó Jiāng), Du River (都江; Dū Jiāng), Changgang River (长港; Chánggǎng) and Fan River (番水; Fān Shuǐ), is a river in northeastern Jiangxi, China. It is 40 kilometres (25 mi) long and drains an area of 15,000 km^{2} (5,800 mi^{2}). Rao River has two tributaries, the Chang River in the north and the Le'an River in the south. The two tributaries meet in Yaogong Ferry (姚公渡) in southeastern Poyang County to join Rao River.

== History ==
On July 11, 2020, Rao River rose to an all-time high of 22.65-metre (74.3 ft), crossing the danger mark and surpassing the previous record of 22.43-metre (73.6 ft) set in 1998.
