= Qilin, Anhui =

Town in Zongyang, Anhui, China

Coordinates: 30.9987°N 117.1346°E

Qilin (Chinese: 麒麟) is a town situated in the west of Zongyang, Anhui Province, a landlocked province in eastern China.
