= Zongyang dialect =

Dialect of Lower Yangtze Mandarin

The Zongyang dialect (Simplified Chinese:枞阳话; Traditional Chinese: 樅陽話; Pinyin: Zōngyánghuà) is a dialect of Lower Yangtze Mandarin spoken in Zongyang County of Anhui Province, China.

== See also ==
- Language Atlas of China
