= Zhegao =

Zhegao 柘皋镇
- Town
- Interactive map of Zhegao
- Coordinates: 31.782746°N 117.755346°E
- Country: People's Republic of China
- Province: Anhui
- Prefecture-level city: Hefei
- County-level city: Chaohu

Area
  - Total: 148 km^{2} (57 sq mi)

Population (2017)
  - Total: 34,000
  - Density: 230/km^{2} (590/sq mi)
- Time zone: UTC+08:00 (China Standard)
- Postal code: 238062
- Area code: 0565

Chinese name
- Simplified Chinese: 柘皋镇
- Traditional Chinese: 柘皋鎮
Transcriptions
Standard Mandarin
- Hanyu Pinyin: Zhègāo Zhèn

Zhegao (Chinese: 柘皋镇; pinyin: Zhègāo Zhèn) is a town in Chaohu, Anhui, China. As of the 2017 census it had a population of 34,000 and an area of 148-square-kilometre (57 sq mi).

== History ==
In the Warring States (475 BC–221 BC) period, it was under the jurisdiction of Chu State (1115 BC–223 BC) and then Wu State (12th century BC–473 BC).

In the Han dynasty (202 BC–220 AD), it was under the jurisdiction of Tuogao County (橐皋县) of Jiujiang Prefecture (九江郡).

In the Tang dynasty (618–907), it was known as "Tuogao Town" (橐皋镇) and came under the jurisdiction of Chao County (巢县).

In the South Song dynasty (1127–1279), the Song and Jin armies fought in the town, known as the Zhegao War (柘皋之战) in the history of China.

In 1957, it was incorporated as a town. In 1958 it became a People's Commune. In 1983, it was changed to a township. In 1992, it was upgraded to a town. On 23 July, 2020, affected by the continuous heavy rainfall, the water level of the Zhegao River rose and streets of the town were submerged.

== Administrative division ==
As of 2017, the town is divided into two communities and sixteen villages:

- West Street Community (西街社区)
- East Street Community (东街社区)
- Xingba (兴坝村)
- Sanxing (三星村)
- Jianhe (建和村)
- Sima (驷马村)
- Gongmin (工民村)
- Dashuliu (大树刘村)
- Jieyin'an (接引庵村)
- Jinqi (锦旗村)
- Xinghuo (星火村)
- Hepu (合浦村)
- Ershan (而山村)
- Banqiao (板桥村)
- Datang (大塘村)
- Wangqiao (汪桥村)
- Wuxing (五星村)
- Shuangquan (双泉村)

== Geography ==
The highest point in the town is Mount Fucha (浮槎山) which stands 418 metres (1,371 ft) above sea level.

Zhegao River (柘皋河) passes through the town.

== Economy ==
Rice and wheat are the main food crops in the town. Pigs, vegetables and honey are the main agricultural income.

== Transport ==
The National Highway G312 passes across the town south to north.

G5011 Wuhu-Hefei Expressway is a northwest–southeast highway in the town.

Zhegao railway station serves the town.

== Notable people ==
- Jin Chaoxing, politician in the Ming dynasty (1368–1644).
- Tang Maogang (汤懋纲), politician in the Qing dynasty (1644–1911).
- Yang Yuren (杨欲仁), politician in the Qing dynasty (1644–1911).
- Yang Lianggong, vice-president of the Examination Yuan.
- Zhou Yibing, lieutenant general of the People's Liberation Army.
- Ma Subing (马素兵), professor at the Central Party School of the Chinese Communist Party.
- Cheng Guocai (程国采), professor at the PLA National Defence University.
- Kan Jiamin (阚家蓂), Chinese-American scientist.
- Gao Zhi (高植), translator.
