= Chu River (Anhui) =

River in Anhui and Jiangsu, China

Chu River (Chinese: 滁河) is a river of Anhui and Jiangsu, China. It has a total length of 224 kilometres (139 mi), of which 178 kilometres (111 mi) flows through Anhui and 45.5 kilometres (28.3 mi) through Jiangsu. It has a basin area of about 8,000 square kilometres (3,100 sq mi).
