= Tuo River (Hunan) =

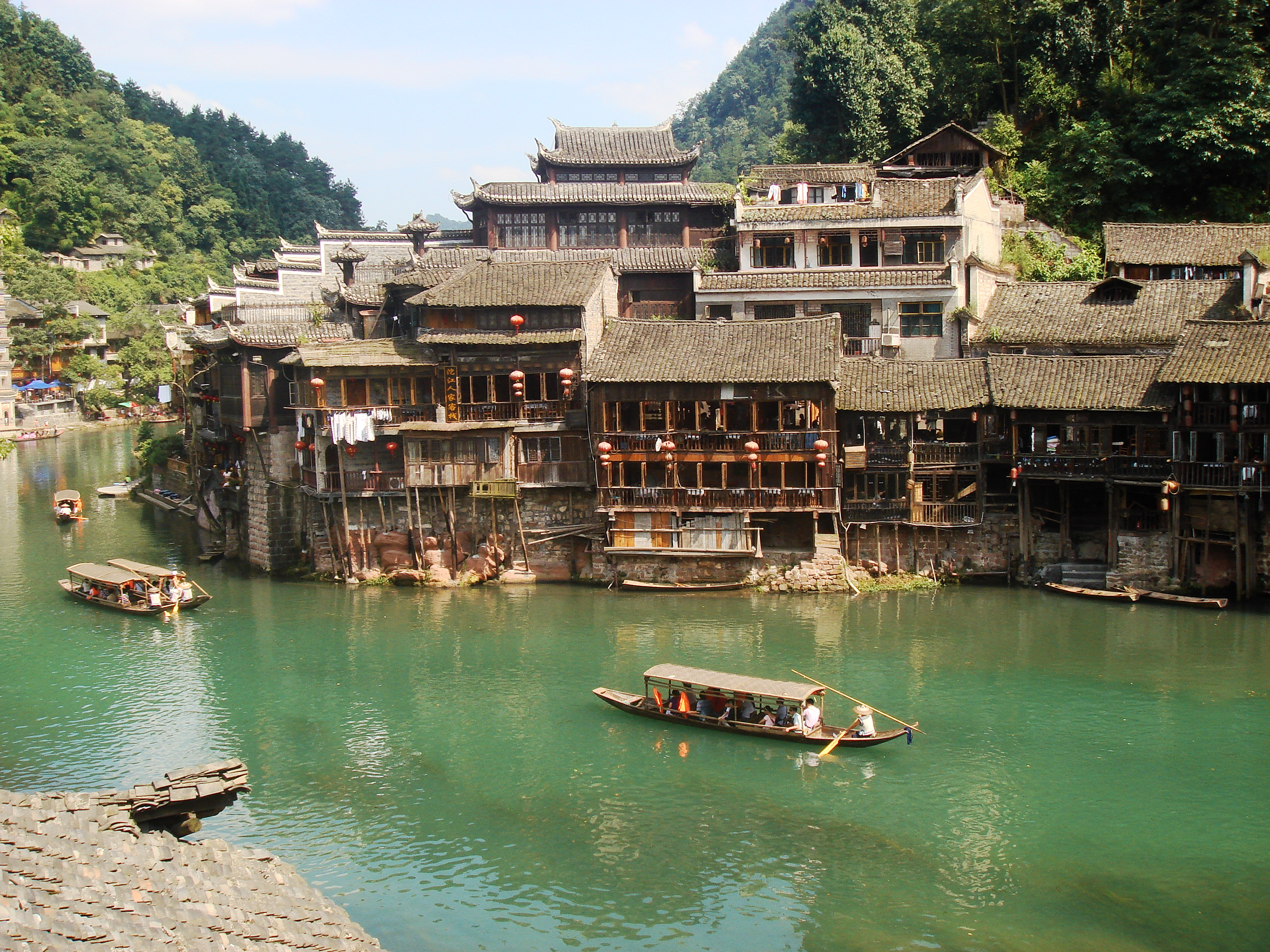
- Tuo River in Fenghuang County.

- Location in Hunan
- Native name: 沱江 (Chinese)

Physical characteristics
- Source: La'ershan Town
  - location: Fenghuang County, Hunan
- Mouth: Wu River
  - location: Jishou, Hunan
  - coordinates: 28°13′25″N 109°48′53″E
- Length: 131 km (81 mi)
- Basin size: 981 km^{2} (379 mi^{2})

Tuo River (Chinese: 沱江; pinyin: Tuó Jiāng) is a tributary of the Wu River in Fenghuang County, Hunan, China. It is 131 kilometres (81 mi) long and drains an area of 981 square kilometres (379 sq mi). It rises in La'ershan Town of western Fenghuang County, and flows generally north, passing through Luxi County and Jishou and joining the Wu River in Hexi Town.
