= Hefei Economic and Technological Development Zone =

Coordinates: 31°47′05″N 117°12′52″E

Hefei Economic and Technological Development Zone (simplified Chinese: 合肥经济技术开发区; traditional Chinese: 合肥經濟技術開發區; pinyin: Héféi Jīngjì Jìshù Kāifāqū) is an economic and technical development zone (ETZ) in Hefei, capital of east China's Anhui province. It was created on April 3, 1993. On February 13, 2000, it was approved to an ETZ at national level. It is located close to Hefei Xinqiao International Airport.
