= Chang Lake (Yunnan) =

- 长湖 (Chinese)
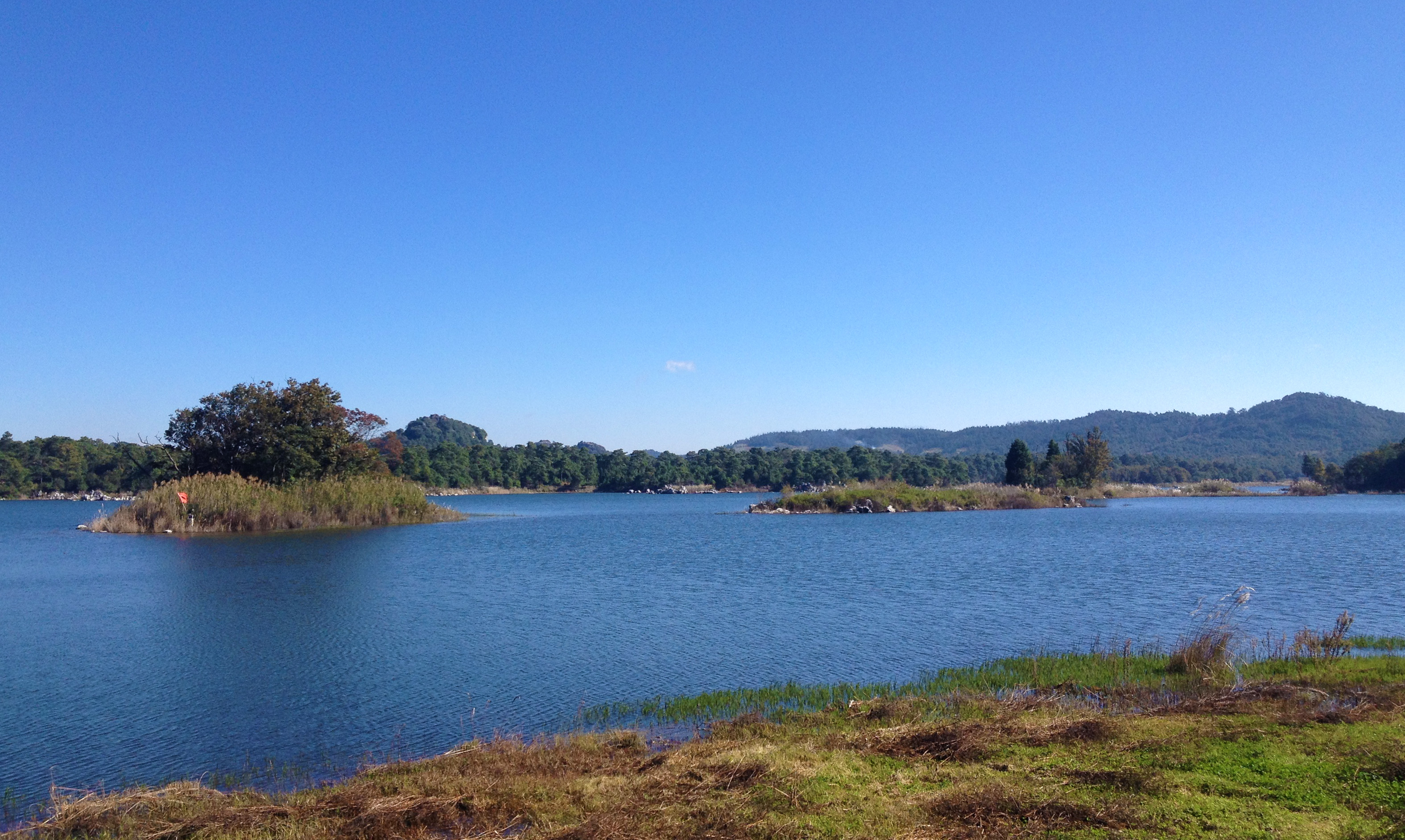
- Chang Lake in 2015.

- Location within Yunnan
- Location: Changhu Town, Shilin Yi Autonomous County, Yunnan
- Coordinates: 24°42′49″N 103°25′15″E
- Type: Lake
- Basin countries: China
- Average depth: 24 square kilometres (5,900 acres)
- Water volume: 1,810,000 m^{3} (0.00043 cu mi)
- Surface elevation: 1,907 m (6,257 ft)

Chang Lake (simplified Chinese: 长湖; traditional Chinese: 長湖; pinyin: Cháng Hú; lit. 'Long Lake'), also known as Cang Lake (藏湖; Cáng Hú; 'Hidden Lake'), is a lake located in the town of Chang Lake, Shilin Yi Autonomous County, Yunnan, China. Changhu, 1,907-metre (6,257 ft) above sea level, has a circumference of 5,000-metre (16,000 ft), a maximum depth of 24-metre (79 ft), and has a storage capacity of some 1,810,000 m^{3} (0.00043 cu mi) of water.
