= Yi'an District =

Coordinates: 30°57′28″N 117°57′45″E

Yi'an 义安区
- District
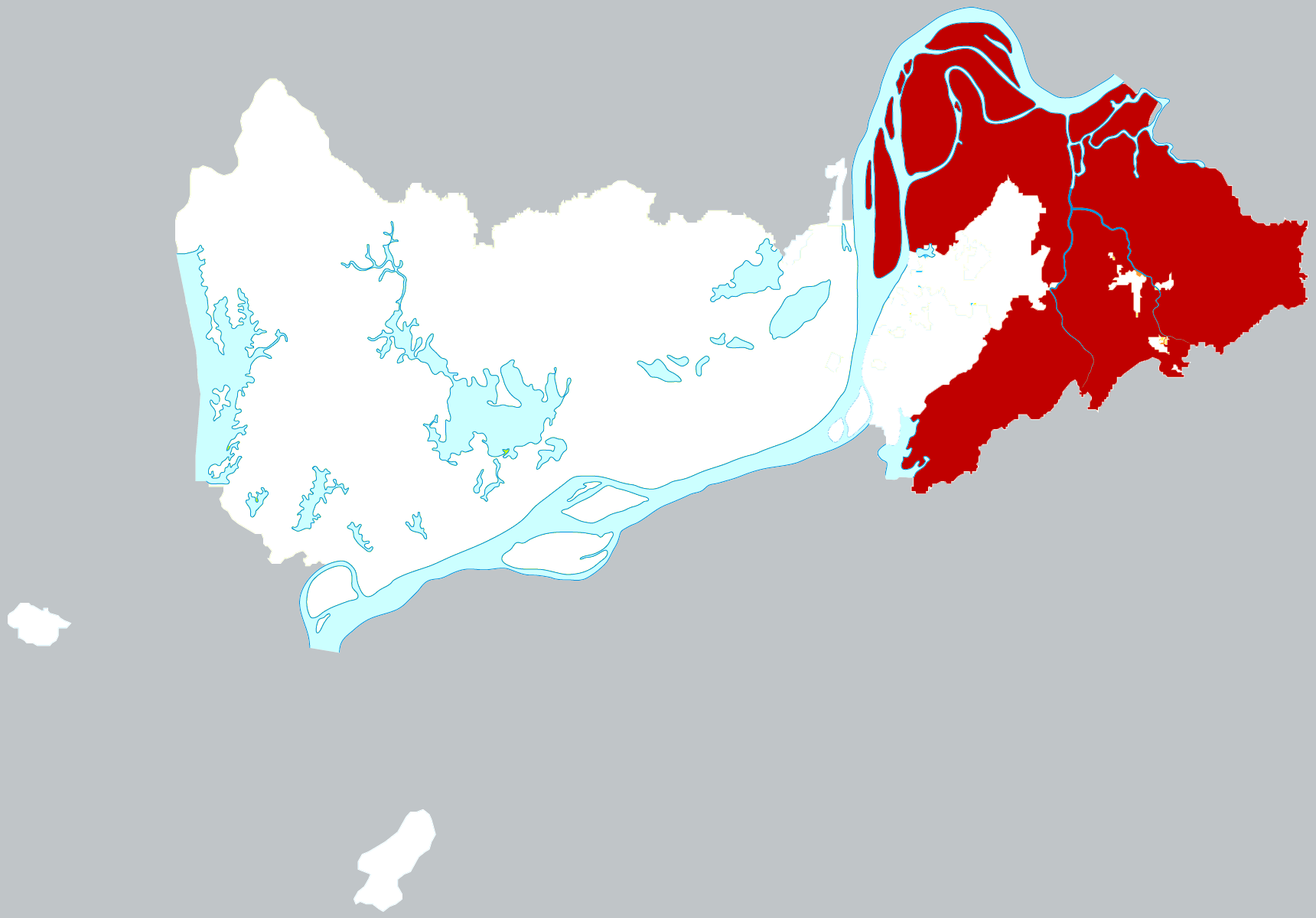
- Yi'an in Tongling
- Country: China
- Province: Anhui
- Prefecture-level city: Tongling
- District seat: Shun'an

Area
  - Total: 845 km^{2} (326 sq mi)

Population (2020)
  - Total: 227,493
  - Density: 269/km^{2} (697/sq mi)
- Time zone: UTC+8 (China Standard)
- Postal code: 244100

Yi'an District (simplified Chinese: 义安区; traditional Chinese: 義安區; pinyin: Yì'ān Qū), formerly Tongling County, is a district of the city of Tongling, in the south of Anhui province, lying on the southern and eastern (right) bank of the Yangtze River. The total area is 1,113 km^{2} (430 sq mi). The population (Han nationality) is 716,300.

Tongling is known as "a place with 8 blessings". The city has already identified thirty minerals, among which, copper reserves occupy more than 70% of Anhui Province, pyrite reserves rank first in East China and second in China, the reserves of limestone, gold and silver all stand first in Anhui.

Yi'an is a district with many rare aquatic animals, such as the white dolphin, finless porpoise and Yangtze alligator. Tongling, an origin of Chinese bronze culture, is known as "Chinese Ancient Bronze Capital".

Yi'an lies roughly midway between Shanghai and Wuhan, Nanjing and Jiujiang. It is also the northern gate of the scenery resorts, Huangshan and Jiuhua mountains.

== Geography ==
Yi'an is situated in the south of Anhui Province, on the south bank of the lower reaches of the Yangtze River. It is 80 kilometers (50 mi) west of Wuhu and neighbors Anqing, Chizhou and Chaohu with the capital of Anhui province, Hefei about 120 kilometers (75 mi) away. Yi'an lies in a region of plains and hills along the Yangtze River. The terrain is flat to the north with an alluvial plain. Low mountains lie to the south and southeast parts of the city, and a hilly region is primarily in the central region of Tongling.

== History ==
Prior to the Qin government putting it under the control of Zhang Shire, Tongling ruled was successively by several kingdoms. It is a time-honored copper-rich land in China, with a history dating back three thousand years. It is renowned as one of the birthplaces of Chinese Bronze Age culture, and its copper smelting history can be traced back to the Shang Dynasty (16th–11th century BC) and attained its prosperity during the Tang Dynasty (618-907).

== Administrative divisions ==
Yi'an District is divided to 1 subdistrict, 6 towns and 2 townships and 1 other.

1 Subdistricts

- Xinqiao Subdistrict (新桥街道)

6 Towns

- Wusong (五松镇)
- Shun'an (顺安镇)
- Zhongming (钟鸣镇)
- Tianmen (天门镇)
- Donglian (东联镇)
- Xilian (西联镇)

2 Townships

- Laozhou Township (老洲乡)
- Xuba Township (胥坝乡)

1 Other

- Yi'an Economic Development Zone (义安经济开发区)

== Climate ==
With a subtropical monsoon climate, Tongling has temperate and humid weather, wet in spring and summer, a dry autumn and moderate winter. The four seasons are quite distinct, with spring and autumn relatively short. Annual average temperature is around 16 degrees Celsius (61 degrees Fahrenheit), but it is usually extremely cold in February.

== Transport ==
From Yi'an, the Tongling–Jiujiang Railway runs west to Jiujiang and the Nanjing–Tongling Railway runs east to Nanjing. Tongling Railway Station is located in Yi'an Bei Lu of Shizishan District, primarily operating trains to Shanghai, Nanjing and Hanzhou.

Highways radiate in all directions. The Hefei-Tongling-Huangshan expressway provides access from Hefei to Tongling in two hours, with a little over an hour's drive from Tongling to Mt. Huangshan. The east–west expressway along the Yangtze River makes Yi'an connect closely with Hefei on the north and Huangshan on the south, Shanghai on the east and Wuhan on the west.

Yi'an, is also known as the north gate to the famous Mt. Jiuhua and Mt. Huangshan.

== Attractions ==
Tianjing Lake is located in downtown Tongling, on the north side of the Changjiang Xi Lu. Mounds naturally divide it into the east, west and north lake. There are in total seven hills encircling the lake and within the scenic area, new spots and historic relics complement each other perfectly. Local products include ginger in syrup, Yequeshe tea, Shun'an crunchy candy and archaized bronze vessels.

The River Dolphin Nature Reserve is a conservation center specifically for the Baiji Dolphin (Yangtze River Dolphin). Specimen halls and aquaria established in the center are for education, research and sightseeing. Apart from dolphins, giant salamanders, Japanese brocade carp, Yangtze alligators and Chinese sturgeon are on display.

Other scenic spots are Luosi Mountain and the Jinniudong Historic Mine site.
