= Dongzhi County =

Dongzhi 东至县
- County
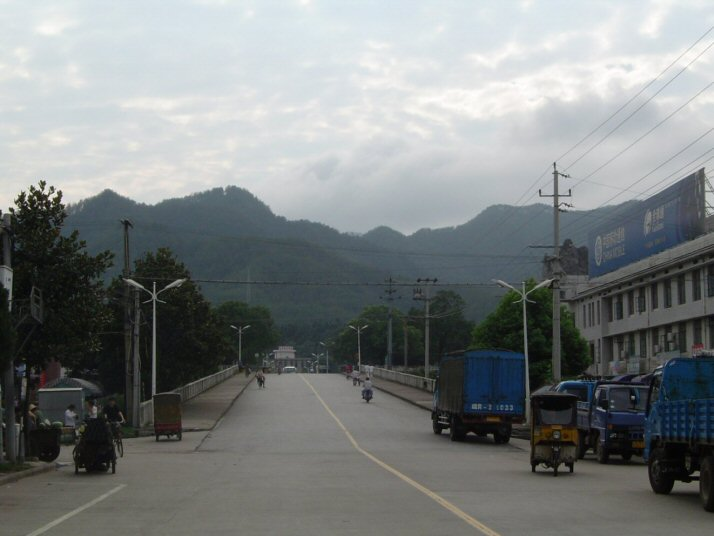

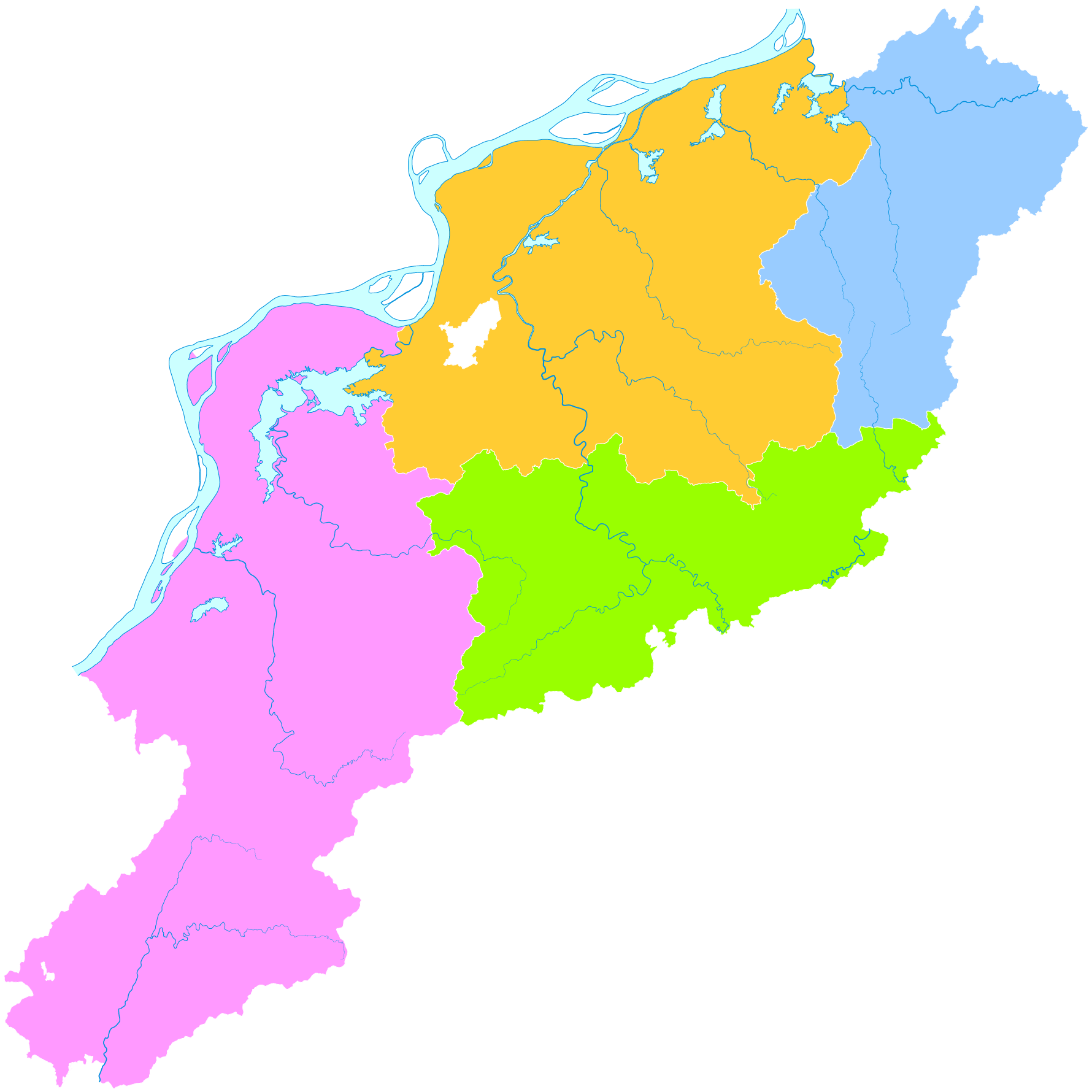
- Dongzhi is the southwesternmost division in this map of Chizhou

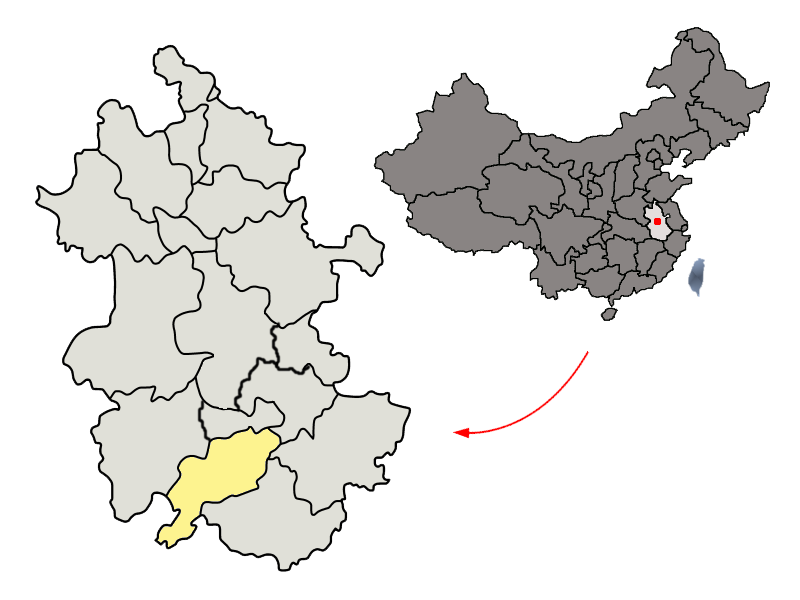
- Chizhou in Anhui
- Coordinates: 30°06′40″N 117°01′39″E
- Country: People's Republic of China
- Province: Anhui
- Prefecture-level city: Chizhou

Area
  - Total: 3,261 km^{2} (1,259 sq mi)

Population (2019)
  - Total: 492,000
  - Density: 151/km^{2} (391/sq mi)
- Time zone: UTC+8 (China Standard)
- Postal code: 247200

Dongzhi County (simplified Chinese: 东至县; traditional Chinese: 東至縣; pinyin: Dōngzhì Xiàn) is a county in the south of Anhui province, situated on the southeast (right) bank of the Yangtze and bordering Jiangxi province to the south. It is under the jurisdiction of the prefecture-level city of Chizhou and occupies its southwest corner. It has a population of 530,000 and an area of 3,256 square kilometres (1,257 mi^{2}). The government of Dongzhi County is located in Yaodu Town.

In paleontology, it is known for its Hualong Cave in which important human (called the Hualongdong people) and animal fossils have been discovered, including Homo erectus (dubbed Dongzhi Man) and a 300,000-year-old archaic human (Homo sapiens).

== Administrative divisions ==
Dongzhi County has jurisdiction over 11 towns and 3 townships.

=== Towns ===
- Yaodu (尧渡镇)
- Dongliu (东流镇)
- Longquan (龙泉镇)
- Xiangyu (香隅镇)
- Zhangxi (张溪镇)
- Yanghu (洋湖镇)
- Gegong (葛公镇)
- Dadukou (大渡口镇)
- Guangang (官港镇)
- Zhaotan (昭潭镇)
- Nixi (泥溪镇)

==== Former Towns ====
- Shengli (胜利镇)

=== Townships ===
- Muta Township (木塔乡)
- Huayuanli Township (花园里乡)
- Qingshan Township (青山乡)

== Climate ==
Climate data for Dongzhi, elevation 115 m (377 ft), (1991–2020 normals, extremes 1991–present)
| Month | Jan | Feb | Mar | Apr | May | Jun | Jul | Aug | Sep | Oct | Nov | Dec | Year |
|---|---|---|---|---|---|---|---|---|---|---|---|---|---|
| Record high °C (°F) | 26.3 (79.3) | 28.3 (82.9) | 33.7 (92.7) | 34.6 (94.3) | 36.4 (97.5) | 37.9 (100.2) | 40.2 (104.4) | 41.2 (106.2) | 37.7 (99.9) | 36.0 (96.8) | 31.5 (88.7) | 23.8 (74.8) | 41.2 (106.2) |
| Mean daily maximum °C (°F) | 8.9 (48.0) | 11.9 (53.4) | 16.5 (61.7) | 22.8 (73.0) | 27.6 (81.7) | 29.9 (85.8) | 33.4 (92.1) | 33.1 (91.6) | 29.2 (84.6) | 24.0 (75.2) | 17.9 (64.2) | 11.6 (52.9) | 22.2 (72.0) |
| Daily mean °C (°F) | 4.2 (39.6) | 6.8 (44.2) | 11.1 (52.0) | 17.1 (62.8) | 22.0 (71.6) | 25.3 (77.5) | 28.6 (83.5) | 28.0 (82.4) | 23.8 (74.8) | 17.9 (64.2) | 11.7 (53.1) | 6.0 (42.8) | 16.9 (62.4) |
| Mean daily minimum °C (°F) | 0.9 (33.6) | 3.2 (37.8) | 7.1 (44.8) | 12.7 (54.9) | 17.7 (63.9) | 21.8 (71.2) | 25.0 (77.0) | 24.4 (75.9) | 20.1 (68.2) | 13.8 (56.8) | 7.6 (45.7) | 2.2 (36.0) | 13.0 (55.5) |
| Record low °C (°F) | −10.4 (13.3) | −7.3 (18.9) | −4.2 (24.4) | −0.3 (31.5) | 8.9 (48.0) | 13.9 (57.0) | 18.3 (64.9) | 15.9 (60.6) | — | 1.3 (34.3) | −3.8 (25.2) | −13.2 (8.2) | −13.2 (8.2) |
| Average precipitation mm (inches) | 79.7 (3.14) | 94.1 (3.70) | 142.0 (5.59) | 169.1 (6.66) | 205.6 (8.09) | 288.6 (11.36) | 243.0 (9.57) | 158.0 (6.22) | 75.5 (2.97) | 57.8 (2.28) | 66.9 (2.63) | 50.1 (1.97) | 1,630.4 (64.18) |
| Average precipitation days (≥ 0.1 mm) | 12.4 | 12.7 | 15.3 | 14.2 | 14.1 | 15.3 | 12.9 | 13.1 | 8.0 | 7.9 | 9.8 | 9.7 | 145.4 |
| Average snowy days | 3.8 | 2.1 | 0.7 | 0 | 0 | 0 | 0 | 0 | 0 | 0 | 0.3 | 1.5 | 8.4 |
| Average relative humidity (%) | 79 | 78 | 78 | 77 | 78 | 82 | 79 | 80 | 80 | 79 | 80 | 77 | 79 |
| Mean monthly sunshine hours | 106.8 | 104.5 | 124.8 | 151.1 | 168.7 | 147.7 | 216.6 | 206.7 | 172.1 | 165.0 | 137.5 | 131.9 | 1,833.4 |
| Percentage possible sunshine | 33 | 33 | 33 | 39 | 40 | 35 | 51 | 51 | 47 | 47 | 43 | 42 | 41 |
Source: China Meteorological Administration

== Tourist attractions ==
The village of Nanxiguzhai, nestled deep among the hills, is well known as the dwelling place of the descendants of a tribe of the Xiongnu people, better known in the West as the Huns. A ticket priced at RMB45 can be purchased.

== Transport ==
Dongzhi is served by the Tongling–Jiujiang Railway.
