= 1998 China floods =

Natural disasters in China

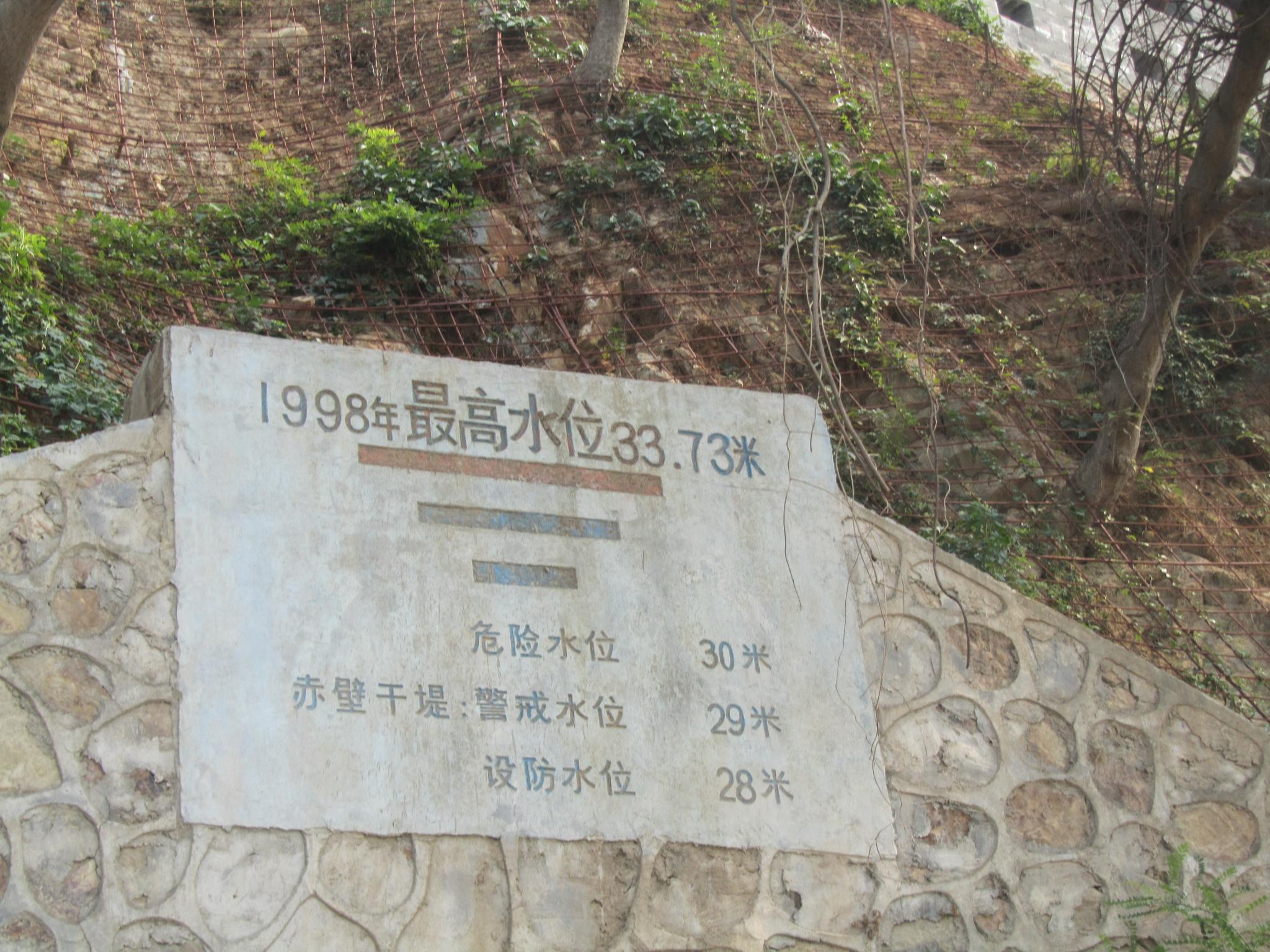
- A plaque commemorating the floods

Meteorological history
- Duration: June–September 1998

Overall effects
- Fatalities: 3,704–4,150 dead
- Areas affected: Yangtze River, Nen River, Songhua River, Pearl River

The 1998 China floods (1998年中国洪水) were floods in China that lasted from the middle of June to the beginning of September 1998 at the Yangtze River as well as the Nen River, Songhua River and the Pearl River.

== Overview ==
In the summer of 1998, China experienced severe flooding of the Yangtze River, the Nen River, the Songhua River and the Pearl River after torrential rains took place. Areas that were most threatened associated the Yangtze include the low-lying basins surrounding the Dongting and Poyang lakes, and surrounding provinces in Hubei and Hunan.

=== Tolls ===
The event was considered the worst southern China flood in 40 years. The floods resulted in 3,704 dead, 15 million homeless and $24 billion in economic loss. Other sources report a total loss of 4,150 people, and 180 million people were affected. Around 100,000 square kilometres (25,000,000 acres) were evacuated, and 13.3 million houses were damaged or destroyed.

== Yangtze River flood ==
The main cause of the flood was due to above average rainfall in the region for several months before and during the summer of 1998. Most areas saw double the normal amount of rainfall during the rainy season, with certain regions seeing rainfall levels as much as nearly three times the historical average. Combined with above average rainfall since the previous winter, this pushed water levels to above cautionary levels. The floods can be split into three general stages, beginning when one of the strongest subtropical highs in history arrived in the Yangtze River Basin during mid-June and lingered, providing sustained heavy rainfall for a period of roughly two weeks. As much as 1000 mm of precipitation was seen in some locations. After briefly shifting north, the same system eventually returned to the region in mid-July. Although the system had weakened, rainfall during this period was more intense and localized. During this second period of rain, many surrounding lakes and rivers broke record high water levels and overflowed into the Yangtze River, causing a sudden sharp rise in water levels. Another 300-500 mm of rain was seen across several areas during this second phase, causing significant damage as it flowed into villages and towns. The final period of rainfall occurred in August, with an average of 150-200 mm of rainfall seen in most regions. Although the water had begun to subside at this point, this extra rainfall caused further damage to homes and farmland in the surrounding areas. It was also during this period that the dikes began to break, causing further death and widespread damage to property.

== Impact on environmental policy ==
The 1998 flood marks a turning point in China's environmental policy. Through the 1980s and early 1990s, China had not prioritized domestic environmental matters. State policy began changing in the mid-1990s to become more protective of the environment, with the pace of change accelerating following the 1998 floods. After investigating, government scientists attributed much of the cause for flooding to upstream deforestation that had occurred during logging booms in the previous two decades. State regulation of environmental issues became more active, with the State Environmental Projection Administration aggressively campaigning against deforestation, curbing excessive water use during irrigation, and emphasizing decarbonization of China's energy supplies.

== See also ==
- 1931 China floods
- List of natural disasters by death toll
- Natural disasters in China
- Songhua River
- Tofu-dreg project
- Yangtze
- Gao Jiancheng
