= Chang Lake (Hubei) =

- Wazi Lake
- 长湖 (Chinese)
- Location within Hubei
- Location: Jingzhou/Jingmen/Qianjiang, Hubei
- Coordinates: 30°26′0″N 112°27′11″E
- Type: Lake
- Primary inflows: Juzhang River (沮漳河)
- Primary outflows: Jing River (荆河)
- Basin countries: China
- Surface area: 122.5 square kilometres (30,300 acres)
- Water volume: 271,000,000 cubic metres (72×10^{9} US gal)

The Chang Lake (simplified Chinese: 长湖; traditional Chinese: 長湖; pinyin: Cháng Hú; lit. 'Long Lake'), originally known as Wazi Lake (Chinese: 瓦子湖; pinyin: Wǎzǐ Hú), is a lake located at the junction of Jingzhou, Jingmen and Qianjiang, central China's Hubei province. It is the third largest lake in Hubei. The lake has an area of 122.5 square kilometres (30,300 acres) and a capacity of 271,000,000 cubic metres (72×10^{9} US gal). The lake discharges into Jing River.

== History ==
The name of Chang Lake dates back to the Ming dynasty (1368–1644).

From 1954 to 2005, the area of Chang Lake decreased by 71.9 square kilometres (17,800 acres).

At 13:00 p.m. on July 11, 2020, the water level of Chang Lake at Jingzhou reached 33.49-metre (109.9 ft), topping the previous record of 33.46-metre (109.8 ft) in 2016.

== Functions ==
It has many functions, such as domestic water supply, regulation and storage, flood control, fishery, tourism, irrigation, and improvement of ecological environment.
