= Zongyang County =

Zongyang 枞阳县
- County
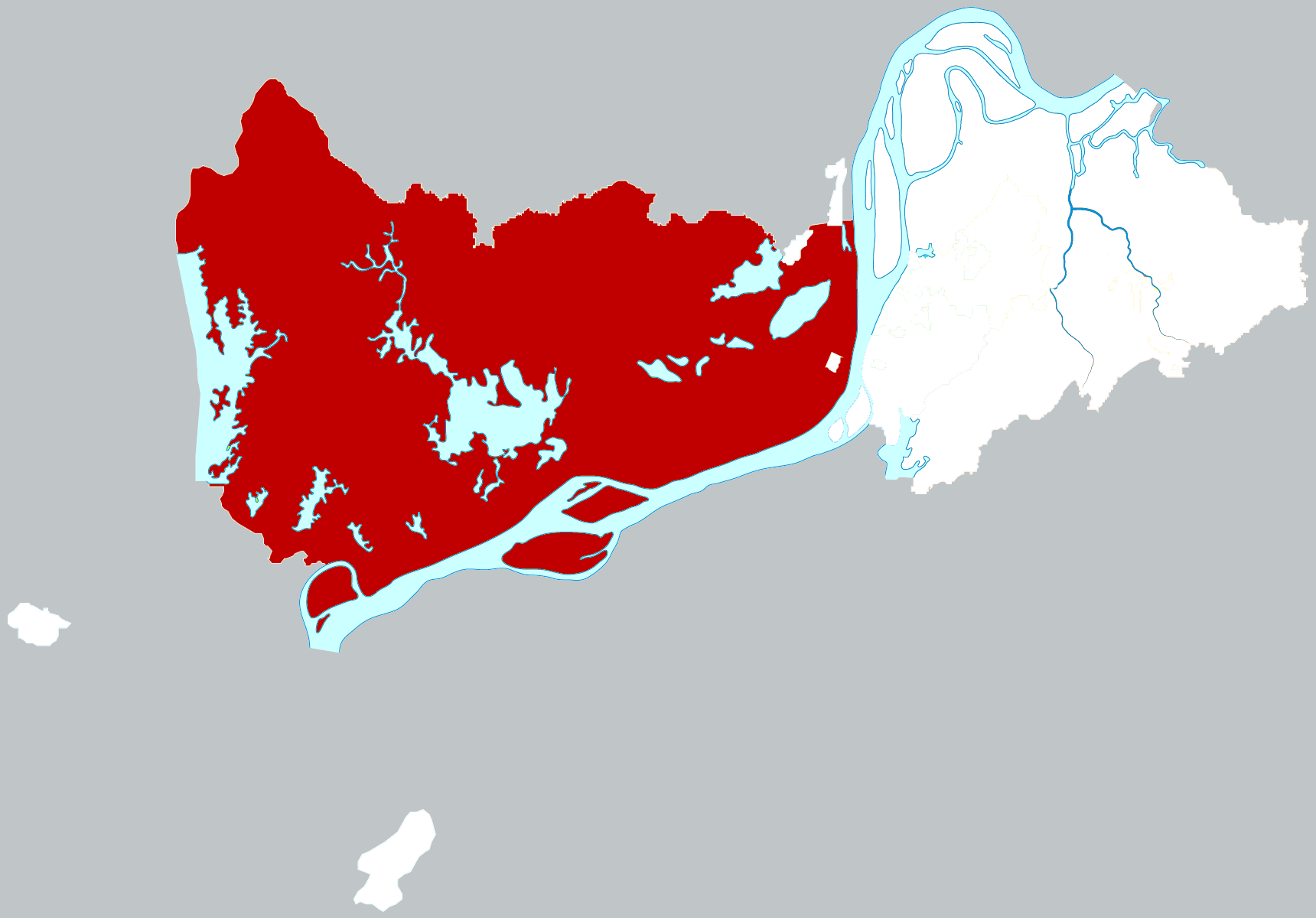
- Zongyang in Tongling
- Coordinates (Zongyang government): 30°42′22″N 117°15′02″E
- Country: China
- Province: Anhui
- Prefecture-level city: Tongling
- County seat: Zongyang Town

Area
  - Total: 1,473.43 km^{2} (568.89 sq mi)
- Elevation: 10 m (33 ft)

Population (2020)
  - Total: 469,051
  - Density: 318.340/km^{2} (824.496/sq mi)
- Time zone: UTC+8 (China Standard)
- Postal code: 246700
- Website: http://www.zongyang.gov.cn

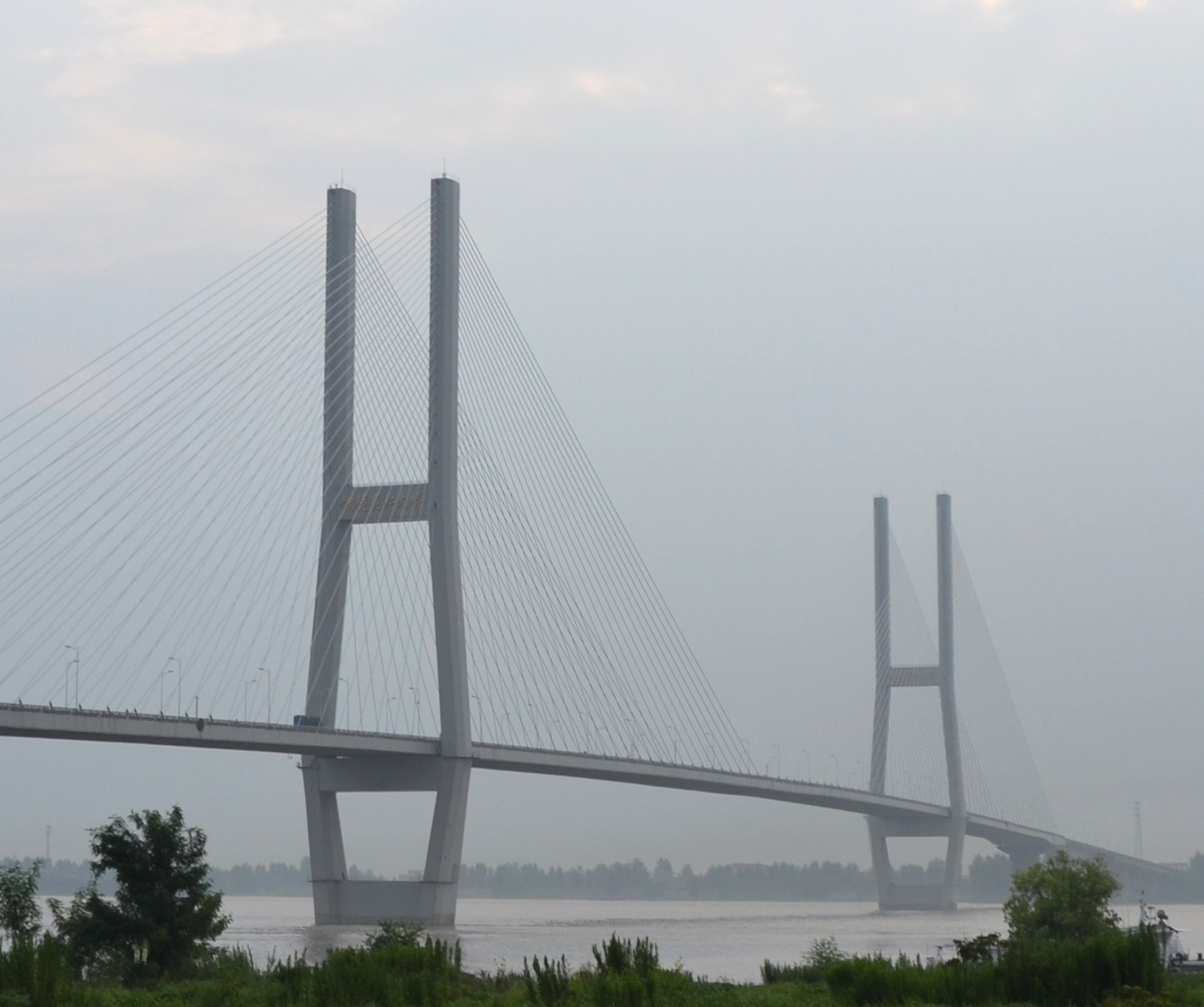
The Tongling Yangtze River Bridge in August 2012

Zongyang County (simplified Chinese: 枞阳县; traditional Chinese: 樅陽縣; pinyin: Zōngyáng Xiàn) is a county in southern Anhui province, located mostly on the northern (left) bank of the Yangtze River. It is under the jurisdiction of the prefecture-level city of Tongling. It has a population of 960,000 and an area of 1,808 square kilometres (698 sq mi). The government of Zongyang County is located in Zongyang Town (枞阳镇). On 13 October 2015, Zongyang County jurisdiction was transferred from Anqing to Tongling.

In the past, Zongyang County was named Tonglu County. In 1951, Tonglu County was changed to Hudong County. In 1954, the county seat was moved to Zongyang Town. On July 1, 1955, the name of the county in the Han dynasty was restored – Zongyang County. In January 2016, Zongyang County was officially placed under the jurisdiction of Tongling City by Anqing City.

== Administrative divisions ==
Zongyang County has jurisdiction over 15 towns, 1 township and one other area.

15 towns

- Hengbu (横埠镇), Xiangpu (项铺镇), Qianqiao (钱桥镇), Qilin (麒麟镇), Yijin (义津镇), Fushan (浮山镇), Huigong (会宫镇), Guanbuqiao (官埠桥镇), Qianpu (钱铺镇), Jinshe (金社镇), Bailiu (白柳镇), Yutan (雨坛镇), Zongyang (枞阳镇), Oushan (欧山镇), Tanggou (汤沟镇);

1 township

- Baimei Township (白梅乡)

Other area

- Zongyang Economic Development Area (枞阳经济开发区).

=== Historical divisions ===
Historical divisions of Guangshui:

Towns:

- Zongyang (枞阳镇), Oushan (𠙶山镇), Tanggou (汤沟镇), Laozhou (老洲镇), Chenyaohu (陈瑶湖镇), Zhoutan (周潭镇), Hengbu (横埠镇), Xiangpu (项铺镇), Qianqiao (钱桥镇), Qilin (麒麟镇), Yijin (义津镇), Fushan (浮山镇), Guanbuqiao (官埠桥镇)

Townships:

- Tietong Township (铁铜乡), Fengyi Township (凤仪乡), Changsha Township (长沙乡), Qianpu Township (钱铺乡), Jinshe Township (金社乡), Baimei Township (白梅乡), Baihu Township (白湖乡), Huigong Township (会宫乡), Yutan Township (雨坛乡)

== Dialect ==
The Zongyang dialect (simplified Chinese: 枞阳话; traditional Chinese: 樅陽話; pinyin: Zōngyáng Huà) is a dialect of Lower Yangtze Mandarin which is spoken in Zongyang County.

== Climate ==
Climate data for Zongyang, elevation 58 m (190 ft), (1991–2020 normals, extremes 1991–present)
Month	Jan	Feb	Mar	Apr	May	Jun	Jul	Aug	Sep	Oct	Nov	Dec	Year
Record high °C (°F)	22.2 (72.0)	27.2 (81.0)	31.8 (89.2)	33.0 (91.4)	35.6 (96.1)	37.2 (99.0)	40.7 (105.3)	40.5 (104.9)	37.7 (99.9)	35.1 (95.2)	29.1 (84.4)	21.7 (71.1)	40.7 (105.3)
Mean daily maximum °C (°F)	7.7 (45.9)	10.2 (50.4)	16.5 (61.7)	22.7 (72.9)	27.1 (80.8)	29.3 (84.7)	32.5 (90.5)	33.1 (91.6)	28.4 (83.1)	23.0 (73.4)	16.9 (62.4)	10.0 (50.0)	21.5 (70.6)
Daily mean °C (°F)	4.0 (39.2)	6.0 (42.8)	11.6 (52.9)	17.4 (63.3)	22.2 (72.0)	25.1 (77.2)	28.3 (82.9)	28.4 (83.1)	23.6 (74.5)	18.2 (64.8)	12.4 (54.3)	5.8 (42.4)	16.9 (62.4)
Mean daily minimum °C (°F)	1.3 (34.3)	2.9 (37.2)	7.8 (46.0)	13.2 (55.8)	18.3 (64.9)	22.0 (71.6)	25.1 (77.2)	25.1 (77.2)	20.3 (68.5)	14.7 (58.5)	9.2 (48.6)	2.7 (36.9)	13.5 (56.4)
Record low °C (°F)	−8.5 (16.7)	−6.8 (19.8)	−2.6 (27.3)	3.0 (37.4)	9.3 (48.7)	15.9 (60.6)	17.3 (63.1)	17.3 (63.1)	12.1 (53.8)	6.8 (44.2)	−3.2 (26.2)	−9.1 (15.6)	−9.1 (15.6)
Average precipitation mm (inches)	62.9 (2.48)	78.2 (3.08)	120.3 (4.74)	135.2 (5.32)	174.5 (6.87)	274.6 (10.81)	219.0 (8.62)	136.0 (5.35)	58.6 (2.31)	60.5 (2.38)	63.2 (2.49)	37.4 (1.47)	1,420.4 (55.92)
Average precipitation days (≥ 0.1 mm)	11.0	10.8	13.6	12.0	11.9	12.9	11.5	11.1	7.4	8.2	8.8	7.8	127
Average snowy days	4.6	2.2	0.8	0	0	0	0	0	0	0	0.4	1.6	9.6
Average relative humidity (%)	75	75	72	72	74	79	78	78	77	73	75	72	75
Mean monthly sunshine hours	105.8	101.1	148.5	164.9	179.4	152.0	216.9	204.6	163.3	156.9	141.3	131.9	1,866.6
Percentage possible sunshine	33	32	40	42	42	36	51	50	44	45	45	42	42
Source: China Meteorological Administration
