= Architecture of Jiangxi =

Architectural style

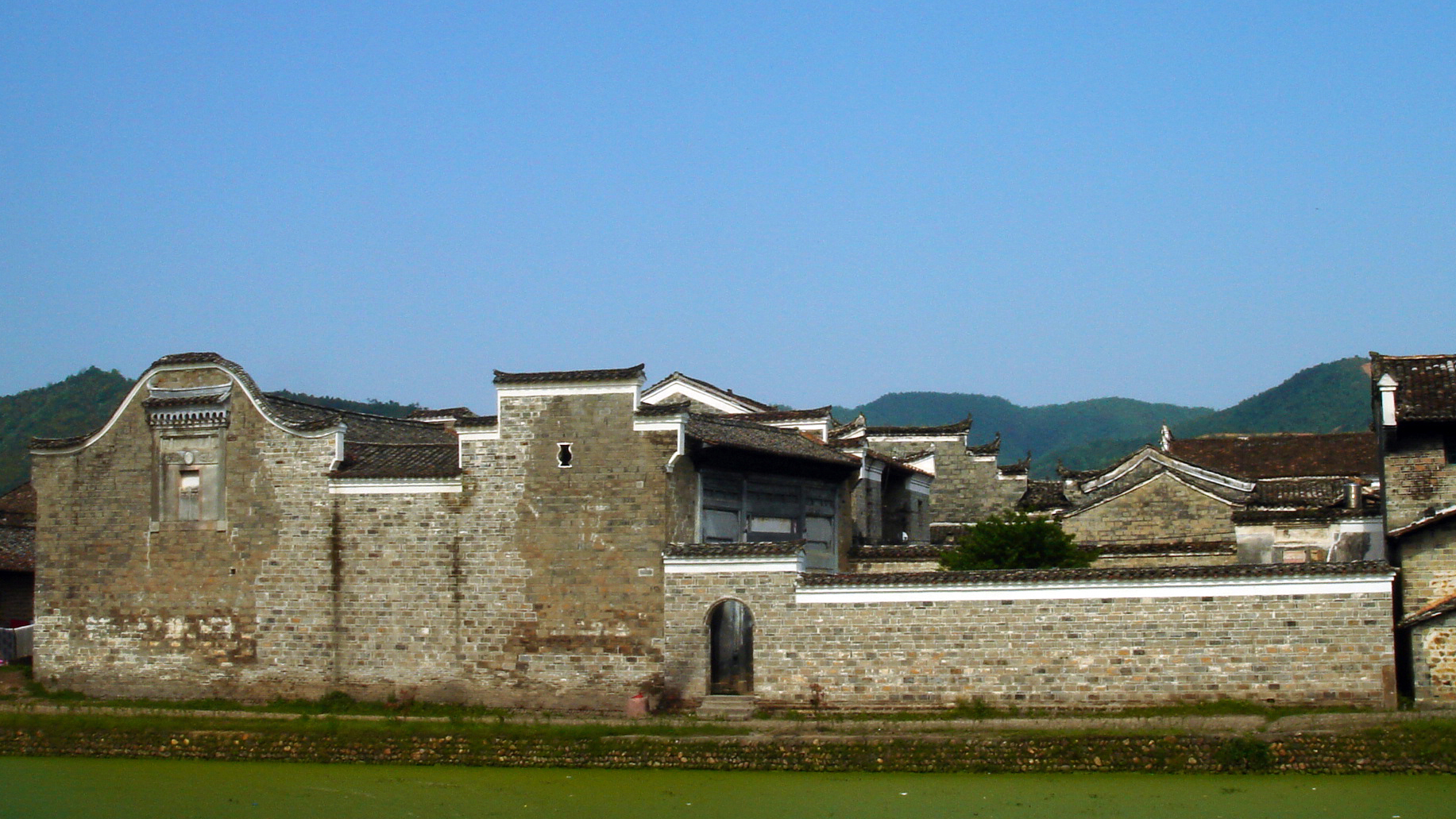
Traditional residences in Liukeng village of Le'an County, in Jiangxi.

Architecture of Jiangxi refers to the traditional masonry houses, residential compounds, monuments, and academies built in Jiangxi of East China.

== Overview ==
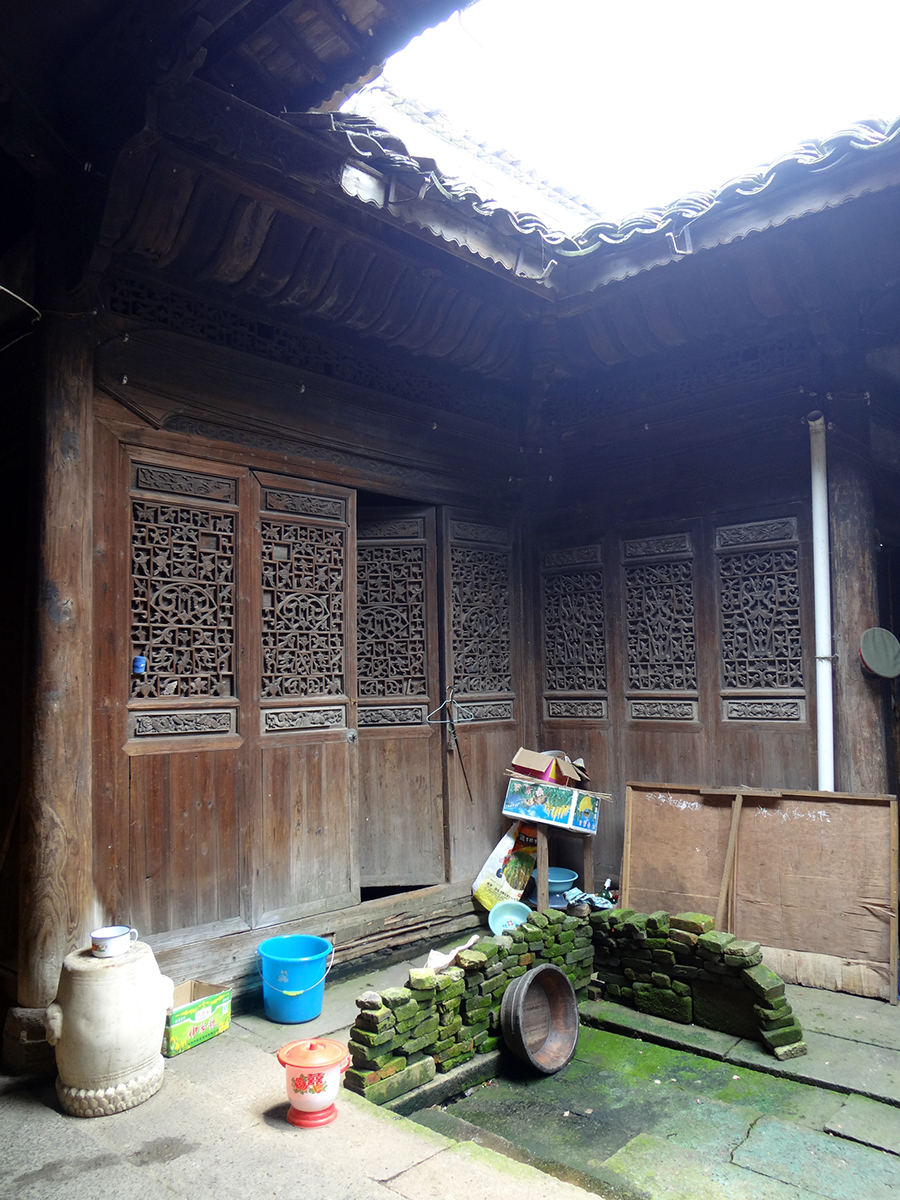
Tianjing inside a residence of Fengcheng

The architecture of Jiangxi is renowned for its exterior and interior design, relating to the surrounding context and settings by using Fengshui principles. It is defined as an architectural style that the intersections of closely spaced buildings, surrounded by brick walls, form a relatively enclosed courtyard. This kind of enclosure, called "Tianjing" (Chinese: 天井; lit. 'sky well') is quite similar to the Roman impluvium and serves in temperature regulation and in venting the building complexes.

Natural materials are highly preferred. Raw materials, such as stone, wood, and brick, are abundantly used for the respect for nature. Stone, as the fundamental part in the construction, is variable across different regions; sandstone, limestone, granite are the most frequent choices. Wood is generally used for the framework of buildings, because of its warmth and workability. Compared to the style in surrounding regions like Zhejiang or Anhui where outer walls are painted white with quicklime, bricks are explicitly viewed in Jiangxi architecture, which therefore demands well-developed techniques to produce fine bricks.

The traditional architectures still preserved in Jiangxi were mostly built during the Ming dynasty and Qing dynasty. These buildings are characterized by gables of dark bricks, with white lines under eaves, covered by black tiles. They are often elaborately decorated by wood, stone and brick carvings, ink painting, clay sculpture, and sometimes with Nuoxi elements.

== Architectural features ==
Distinct from its counterparts in surrounding regions, Jiangxi architecture has a series of characteristics that differs from its neighbours' styles in many ways. The exterior of Jiangxi architecture is tall brick walls that dominantly favour the original colour of bricks, with a slight white line painted with quicklime under the roof tiles, but this is done otherwise in Zhejiang and southern Anhui where walls are entirely painted white. (Wuyuan County of Jiangxi and some places around it are consistent with the style of Anhui and Zhejiang) Also, Jiangxi people are used to living on the ground floor within the residence and thus, Jiangxi architecture generally consists of one storey and a half (the half storey is used for storage), whereas architectures of Zhejiang and Anhui are often two-storeyed or even more.

Meanwhile, Tulou (commonly called Weiwu in Jiangxi) of Hakka people can be found in the southmost counties of Jiangxi, like Longnan, Quannan, Dingnan, because of the geographic neighbourhood with western Fujian and northern Guangdong.

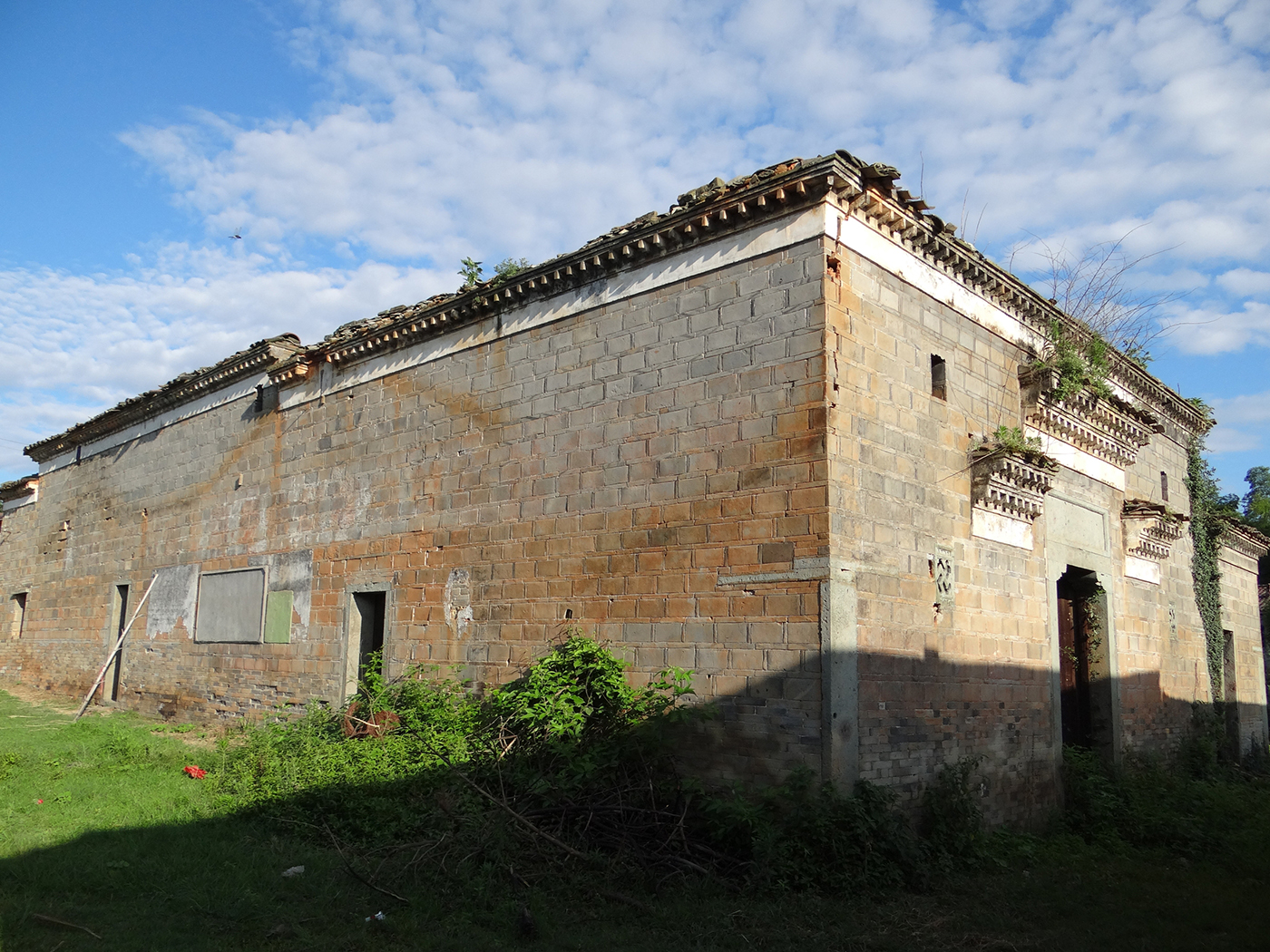
Jiangxi architecture

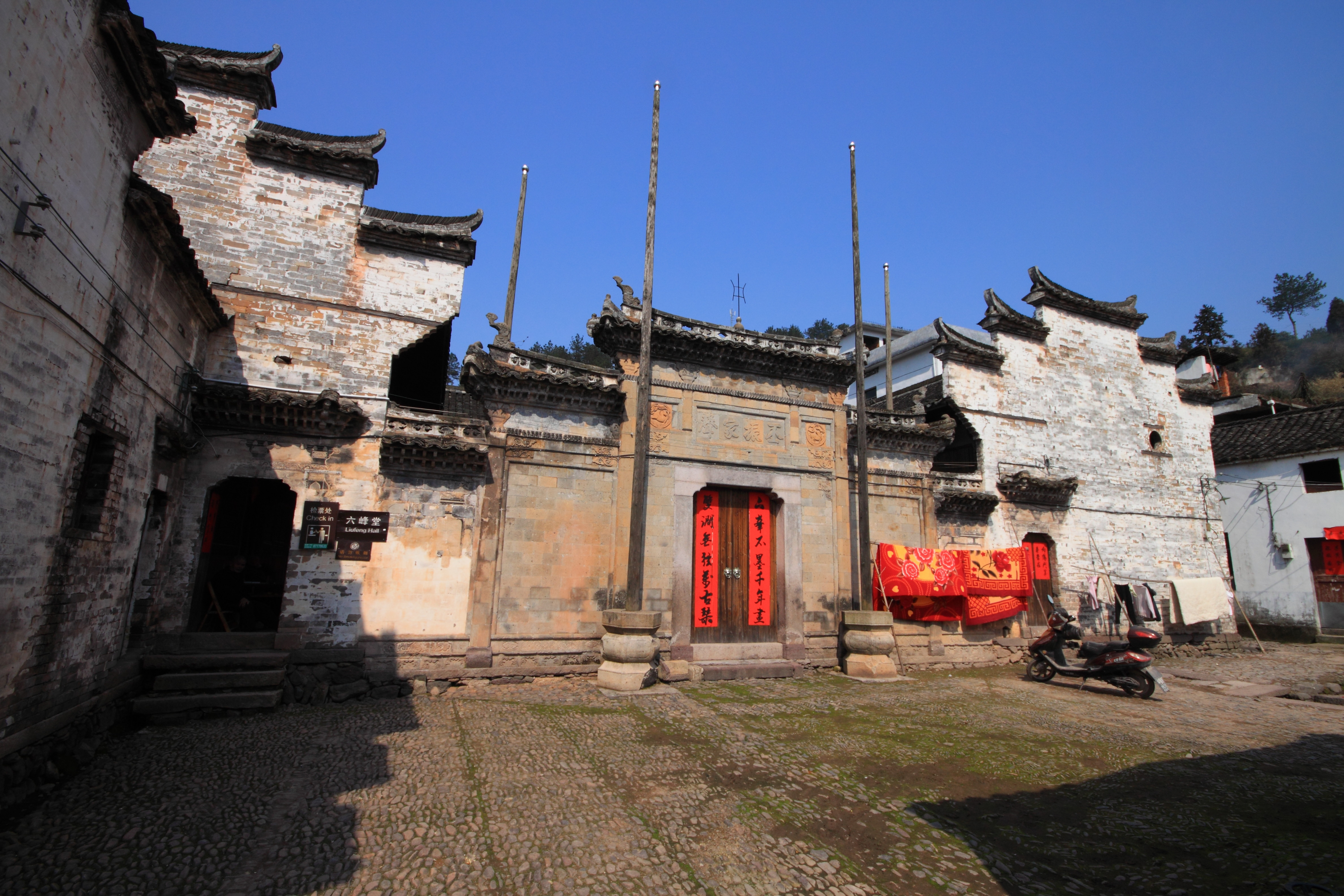
Zhejiang architecture

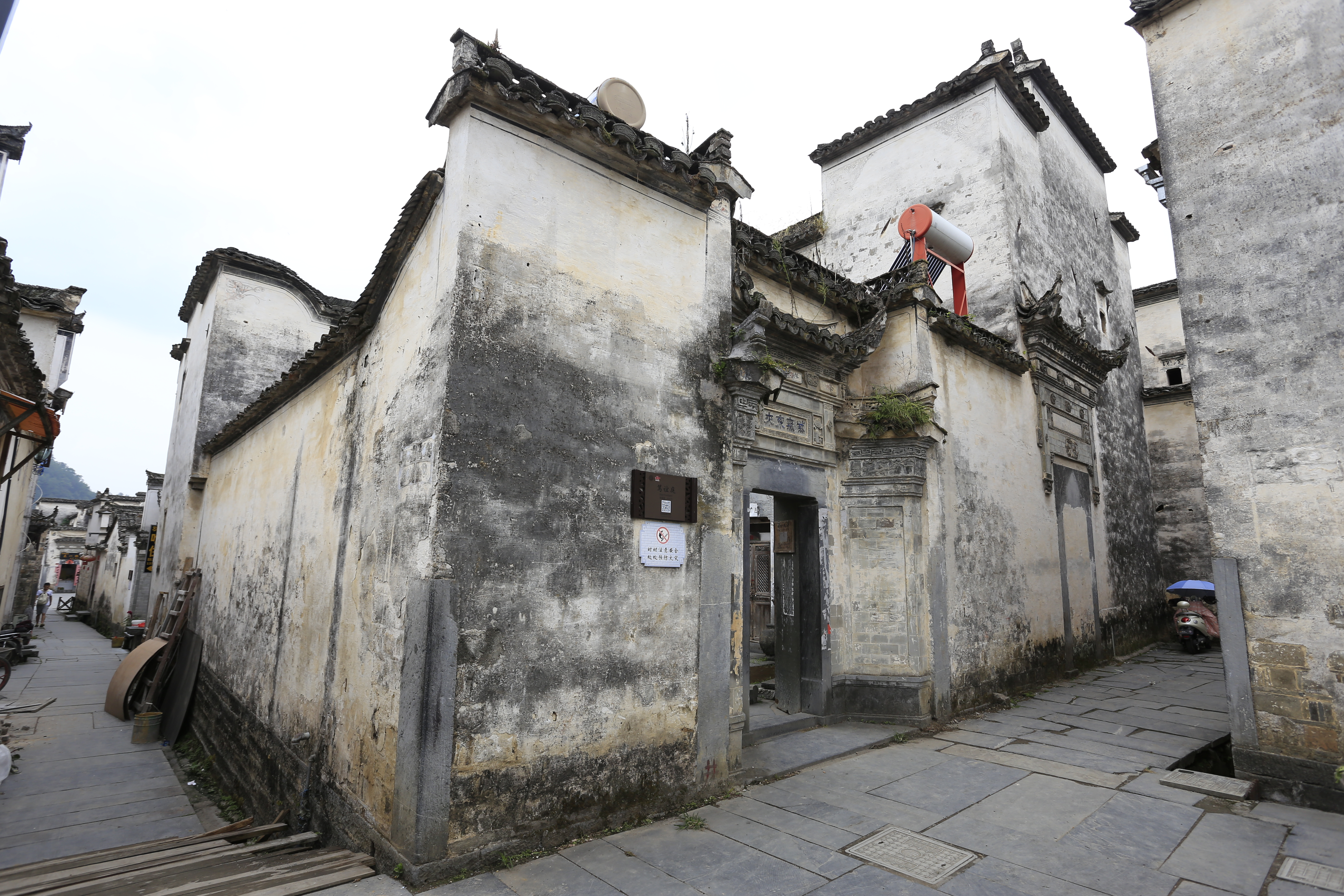
Anhui architecture

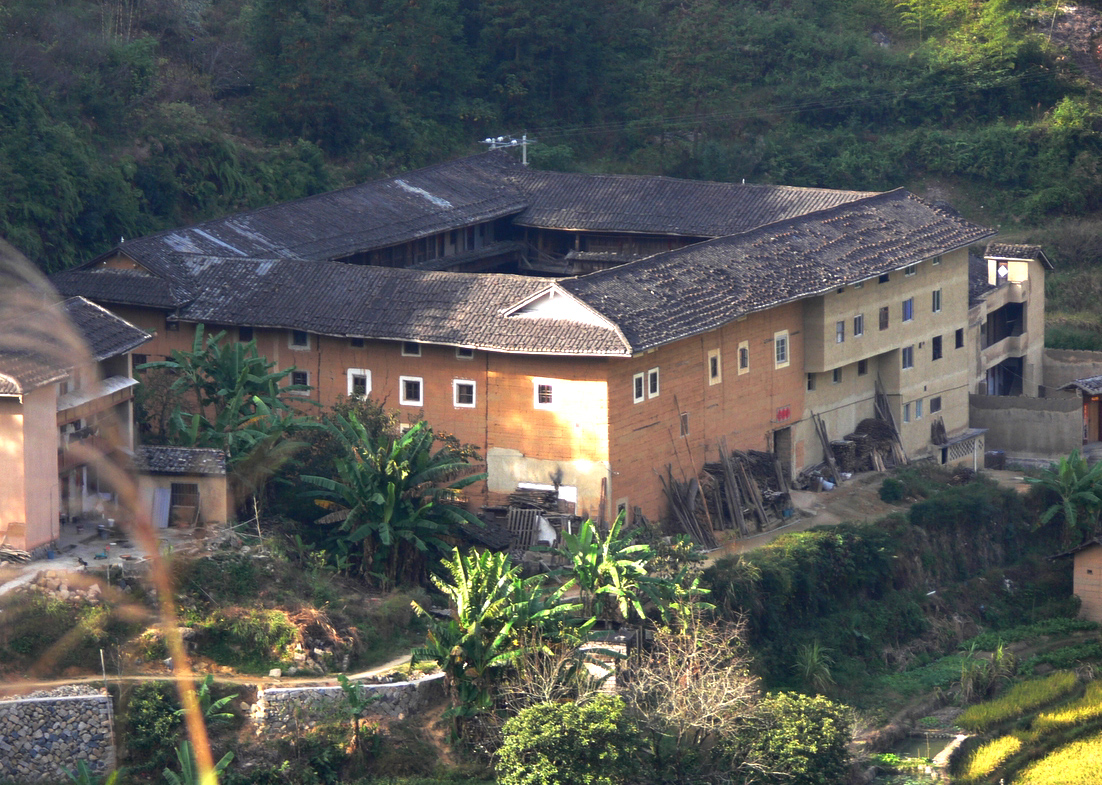
Hakka architecture

== History ==
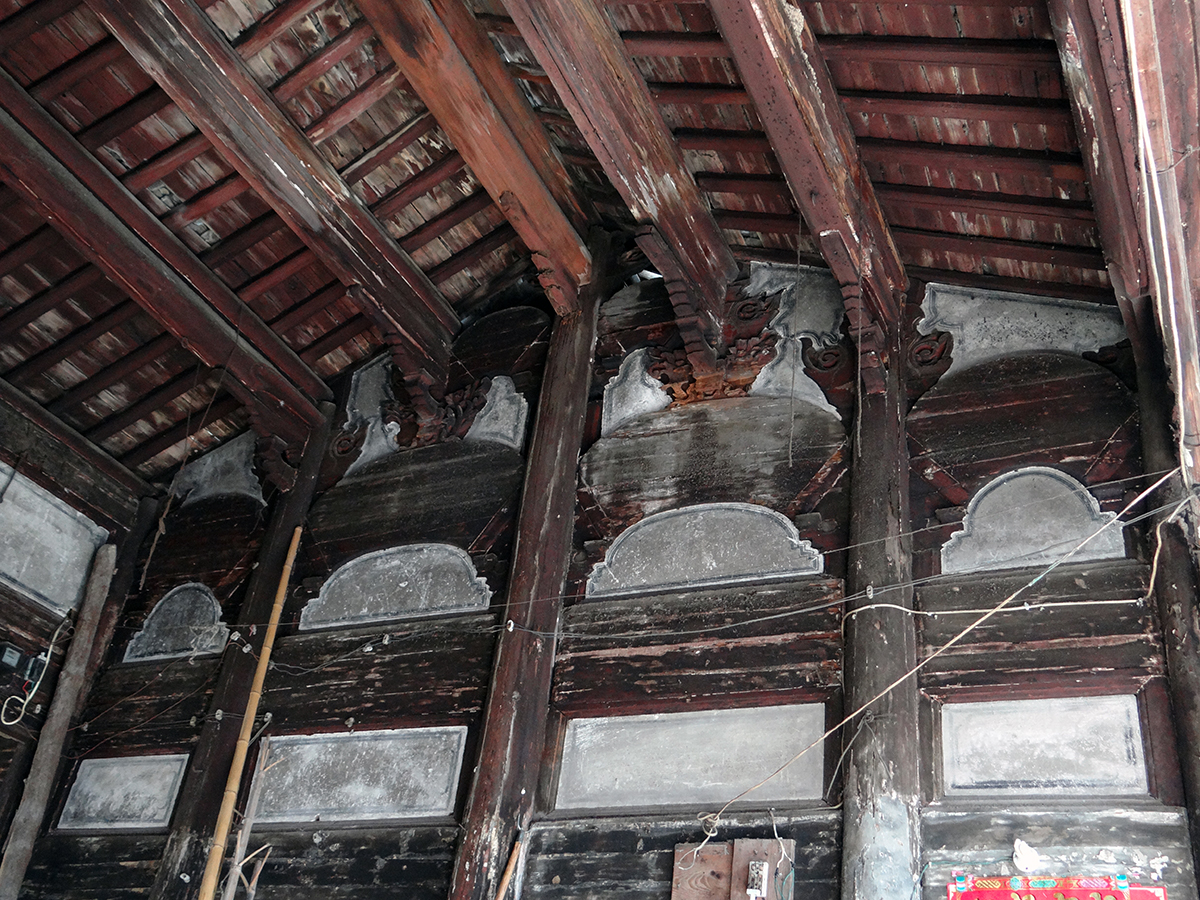
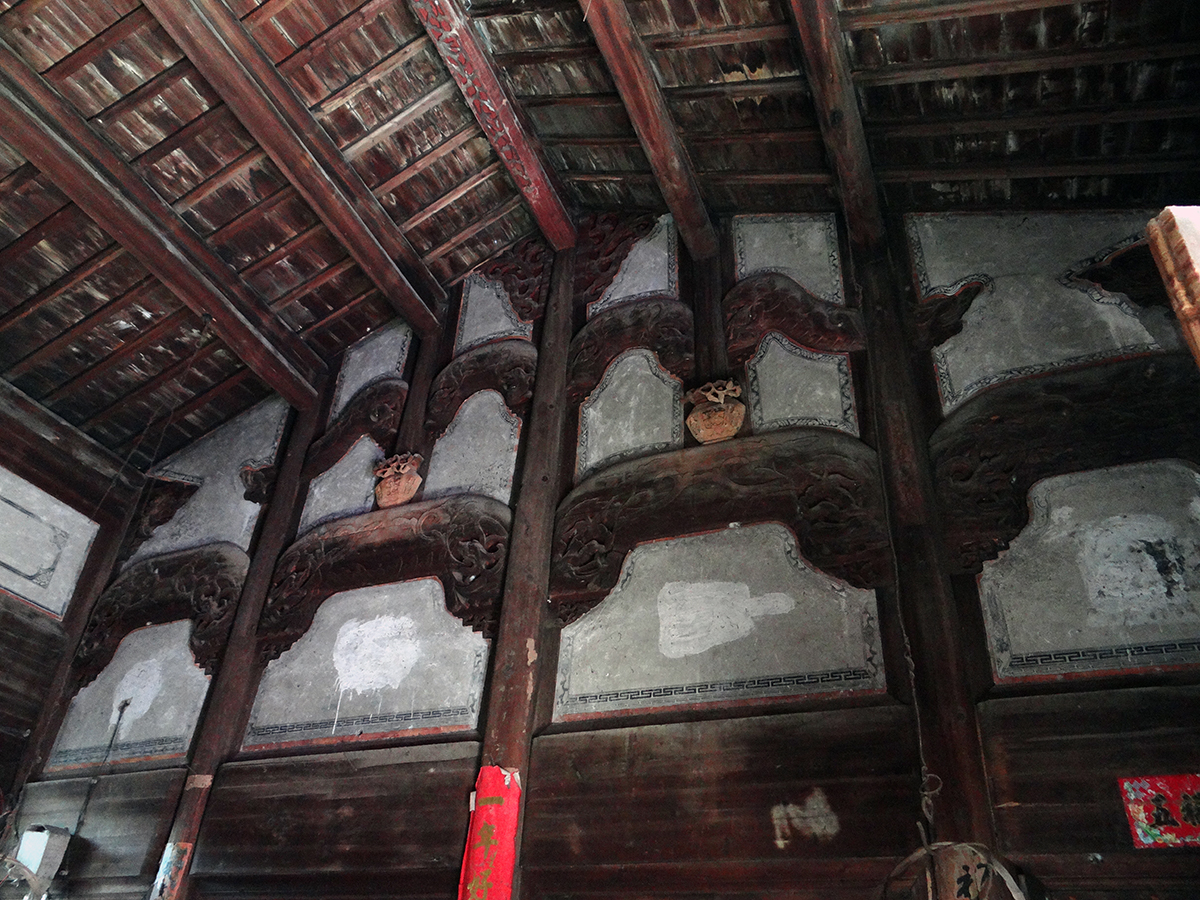
Comparison of 17th-century and 19th-century residences in Yihuang County

=== 15th to 16th century ===
This period refers to the early and middle Ming dynasty when China enjoyed an economic prosperity, and it can be witnessed by the grandiose features of architecture in Jiangxi. Despite the small number of surviving buildings, their architectural features genuinely reflect the style of this period. Structural elements like dougong were generally used, and the selection of raw materials was mainly those of big volume. In decorative carvings, animals like elephants, horses, qilin, phoenix are very representative at this time.

=== 17th to 18th century ===
Jiangxi saw a large regress in economy as well as in other fields during this period due to the warfare and some natural disasters. While earlier style of grandeur could still be perceived, budgets of house building were relatively limited which led to a minimalist style in decoration. Geometric patterns and symbols of goodwill are the main theme of carvings.

=== 19th century to present ===
Stimulated by a national trend of sophisticated aesthetics and also by improvements of handcraft, Jiangxi architecture evolved into an elaborately decorated style. Carvings often took much more time than house building, while structural beauty was no longer the focus in architectural design. The use of dougong was largely reduced, and some decorative parts were even coloured with mineral pigments.

By the time Communism began to take shape in Jiangxi at the start of the 20th century, many of its architecture would be influenced by Stalinist socialist realism based on its Soviet designs.

== Fengshui design ==
Fengshui theories have been playing an important role in the entire course of construction, for instance, choosing the site, house direction, etc..

=== Jiangxi school ===
Jiangxi school (Chinese: 江西派), also called Xingshi school (Chinese: 形势派; lit. 'school of location') is a prominent school in Chinese Fengshui, which emphasizes the harmony between nature and human, namely between environment and residents. Yang Yunsong (Chinese: 杨筠松) is the founder of this school.

== Building types ==
=== Memorial architecture ===
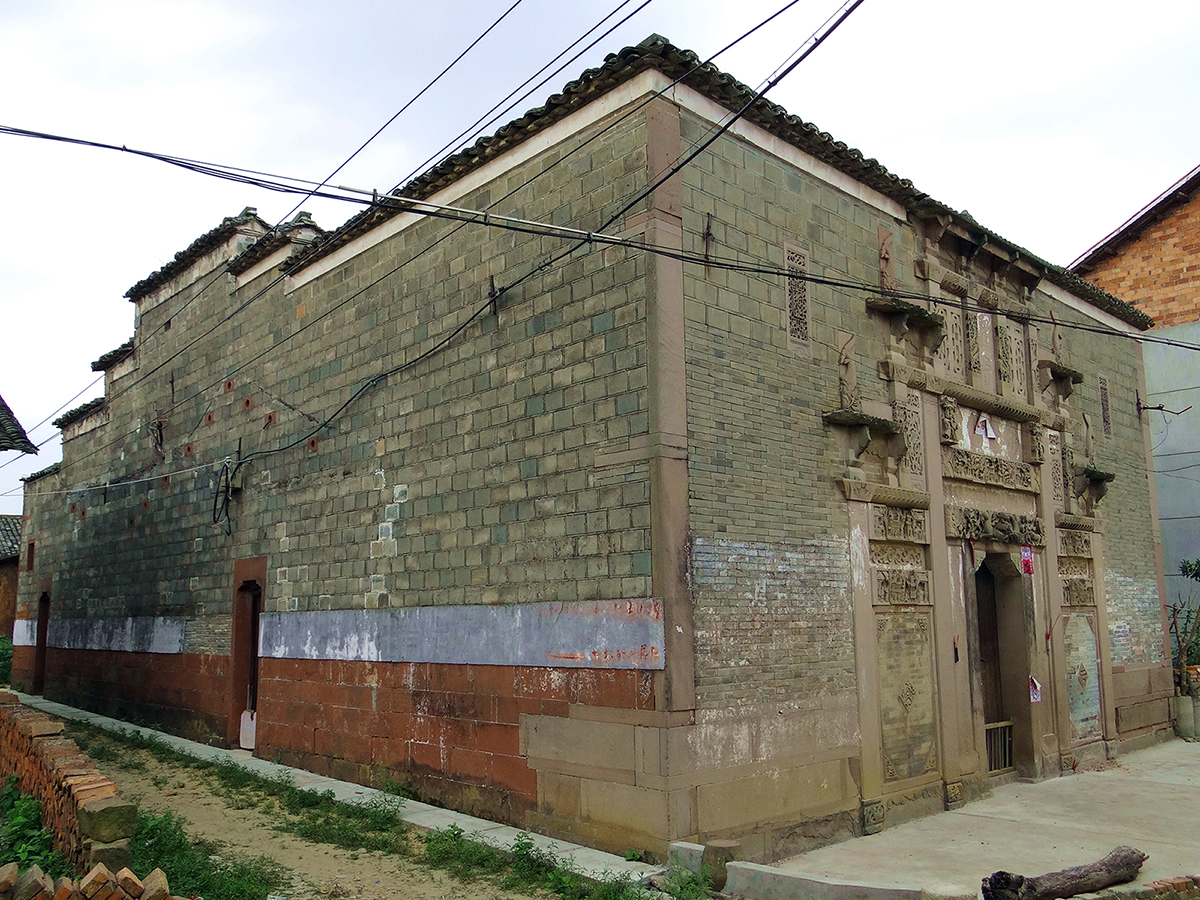
Paifang (memorial arch) in Nanchang

=== Educational architecture ===
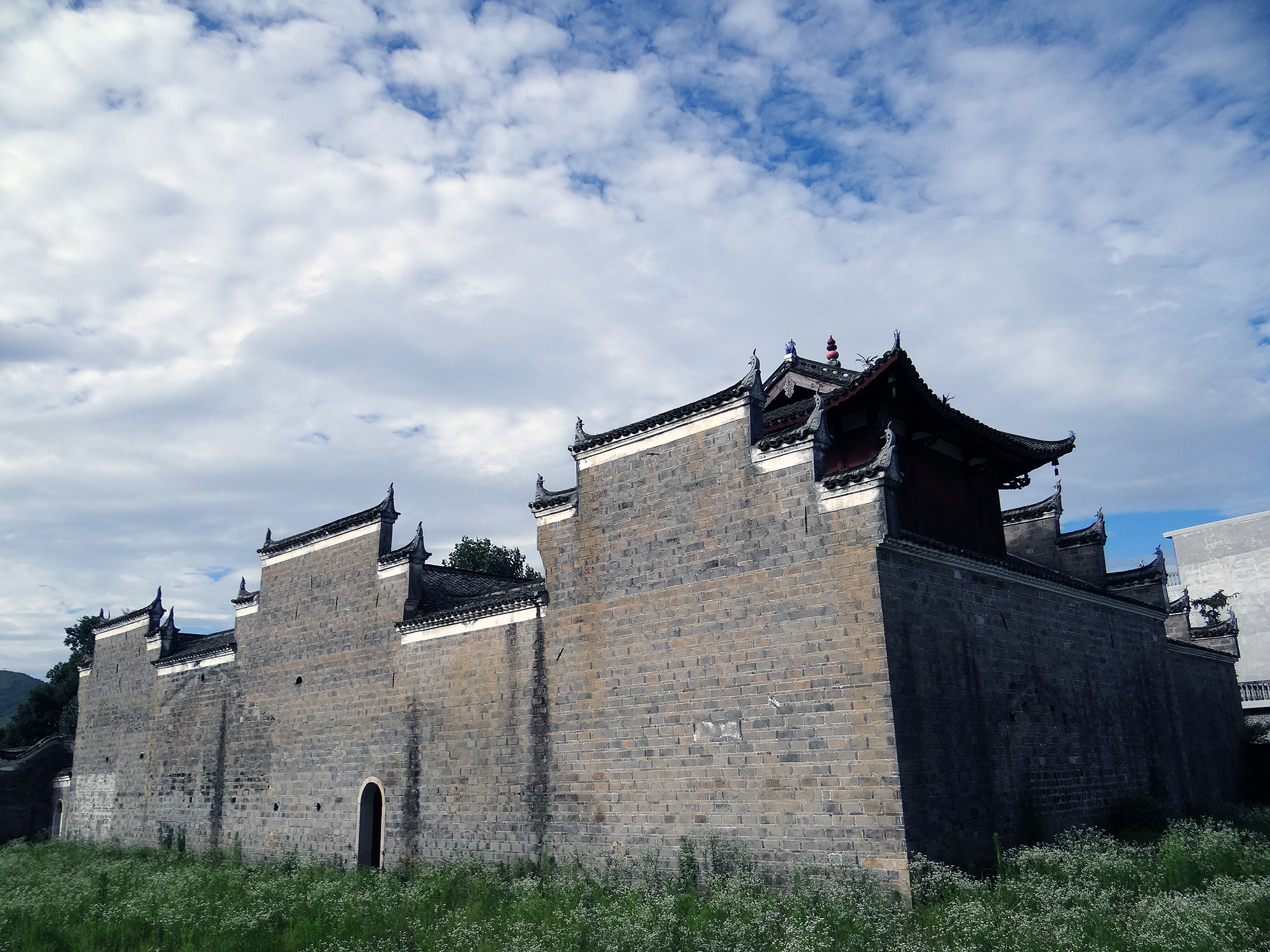
Confucian academy in Fuzhou

=== Religious architecture ===
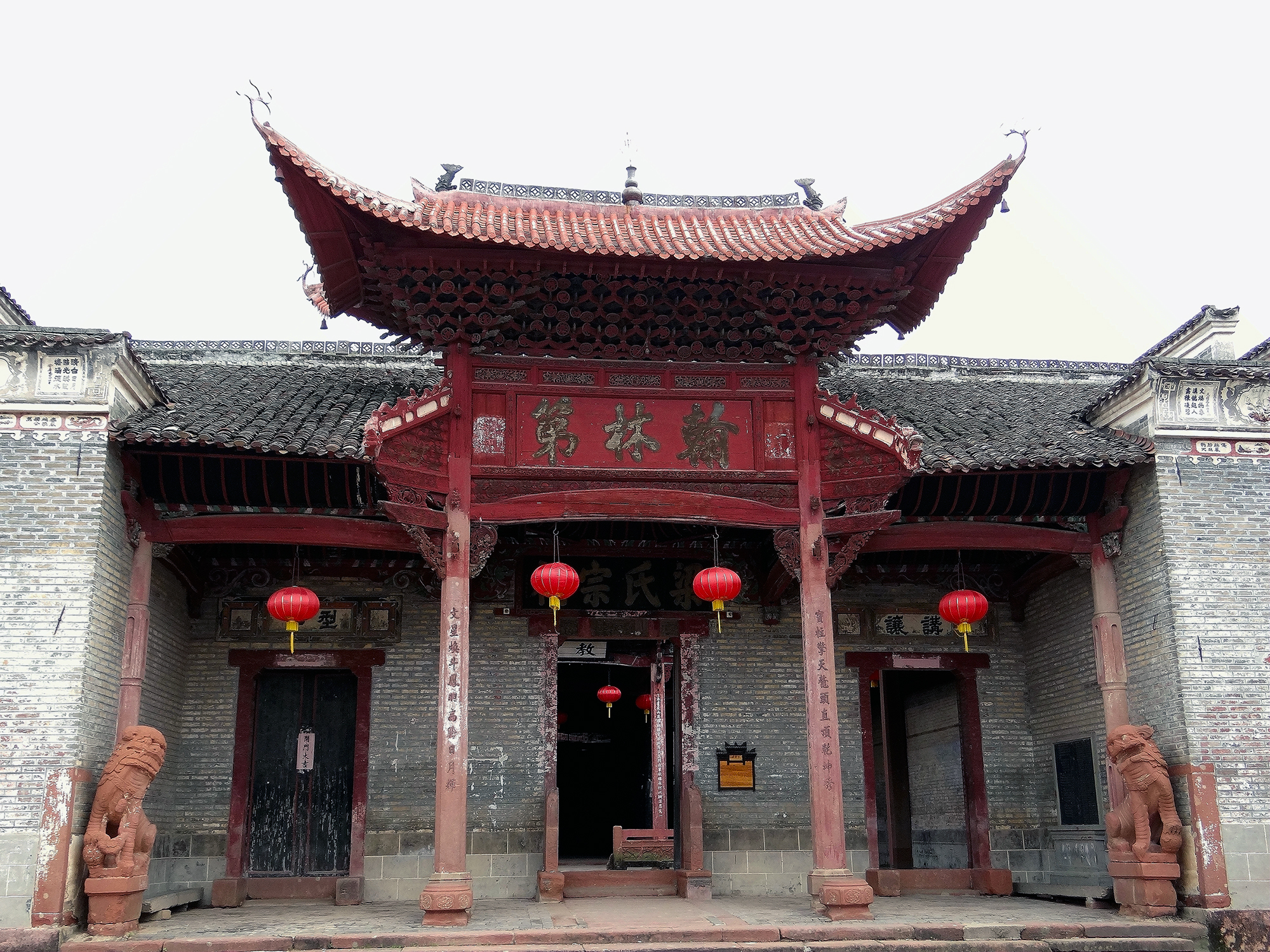
Ancestral shrine in Ji'an

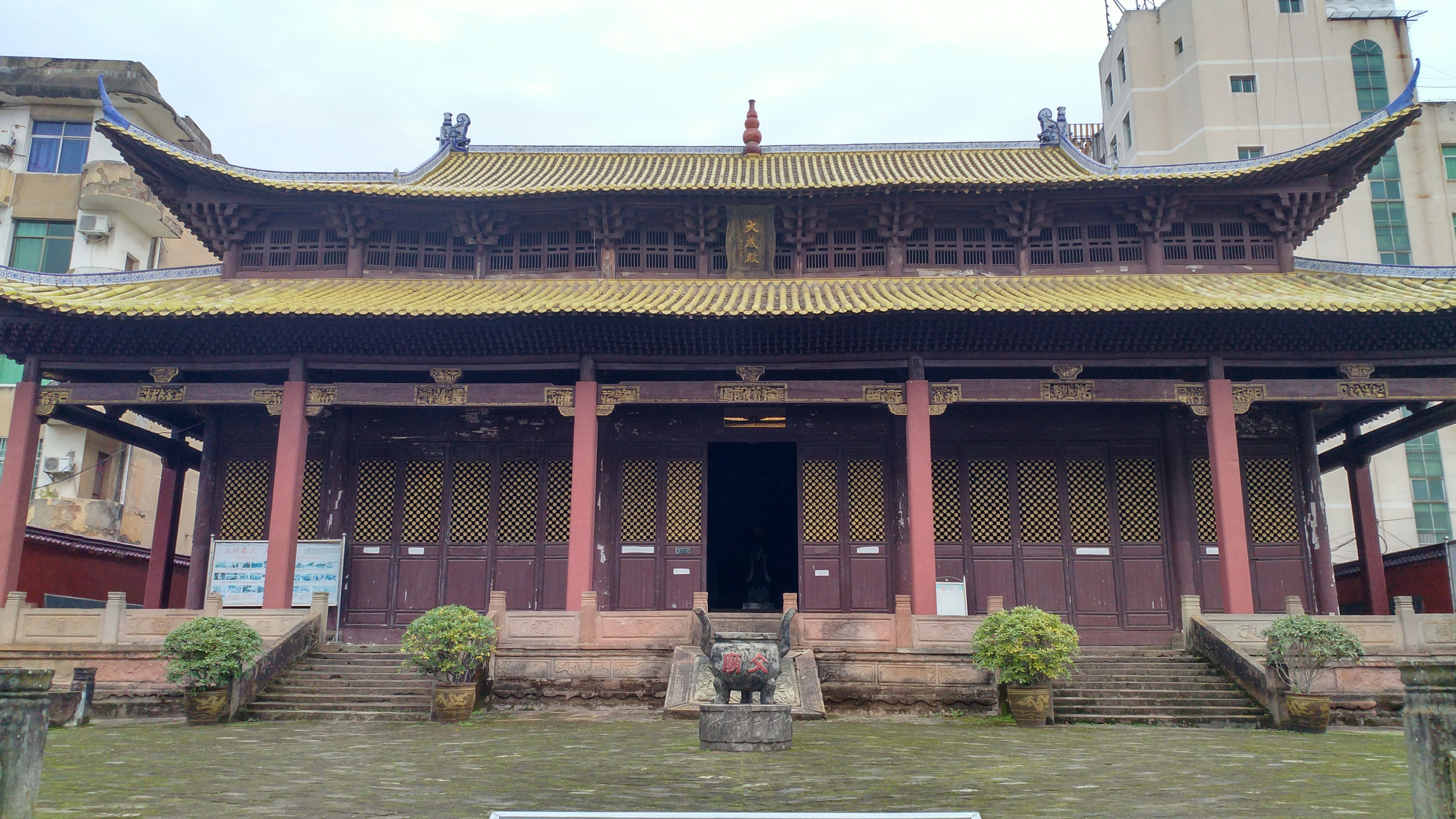
Confucian temple in Poyang

== Decorative structures ==
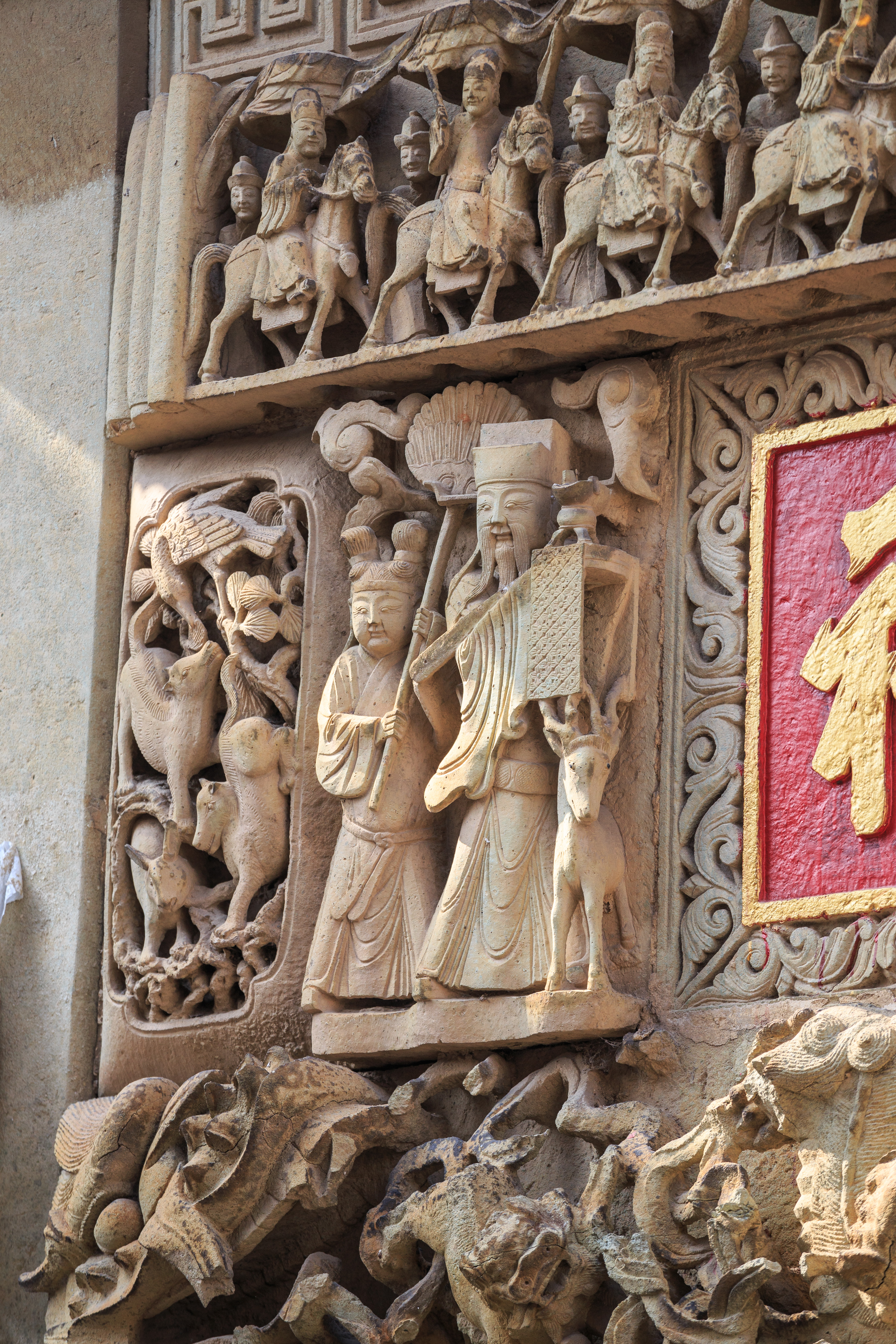
Stone carving in Shangrao

=== Stone carving ===
Stone carving in Jiangxi architecture is very much outstanding as Jiangxi has abundant resources of many kinds of stones. Roughly speaking, sandstone is preferred in western Jiangxi and limestone is usually seen in the east, while granite is typically used in northwestern region. However, the combination of different stones can also be viewed for seeking aesthetics. Stone is elaborately carved, especially at entrance door, column bases and other visible parts inside the building.

=== Wood carving ===
As a major aspect in interior decoration, wood carving often costs the most time and money in the construction. In consequence, carpenters are greatly valued and respected. The content of wood carving are often inspired from historical stories or traditional cultures, such as Wufu, Shou, 24 Xiao, etc..

=== Brick carving ===
Brick carving is comparatively less often applied in Jiangxi architecture, however, classic work can still be found. A renowned example is a residence in Yihuang County, built in 1755, and its entire entrance is decorated with finely carved bricks.

== Infrastructure ==
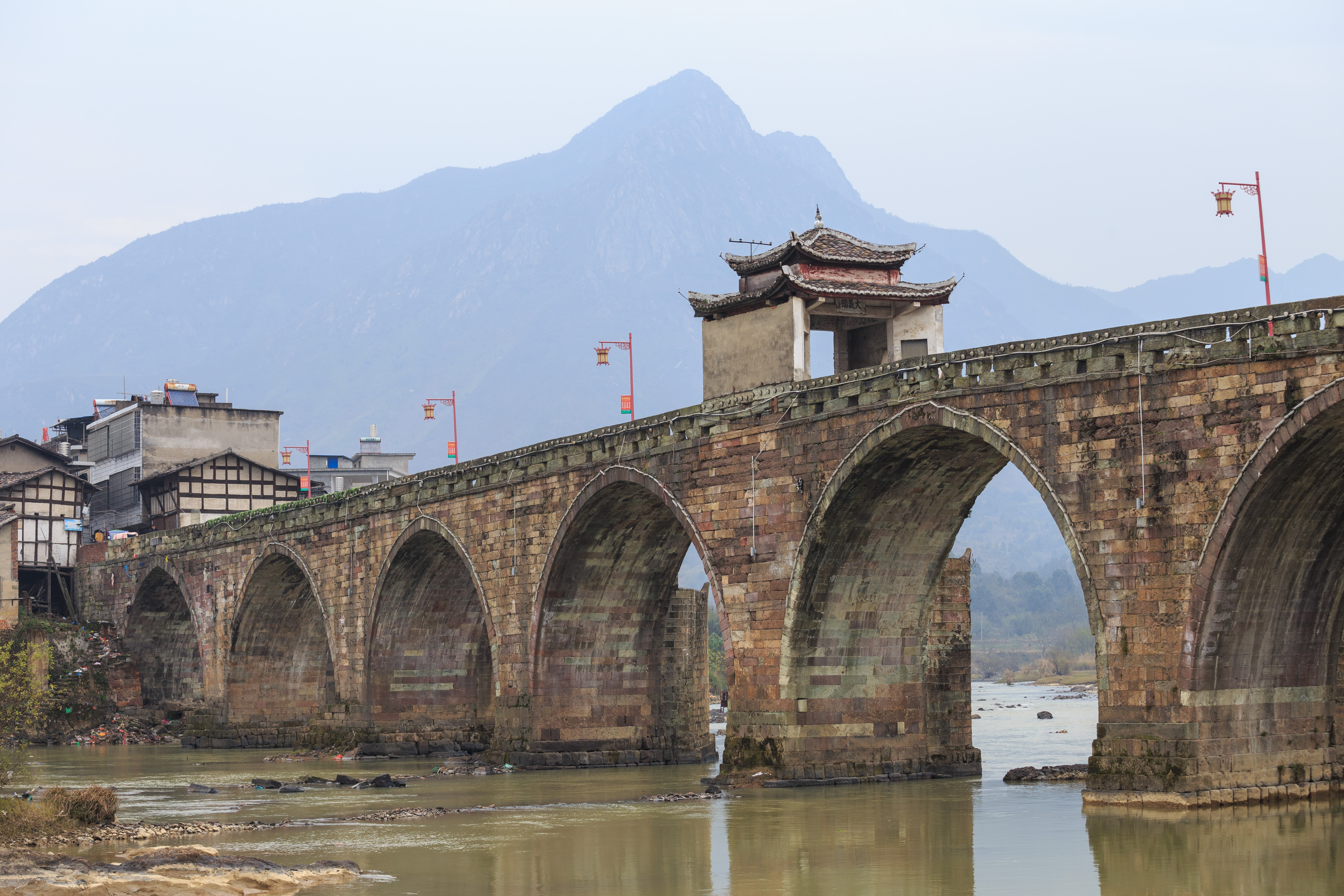
A bridge in Yanshan, Shangrao

== Significant buildings and areas ==
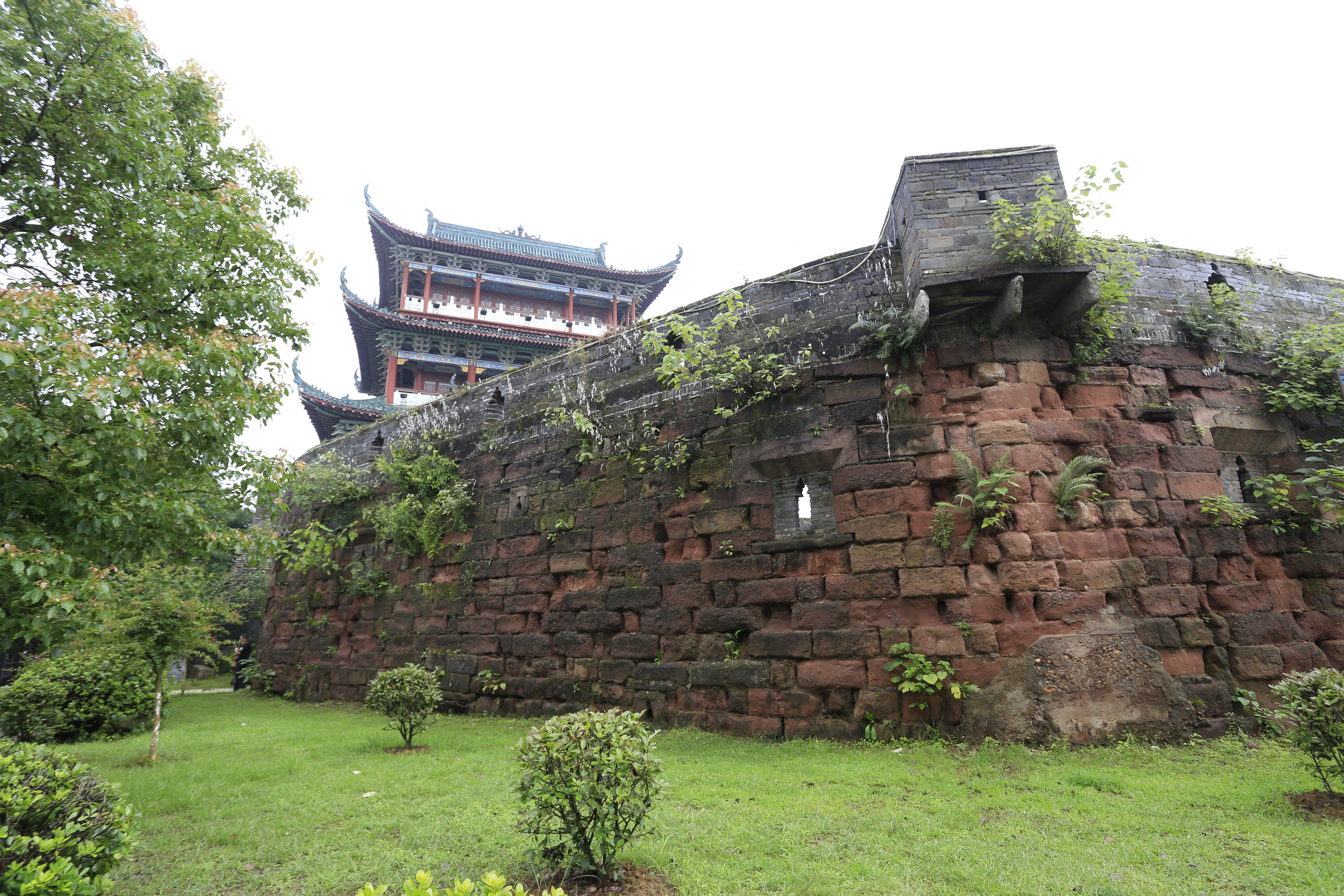
City walls in Ganzhou

=== Major National Historical and Cultural Sites ===
- White Deer Grotto Academy, one of the Four Great Academies of China
- Traditional Architecture of Liukeng Village
- Paifang of Grave of Zhu Shi
- Yuanzhou Drum Tower
- Ehu Academy
- Bailuzhou Academy
- Paifang of Chen Family
- Qingyunpu, residence of Bada Shanren
- Guanyin Bridge
- Mingshui Bridge
- Fengqu Bridge
- Wannian Bridge
- Ganzhou City Walls
- Wan'an City Walls
- Ancestral shrine of Jia family
- Longxuetushi Paifang and Cishichuanfang Paifang
- Confucian Temple of Anfu
- Wanshou Palace of Fuzhou
- Yuceshanguan and Yutingbieshu villas
- Shiwuli residence of Yiqian

== Influence on neighbourhood ==
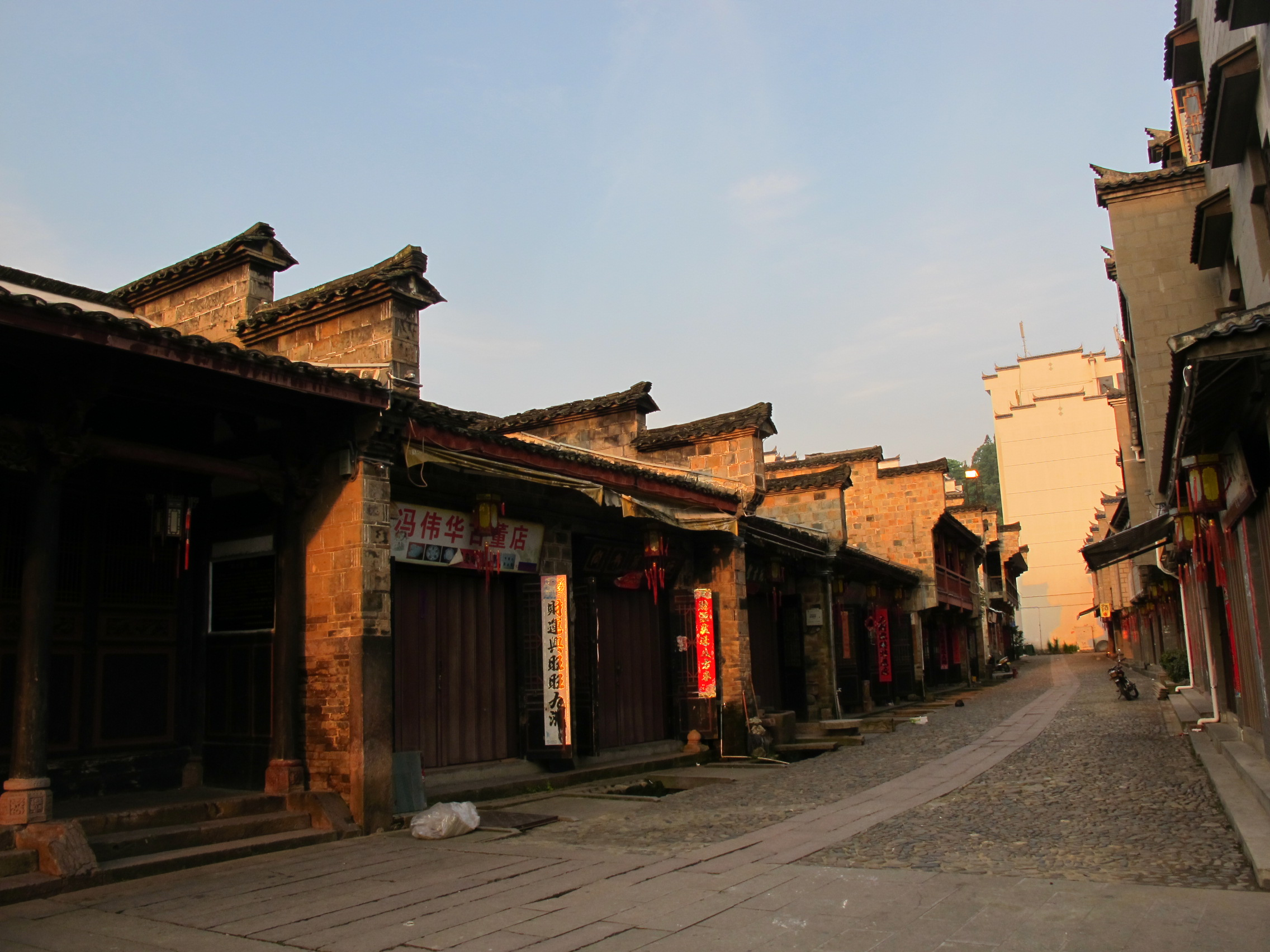
Old town of Taining, Fujian

Significant migrations from Jiangxi to its neighbouring regions took place several times in the last millennium, which profoundly changed the demographics of these regions. Jiangxi culture, as a consequence, has been spread as far as southwestern China, and this can be witnessed in linguistic aspect as well as in architecture.

It is noted that eastern Hunan, southeastern Hubei, southwestern Anhui and northwestern Fujian are the major destinations of historical Jiangxi migrants. Many features of the architecture of Jiangxi are preserved in these regions, although architectural adaptations to local environment should also be taken into account. Zhanguying Village of Hunan is a notable example.

== Regional variation ==
There are regional variations within Jiangxi architecture. Gan River is regarded as the dividing line, west of which the use of "Tianjing" (sky well) decreased to such an extent that Tianjing, especially in Ji'an, is primarily used in ancestral shrines to set up some architectural hierarchy. Moreover, architectures in Ji'an tend to be more coloured than other regions in Jiangxi, since wood carvings and clay sculptures are often painted in decoration. As for the architectural framework, wooden beams of a building in the west of Gan River are usually laid directly on the inner walls, instead of on the columns.

== See also ==
- Cantonese architecture
- Chinese architecture
