= Wannian Bridge (Nancheng County) =

Wannian Bridge 万年桥
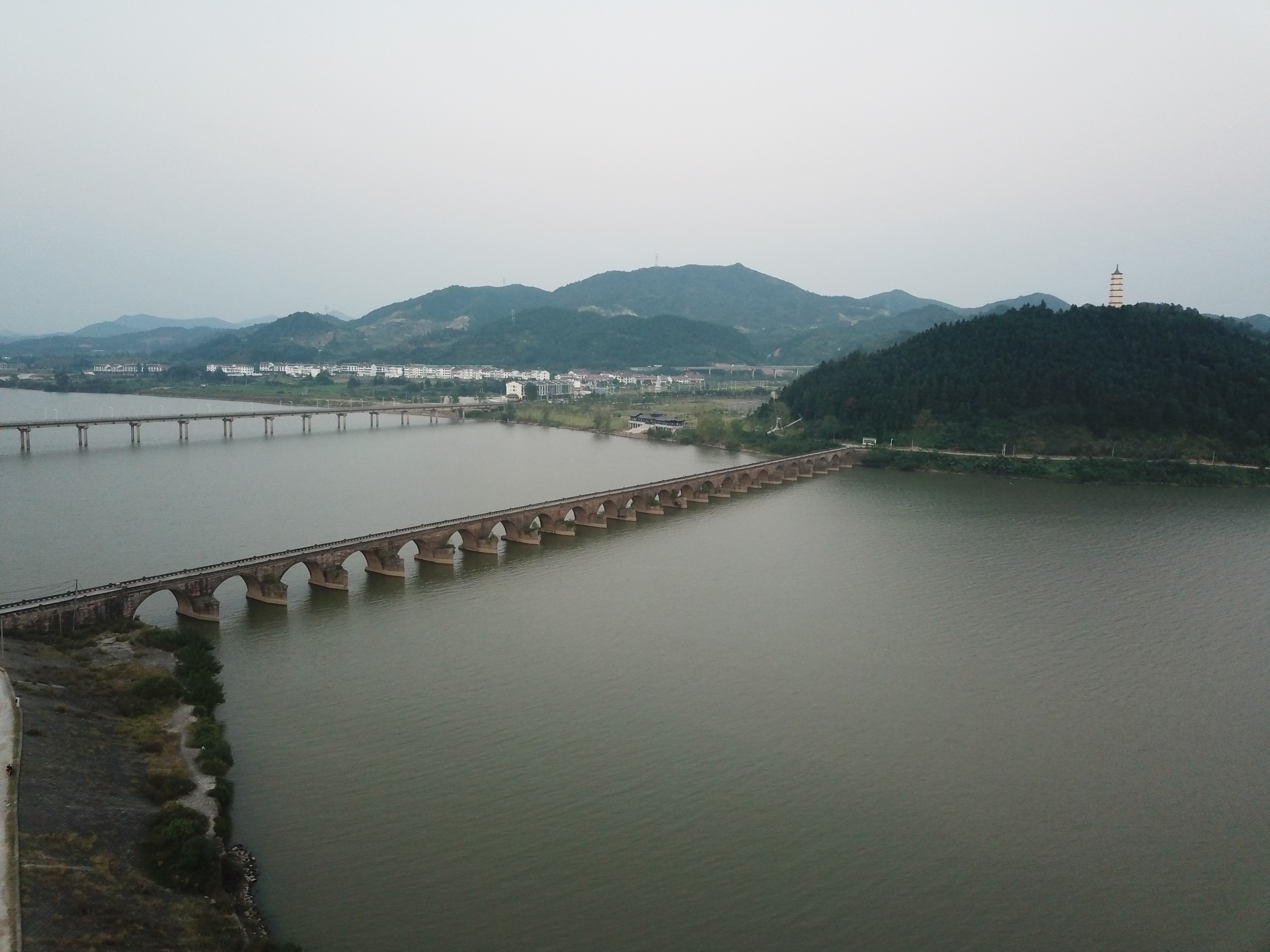
- Wannian Bridge in October 2018
- Coordinates: 27°35′13.56″N 116°39′16.8″E
- Crosses: Xu River
- Locale: Nancheng County, Jiangxi, China

Characteristics
- Design: Arch Bridge
- Material: Stone
- Total length: 411 metres (1,348 ft)
- Width: 6.3 metres (21 ft)
- Height: 10 metres (33 ft)
- Longest span: 14 metres (46 ft)

History
- Construction start: 1635
- Construction end: 1647
- Opened: 1647

Location
- Interactive map of Wannian Bridge

The Wannian Bridge (simplified Chinese: 万年桥; traditional Chinese: 萬年橋; pinyin: Wànnián Qiáo) is a stone arch bridge built over the Xu River in 1647 at the dawn of the Qing dynasty (1644–1911). It is located in Nancheng County, Jiangxi, China. It is adjacent to the Juxing Pagoda.

== History ==
Construction of the Wannian Bridge, commenced in 1635 and was completed in 1647, which took 12 years. During the Qing dynasty (1644–1911), it underwent three renovations, respectively in the ruling of Yongzheng Emperor (1724) and in the reign of Qianlong Emperor and in 1887 in the 13th year of Guangxu era.

In March 2013, it was listed among the seventh batch of "Major National Historical and Cultural Sites in Jiangxi" by the State Council of China.

== Architecture ==
The bridge is 411-metre (1,348 ft) in length, 10-metre (33 ft) in height, 6.3-metre (21 ft) in width and 14-metre (46 ft) in span. It has 23 holes and 24 piers.
