= Qinghua Rainbow Bridge =

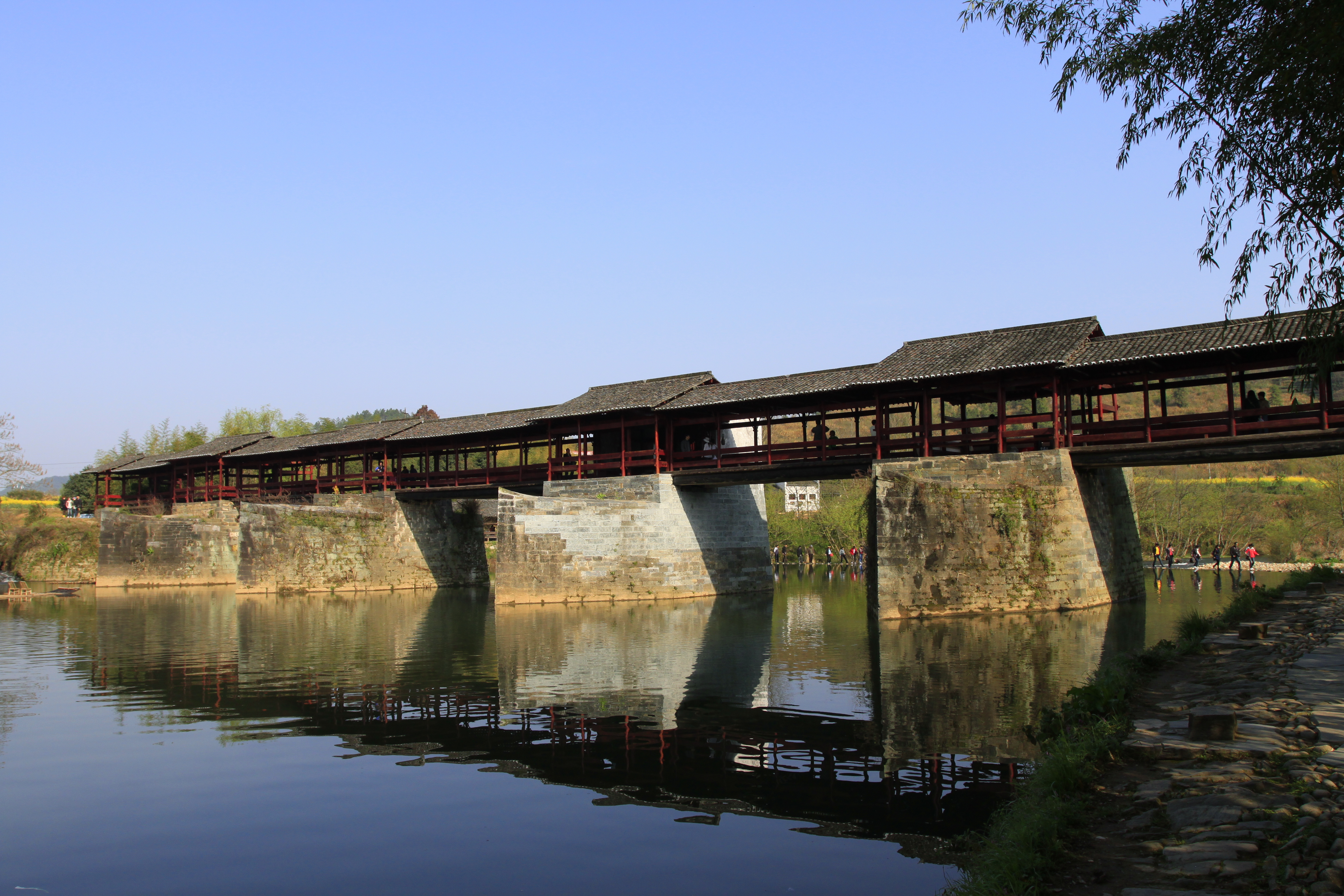
- Qinghua Rainbow Bridge in April 2012.
- Coordinates: 29°25′02″N 117°46′11″E
- Crossed: Le'an River
- Locale: Wuyuan County, Jiangxi, China

Characteristics
- Design: Beam bridge Stone bridge
- Total length: 140 m (459 ft)
- Width: 3.1 m (10 ft)
- No. of spans: 4

History
- Construction end: Qianlong period (1736–1796; reconstruction)
- Collapsed: July 9, 2020

Qinghua Rainbow Bridge (simplified Chinese: 清华彩虹桥; traditional Chinese: 清華彩虹橋; pinyin: Qínghuá Cáihóng Qiáo) was a large stone beam bridge in the town of Qinghua, Wuyuan County, Jiangxi, China. The bridge went across the Le'an River. The bridge was 140 m (459 ft) long and 3.1 m (10 ft) wide, with 4 piers and 5 bridge openings.

== Etymology ==
The name of "Rainbow" derives from Tang dynasty (618–907) Chinese poet Li Bai's poem Climbing Xuancheng Xie Tiao North Tower in Autumn (秋登宣城谢眺北楼).

== History ==
According to The Records of Wuyuan Scenery (婺源风物录), Qinghua Rainbow Bridge was built in the Song dynasty (960–1279), but according to Genealogy of Hu Family in Qinghua (清华胡氏仁德堂世谱) and Wuyuan County Annals (婺源县志), it was built in Qianlong period (1736–1796) of the Qing dynasty (1644–1911).

On April 25, 2006, it was listed among the sixth group of "Major National Historical and Cultural Sites in Jiangxi" by the State Council of China.

On the afternoon of July 8, 2020, Qinghua Rainbow Bridge was devastated by flood.

== Gallery ==
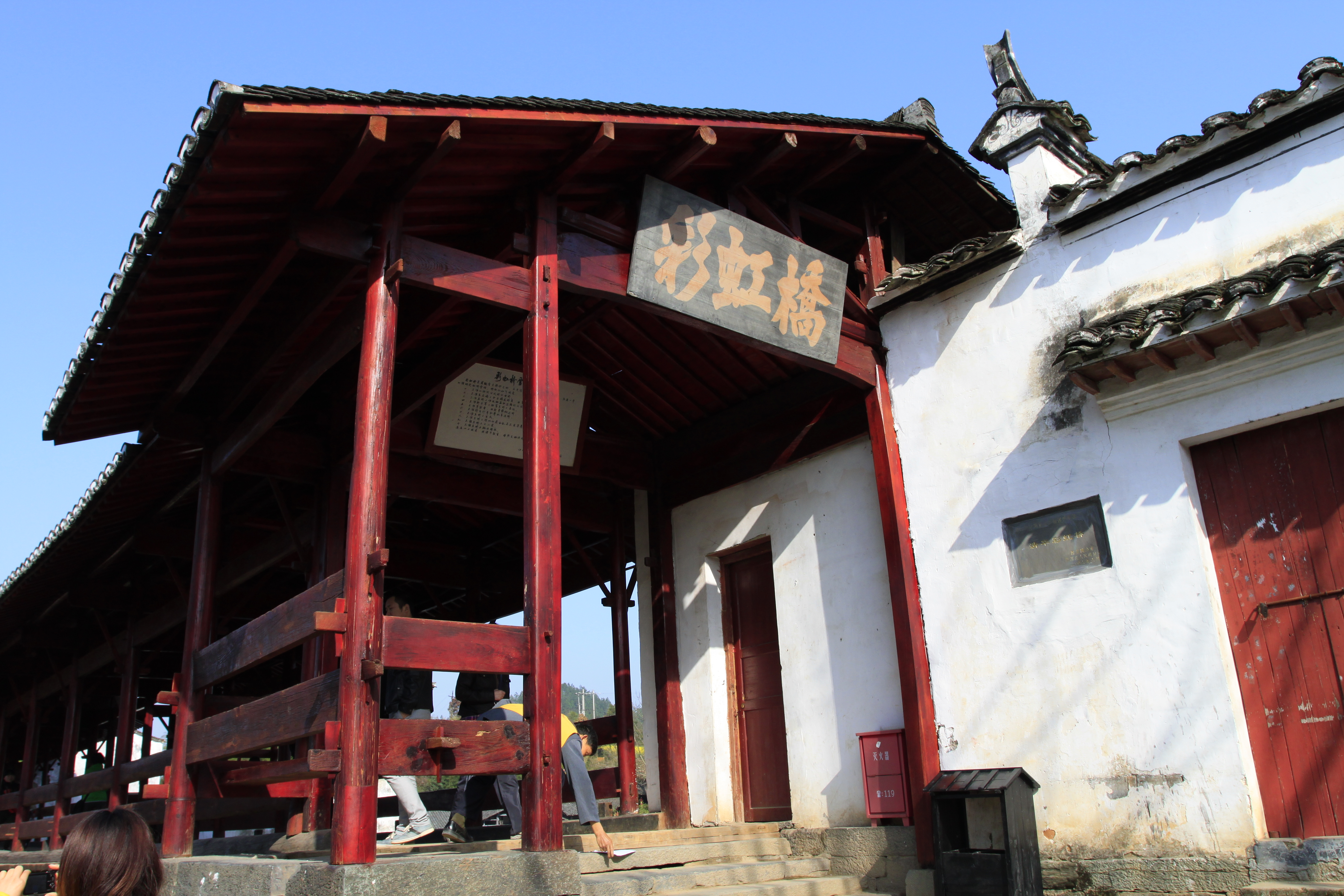
Eastern section.

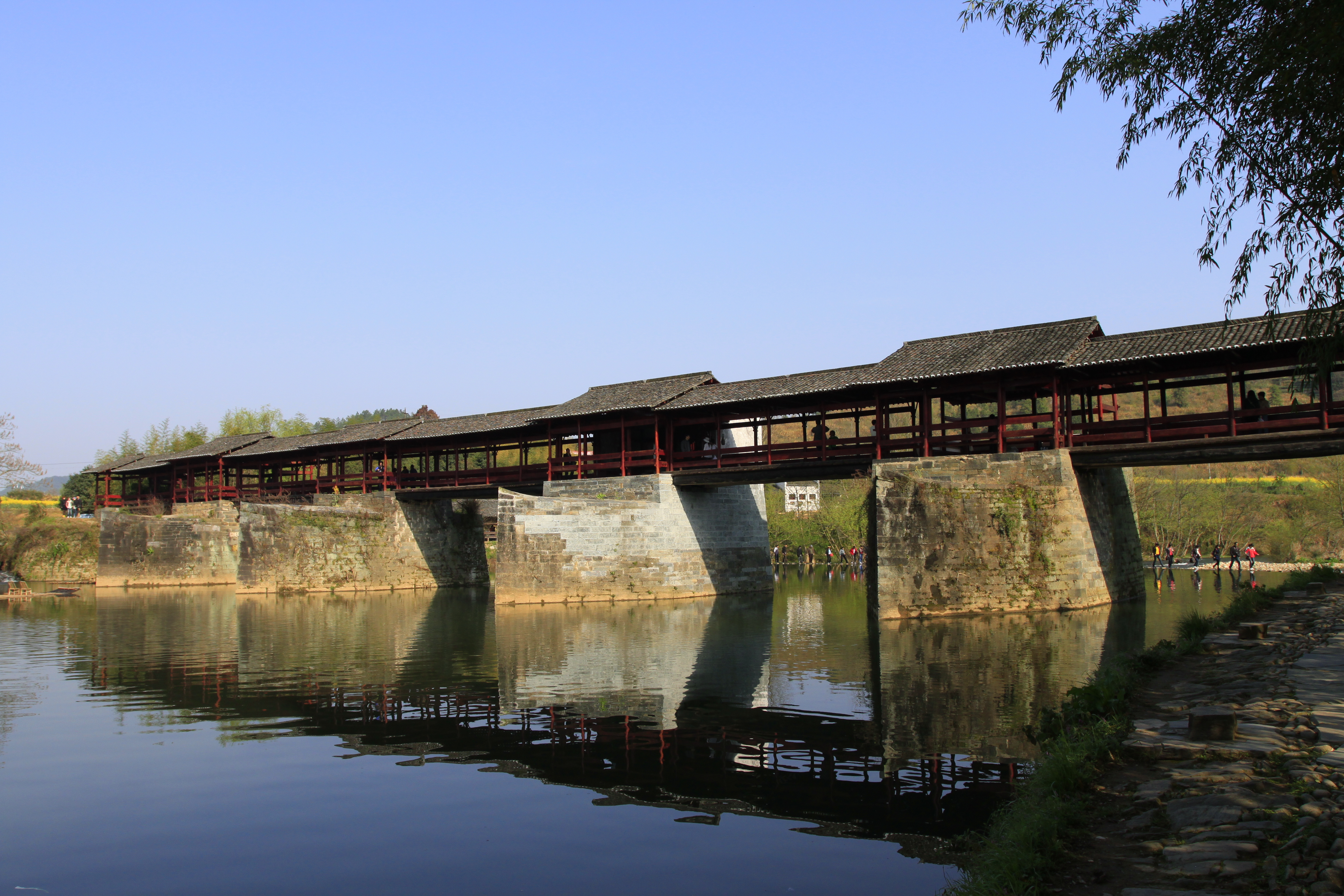

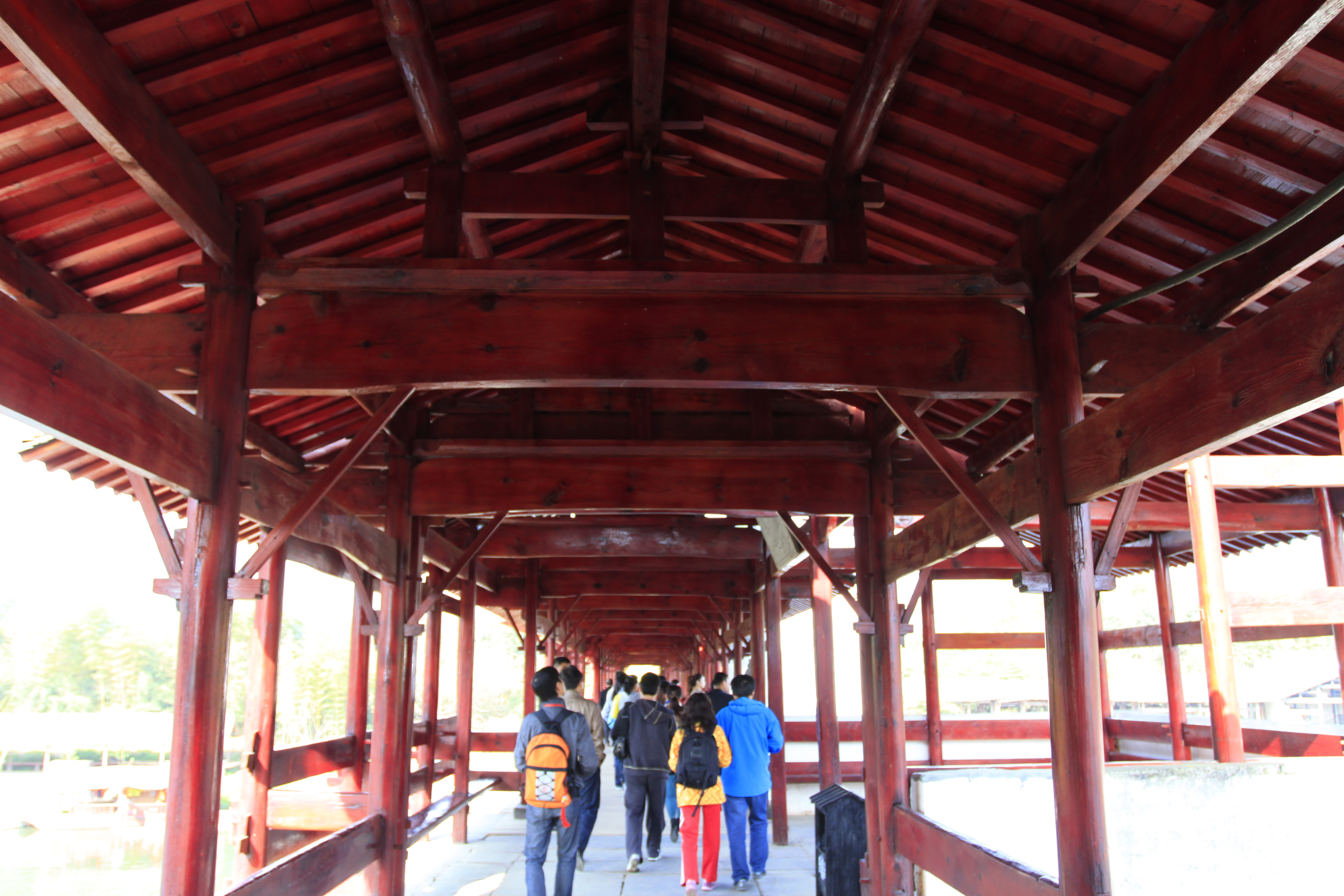
Beam frame.

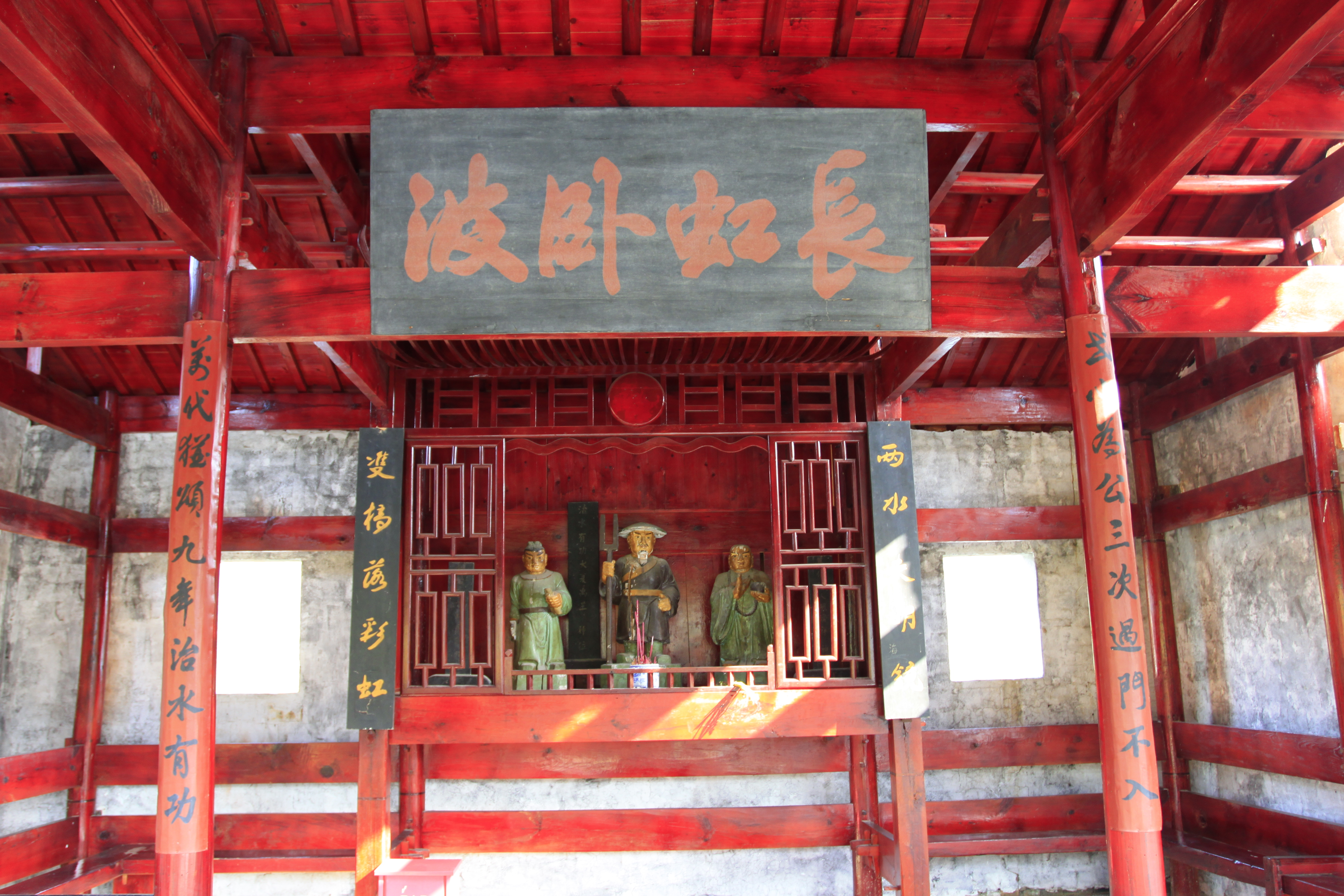
Shrine.

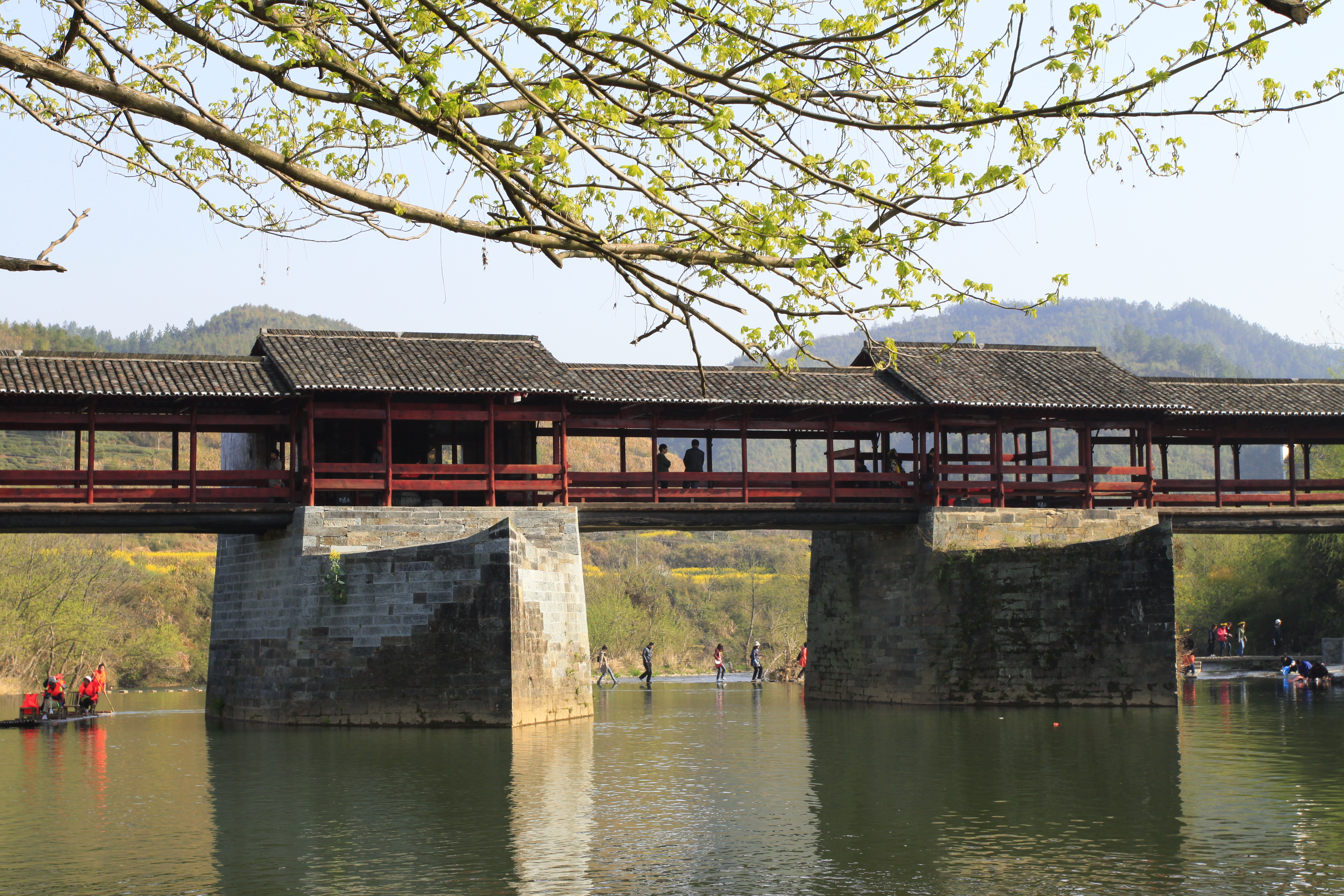

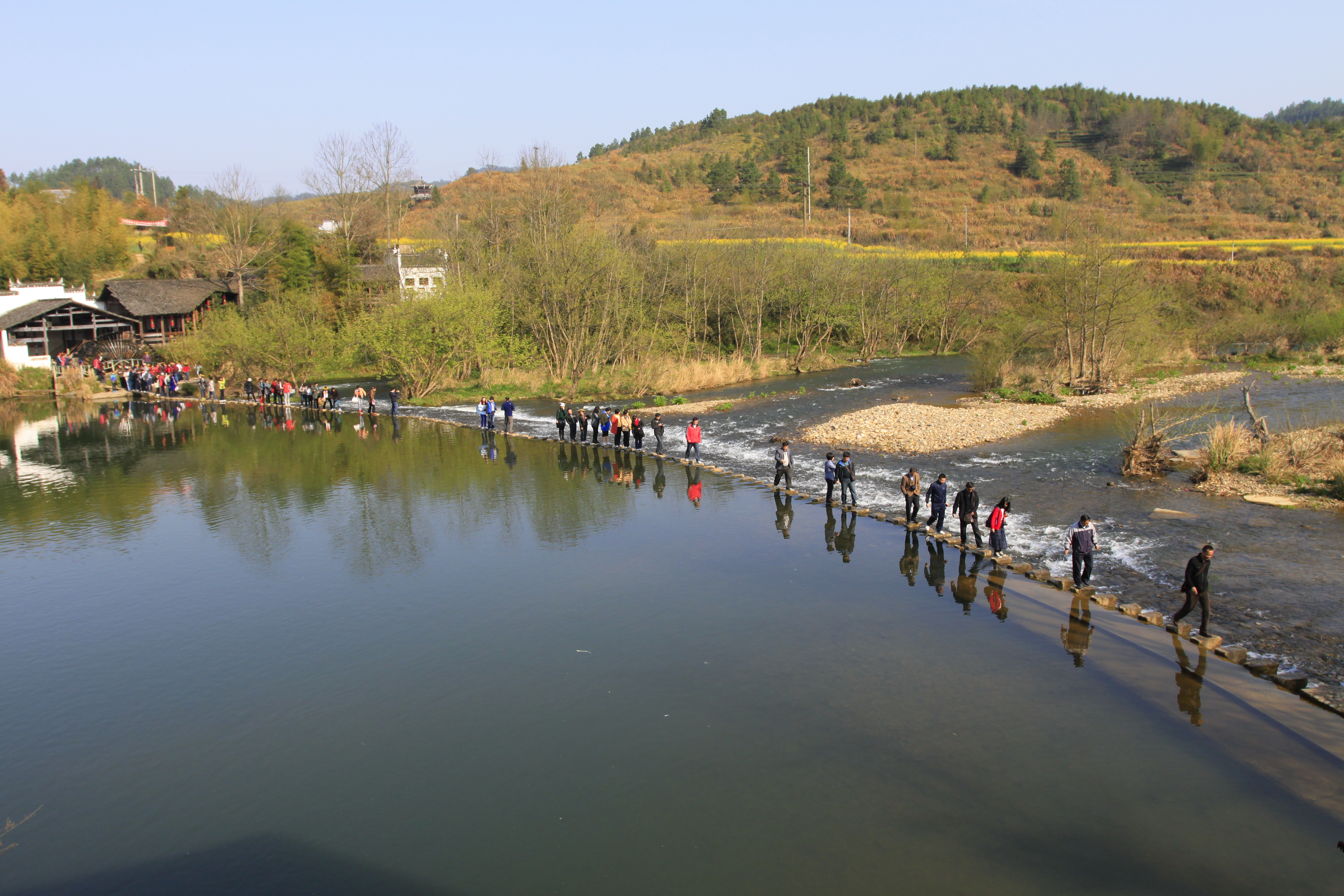
Stepping stones on water.
