= Juxing Pagoda =

- 聚星塔
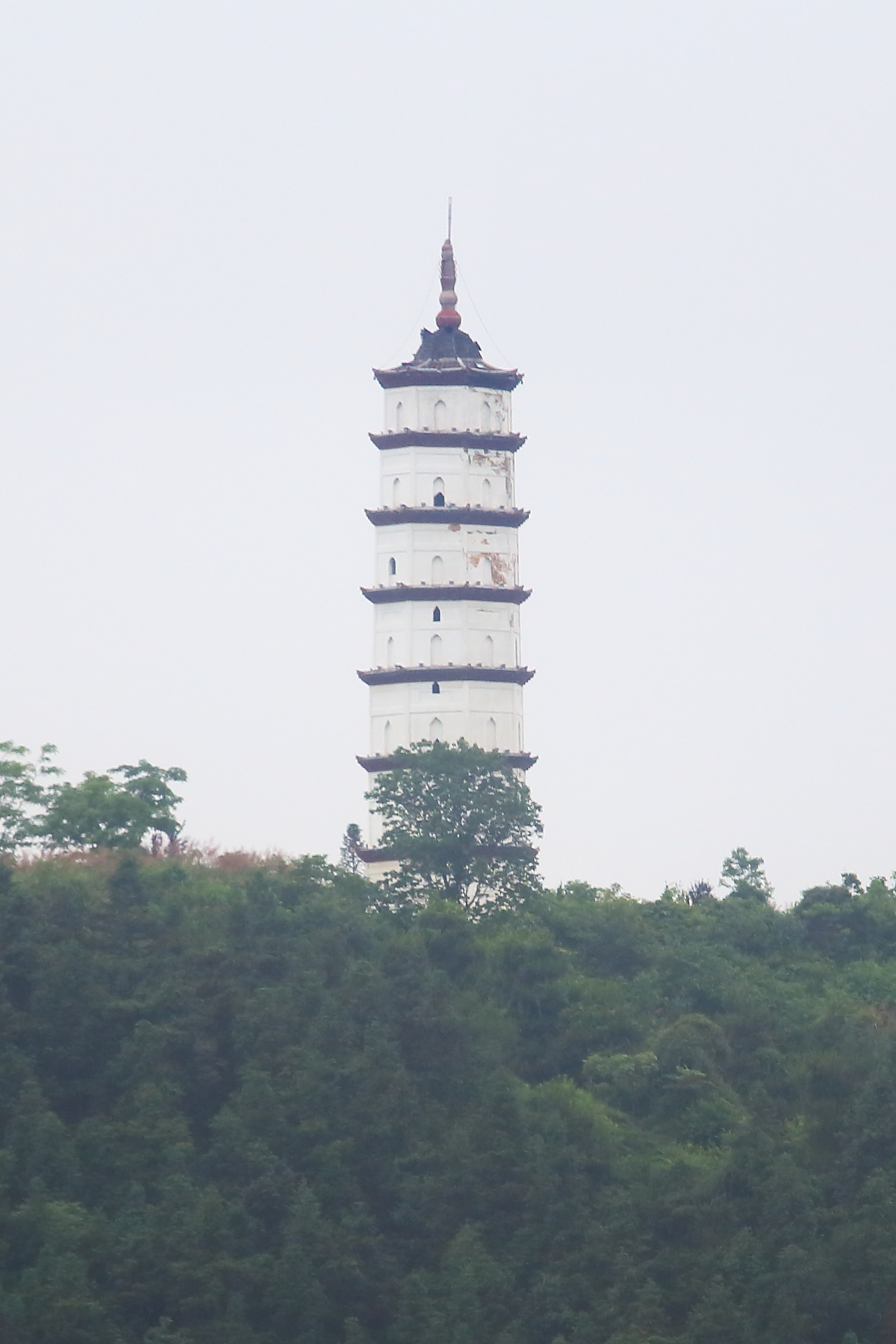
- Juxing Pagoda in May 2014.
- Interactive map of the Juxing Pagoda area

General information
- Type: Pagoda
- Architectural style: Chinese architecture
- Location: Nancheng County, Jiangxi, China
- Coordinates: 27°35′11″N 116°39′29″E
- Groundbreaking: 1614
- Completed: 1614
- Opened: 1614
- Renovated: 1638; 1754

Height
- Height: 30 metres (98 ft)

Technical details
- Material: Bricks

The Juxing Pagoda (Chinese: 聚星塔; pinyin: Jùxīng Tǎ) is a Chinese pagoda located in Nancheng County, Jiangxi, China. It lies on the top of Mount Wugang (武岗山) and on the east bank of Xu River. In 2013 it has been listed as among the seventh group of "Major National Historical and Cultural Sites in Jiangxi" by the State Council of China.

== History ==
=== Ming dynasty ===
According to Nanchang County Annals (南城县志), the pagoda was built as Qiming (启明) by magistrate Hu Mingzuo (胡明佐) in 1614 during the reign of Wanli Emperor in the late Ming dynasty (1368–1644). "Qiming" means to hope for the prosperity and prosperity of the Ming Empire. In 1638, the pagoda was slightly damaged by lightning.

=== Qing dynasty ===
In 1645, in the 2nd year of Shunzhi period of the Qing dynasty (1644–1911), a disastrous fire consumed the pagoda. In 1662, in the period of the Kangxi Emperor, magistrate Gao Tianjue (高天爵) renovated and refurbished it. Due to the social taboo of "Ming" (Ming or Daming means the former Ming dynasty), its name was changed to "Shuangjiang" (双江; 'Two Rivers'). In 1754, during the Qianlong era, magistrate Yao Wenguang (姚文光) supervised the restoration and renamed it "Juxing" (聚星).

=== Modern China ===
In December 1987, it has been designated as a provincial level cultural heritage by the Jiangxi Provincial Government.

The pagoda became dilapidated for neglect. In 1992, the restoration project was launched and was completed in October of the following year.

In 2013, it inscribed to the seventh batch of "List of Major National Historical and Cultural Sites in Jiangxi" by the State Council of China.

== Architecture ==
The 30-metre (98 ft) pagoda was octagonal with seven stories. It is made of bricks.
