= Guanyin Bridge =

Guanyin Bridge 观音桥
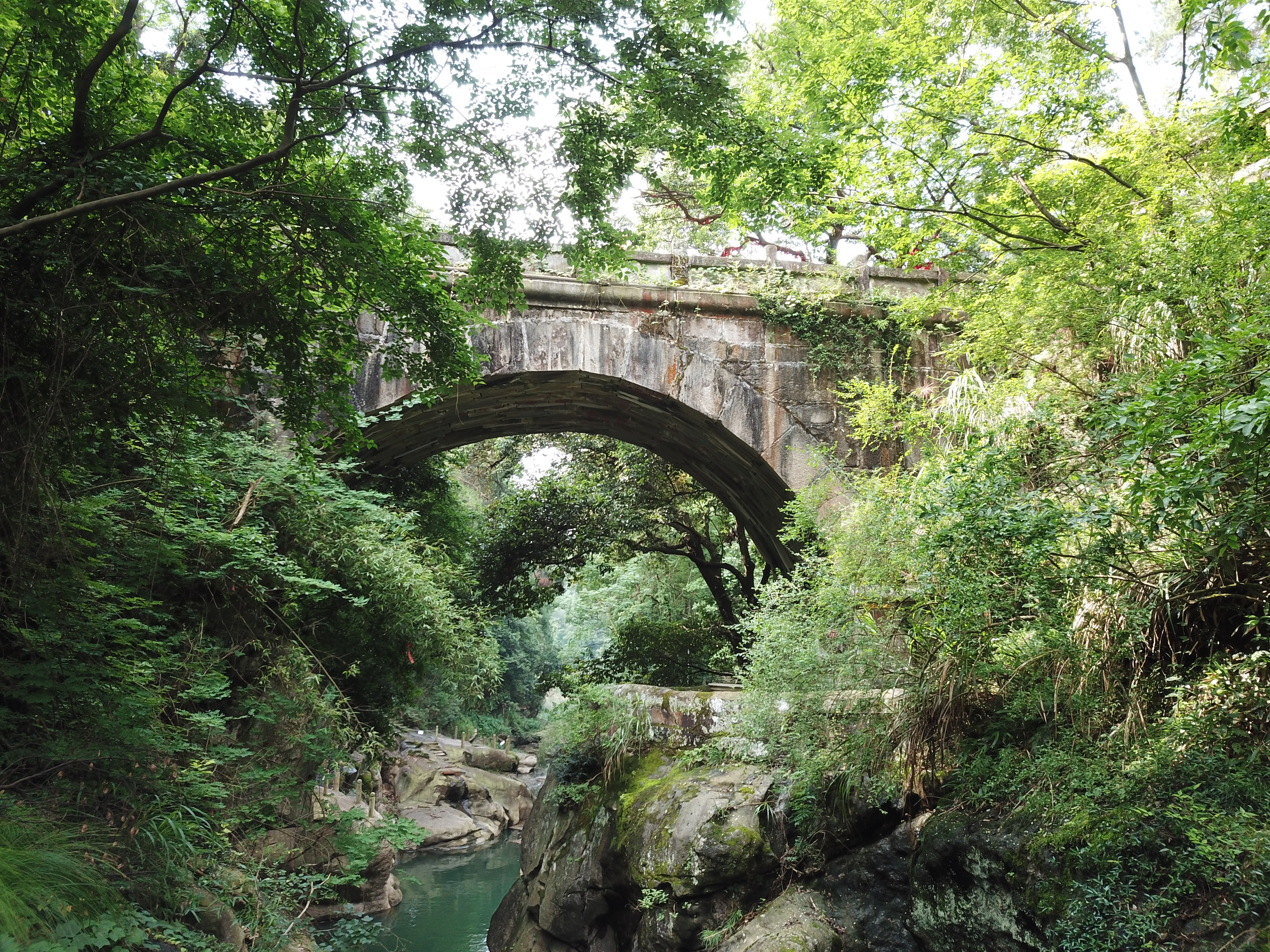
- Guanyin Bridge in June 2018.
- Coordinates: 29°31′11″N 116°00′20″E
- Crosses: Sanxia Stream (三峡涧)
- Locale: Lushan, Jiangxi, China

Characteristics
- Design: Arch Bridge
- Material: Stone
- Total length: 24.45 metres (80.2 ft)
- Width: 4.94 metres (16.2 ft)
- Height: 10.7 metres (35 ft)
- Longest span: 10.33 metres (33.9 ft)

History
- Construction start: 1014
- Construction end: 1014
- Opened: 1014

The Guanyin Bridge (simplified Chinese: 观音桥; traditional Chinese: 觀音橋; pinyin: Guānyīn Qiáo) is a stone arch bridge located on the southern Mount Lu, in Lushan, Jiangxi, China. It was built in 1014 during the reign of Emperor Zhenzong of the Song dynasty (960–1279). It is one of the earliest existing stone arch bridges in China.

== History ==
The bridge was built as "Qianxian Bridge" (栖贤桥) in 1014, during the Song dynasty (960–1279). In history, Su Shi, Su Zhe, Huang Tingjian, Yang Wanli, Wang Shipeng, Zhu Xi, Wen Tianxiang, Ouyang Xuan, and Tang Yin wrote poems and articles singing about the bridge. In the Qing dynasty (1644–1911), a Buddhist temple named "Cihang Temple" (慈航寺) was built in front of the bridge. "Cihang" means "Guanyin". Therefore, the bridge was called "Guanyin Bridge".

Guanyin Bridge was inscribed as a provincial cultural relics protection unit in 1959 and was listed among the "Major National Historical and Cultural Sites in Jiangxi" by the State Council of China.

== Architecture ==
The bridge is 24.45-metre (80.2 ft) in length, 10.7-metre (35 ft) in height, 4.94-metre (16.2 ft) in width and 10.33-metre (33.9 ft) in span. It was made of 107 pieces of granite. The construction time of the bridge is engraved on the deck.
