= List of Major National Historical and Cultural Sites in Jiangxi =

This list is of Major Sites Protected for their Historical and Cultural Value at the National Level in the Province of Jiangxi, People's Republic of China.

Site	Chinese name	Location	Designation	Image
Site of the Headquarters of the Nanchang Uprising	"Ba-Yi" qiyi zhihuibu jiuzhi "八一"起义指挥部旧址	Nanchang 南昌市	1-13	Upload file
Revolutionary base in the Jinggang Mountains	Jinggang shan geming yizhi 井冈山革命遗址	26°36′13″N 114°11′45″E Jinggangshan 井冈山市	1-17	Upload file
Revolutionary base in Ruijin	Ruijin geming yizhi 瑞金革命遗址	Ruijin 瑞金市	1-20	Upload file
Site of the Railwayman and Miners Club, Anyuan	Anyuan lukuang gongren julebu jiuzhi 安源路矿工人俱乐部旧址	Pingxiang 萍乡市	2-4	Upload file
Hutian Kiln	Hutian gu ciyao zhi 湖田古瓷窑址	Jingdezhen	2-53	Upload file
Site of the Headquarters of the Ningdu Uprising	Ningdu qiyi zhikunbu jiuzhi 宁都起义指挥部旧址	Ningdu County 宁都县	3-31	Upload file
Tongtianyan Grottoes	Tongtianyan shiku 通天岩石窟	Ganzhou 赣州市	3-52	Upload file
Guanyin Bridge	Guanyin qiao 观音桥	Xingzi County 星子县	3-67	Upload file
White Deer Grotto Academy	Bailu shuyuan 白鹿书院	29°40′18″N 115°59′21″E Xingzi County 星子县	3-74	Upload file
Town Houses in Xiangjilong	Xiangjilong minzhai 祥集弄民宅	Jingdezhen 景德镇市	3-90	Upload file
Shangrao Concentration Camp	Shangrao jizhongying jiuzhi 上饶集中营旧址	Shangrao	3-162	Upload file
Wucheng Site	Wucheng yizhi 吴城遗址	Zhangshu 樟树市	4-25	Upload file
Site of the Hongzhou Porcelain Kilns	Hongzhou yao yizhi 洪州窑遗址	Fengcheng 丰城市	4-42	Upload file
Ganzhou City Walls	Ganzhou chengqiang 赣州城墙	Ganzhou 赣州市	4-105	Upload file
Site of the Lushan Conference and Villas of Lushan	Lushan huiyi jiuzhi ji Lushan bieshu zhujian qun 庐山会议旧址及庐山别墅建筑群	Jiujiang 九江市	4-219	Upload file
Former Site of the Hunan-Jiangxi Provincial Party Committee Office	Xiang-Gan sheng-wei jiguan jiuzhi 湘赣省委机关旧址	Yongxin County 永新县	4-234	Upload file
Former Site of the Fujian-Zhejiang-Jiangxi Provincial Party Committee Office	Min-Zhe-Gan sheng-wei jiguan jiuzhi 闽浙赣省委机关旧址	Zhangshu 横峰县	4-235	Upload file
Xianren Cave and Diaotonghuan	Xianrendong, Diaotonghuan yizhi 仙人洞、吊桶环遗址	Wannian County	5-54	Upload file
Zhuweicheng Site	Zhuweicheng yizhi 筑卫城遗址	Zhangshu 樟树市	5-55	Upload file
Site of the Tongling Copper Mine	Tongling tongkuang yizhi 铜岭铜矿遗址	Ruichang 瑞昌市	5-56	Upload file
Jizhou Kiln Site	Jizhou yao yizhi 吉州窑遗址	Ji'an County 吉安县	5-57	Upload file
Rock Tombs of Xianshui Yan	Xianshui Yan yamuqun 仙水岩崖墓群	Guixi 贵溪市	5-167	Upload file
Traditional Architecture of Liukengcun	Liukengcun gu jianzhuqun 流坑村古建筑群	Le'an County 乐安县	5-334	Upload file
Guanxi Xinwei and Yanyi Wei	Guanxi Xinwei, Yanyi wei 关西新围、燕翼围	Longnan County 龙南县	5-335	Upload file
Fanchengdui Site	Fanchengdui yizhi 樊城堆遗址	Zhangshu 樟树市	6-99	Upload file
Niutoucheng Site	Niutouchengzhi 牛头城址	Xingan County 新干县	6-100	Upload file
Baikou City Site	Baikou chengzhi 白口城址	Taihe County 泰和县	6-101	Upload file
Lidu Brewery Site	Lidu shaojiu zuofang yizhi 李渡烧酒作坊遗址	Jinxian County 进贤县	6-102	Upload file
Yuyaochang Kiln Site	Yuyaochang yao zhi 御窑厂窑址	Jingdezhen 景德镇市	6-103	Upload file
Grave of Zhu Shi	Zhu Shi mu 朱轼墓	Gao'an 高安市	6-255	Upload file
Zhenru Temple Pagoda Forest	Zhenru si talin 真如寺塔林	Yongxiu County 永修县	6-601	Upload file
Dabao Guangta Pagoda	Dabao guangta 大宝光塔	Gan County 赣县	6-602	Upload file
Ganzhou Pagodas (including 5 pagodas)	Ganzhou Fota 赣州佛塔	Ganzhou 赣州市	6-603	Upload file
Mingshui Bridge	Mingshui qiao 鸣水桥	Zhangshu 樟树市	6-604	Upload file
Qinghua Rainbow Bridge	Qinghua caihong qiao 清华彩虹桥	Wuyuan County 婺源县	6-605	Upload file
Yuanzhou Drum Tower	Yuanzhou qiaolou 袁州谯楼	Yichun 宜春市	6-606	Upload file
Ehu Academy	Ehu shuyuan 鹅湖书院	Yanshan County 铅山县	6-607	Upload file
Ancestral Temples of Wuyuan (7 sites)	Wuyuan zongci 婺源宗祠	Wuyuan County 婺源县	6-608	Upload file
Houses of Likengcun	Likeng cun minju 理坑村民居	Wuyuan County 婺源县	6-609	Upload file
Mei Pass and Old Post Road	Meiguan he gu yidao 梅关和古驿道	Dayu County 大余县	6-610	Upload file
Chen Family Paifang	Chenshi paifang 陈氏牌坊	Jinxian County 进贤县	6-611	Upload file
Qingyunpu	Qingyunpu 青云谱	Nanchang 南昌市	6-612	Upload file
Xiufeng Rock Inscriptions	Xiufeng moya 秀峰摩崖	Xingzi County 星子县	6-829	Upload file
Longgang Tombstones	Longgang qianbiao bei 泷冈阡表碑	Yongfeng County 永丰县	6-830	Upload file
Peng Clan Stone Carvings in Dazhi	Dazhi Peng shi jiazu shike 大智彭氏家族石刻	Anfu County 安福县	6-831	Upload file
Former Site of the Standard Oil Company	Meifu yanghang jiuzhi 美孚洋行旧址	Jiujiang 九江市	6-970	Upload file
Revolutionary Sites of Xingguo (including 5 sites)	Xingguo geming jiuzhi 兴国革命旧址	Xingguo County 兴国县	6-971	Upload file
Former Site of the Luofang Conference and Xingguo Investigations	Luofang huiyi he Xingguo diaochahui jiuzhi 罗坊会议和兴国调查会旧址	Xinyu 新余市	6-972	Upload file
Former Hubei-Hunan-Jiangxi Revolutionary Bases	Xiang E Gan geming genjudi jiuzhi 湘鄂赣革命根据地旧址	Wanzai County 万载县	6-973	Upload file
Site of the Starting Point of the Central Red Army on the Long March	Zhongyang hongjun changzheng chufadi jiuzhi 中央红军长征出发地旧址	Yudu 于都县	6-974	Upload file
Former Headquarters of the New Fourth Army	Nanchang xinsijun junbu jiuzhi 南昌新四军军部旧址	Nanchang 南昌市	6-975	Upload file

== See also ==
- Principles for the Conservation of Heritage Sites in China
